= List of monuments in Kurta Municipality =

List of monuments in territory of Georgia (Country)

The monuments in the Kurta Municipality is a group of cultural heritage sites registered by the government of Georgia on the territory of the de jure Kurta Municipality, which has been under the control of South Ossetia, an entity with limited international recognition, since the 2008 Russo-Georgian War. Due to the continued presence of the Russian troops, Georgia, in accordance to its Law on Occupied territories (Article 7.4), holds Russia responsible for the protection of cultural heritage in the area.

The table lists a monument, its location and dating as well as the status attached to it by the Georgian authorities and the number assigned in the registry by the National Agency for Cultural Heritage Preservation of Georgia, which is available online as a GIS portal. The Agency broadly classifies the heritage sites into three groups: 1) the objects without a status, 2) immovable monuments of cultural heritage, and 3) immovable monuments of national significance.

Object	National Registry number	Date of construction	Location	Status	Image
Abotsminda church		Middle Ages	Zemo Achabeti		
Andzisi church		Middle Ages	Andzisi		
Achabeti castle	1931	16th century	Zemo Achabeti	Cultural Monument of National Significance	
Bortsvisjvari church	1952	Middle Ages	Tbeti	Cultural Monument	
Church of the Virgin Mary in Galuanta			Galuanta		
Church of the Virgin Mary in Gujabauri		Middle Ages	Gujabauri		
Tiri Monastery	1961	13th century	Monasteri	Cultural Monument of National Significance	
Ruins of church of St. Mariam in Zalda			Zalda		
Church of the Virgin Mary in Zalda		1820	Zalda		
Church of St. George in Zalda	1929	Middle Ages	Zalda	Cultural Monument	
Ruins of church of St. George in Zalda			Zalda		
Zakarwminda Church	6114	Middle Ages	Sveri	Cultural Monument	
Church of St. Estate in Zemo achabeti	6014	7th-9th centuries	Zemo achabeti	Cultural Monument	
Church of St. Kvirike in Zemo achabeti	6106	Middle Ages	Zemo achabeti	Cultural Monument	
Tamarasheni Grigoltsminda church	6141	Middle Ages	Tamarasheni	Cultural Monument	
church of the Savior in Tamarsheni		Middle Ages	Tamarasheni		
Kexvi Cylindrical tower	6106	Middle Ages	Kexvi	Cultural Monument	
Kexvi cult building "tsina dedaghvtisa"	1939	Developed feudal era	Kexvi	Cultural Monument	
Church of st. George in Kexvi		Middle Ages	Kexvi		
Church of st. George in Kexvi (early Middle Ages)		Early Middle Ages	Kexvi		
Church of the Archangel in Rustavi		Middle Ages	Rustavi		
Church of St. George in Dzartsemi	1965	Middle Ages	Dzartsemi	Cultural Monument	
Tbeti tower	1951	Middle Ages	Tbeti	Cultural Monument	
Kemerti church		Middle Ages	Kemerti		
Kemerti tower		18th century	Kemerti		
Kemerti Mindiaant tower		Middle Ages	Kemerti		
Kemerti Otiaant district tower		Middle Ages	Kemerti		
Church of St. George in Kemerti		9th-10th centuries	Kemerti		
Church of the St. Nicholas in Kvemo achabeti	6111	Middle Ages	Kvemo achabeti	Cultural Monument	
Church of St. George of the Trinity in Kurta		19th century	Kurta		
Niche of Michelangelo in Ghrubela			Ghrubela		
Dzartsemi walls		Middle Ages	Dzartsemi		
Church of St. George in Dzartsemi	1966	10th-12th centuries	Dzarwemi	Cultural Monument	
Chalisubani church		7th-9th centuries	Chalisubani		
Khetagaant tower		Middle Ages	Sveri		
Kheiti tower		Middle Ages	Kheiti		
Tower near Liakhvi in Kheiti		17th-18th centuries	Kheiti		
Church of the Savior in kheiti		17th-18th centuries	Kheiti		
Church of St. Saba in Kheiti	6137	10th century	Kheiti	Cultural Monument of National Significance	
Church of the Virgin Mary in Kheiti		Middle Ages	Kheiti		
Church of the Assumption in Kheiti		7th-9th centuries	Kheiti		
Church of the Cross in Kheiti		Middle Ages	Kheiti		
Khuciuri church		Middle Ages	Zemo achabeti		

== See also ==
- List of Cultural Heritage Monuments of Georgia
