= Tourism in South Ossetia =

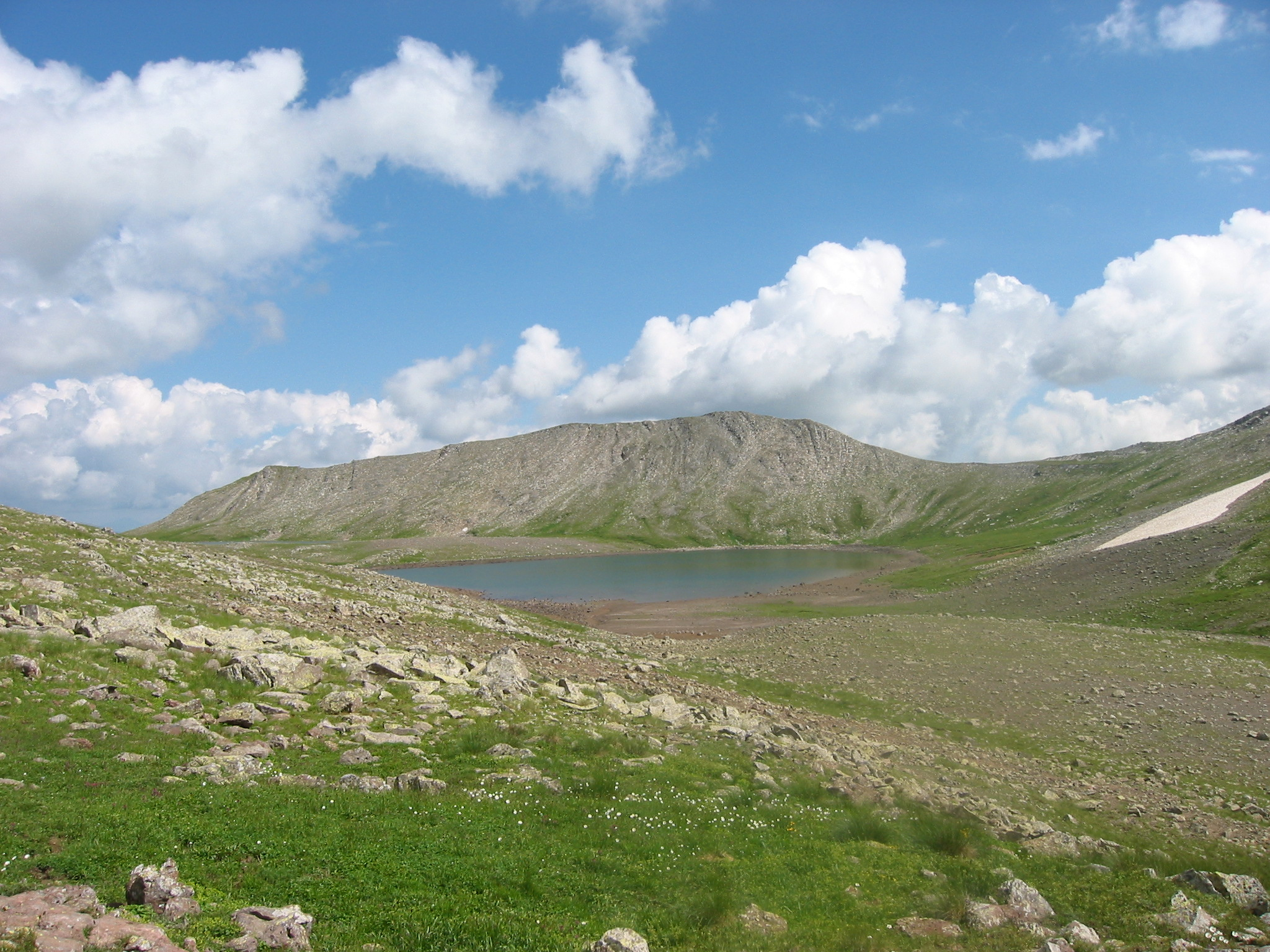
Keli Lake, in the Keli Highland plateau, a popular tourist attraction

Tourism in the breakaway state of the Republic of South Ossetia – the State of Alania, widely recognised internationally as being part of Georgia, is rare. It is illegal to enter South Ossetia under Georgian law. However, South Ossetia remains accessible through Russia via the South Ossetia–Russia border. Non-Russian citizens are required to hold a valid Russian visa that permits them to return to Russia, unless they are citizens of countries that are exempt from Russian visa requirements. Visitors, unless they hold a South Ossetian passport or are from an exempt country, such as Russia, are required to receive approval from the South Ossetian government in advance of their visit.

== Visas ==
South Ossetia does not issue visas, with visitors being required to receive approval from the South Ossetian government in advance of their visit. However, as South Ossetia is only accessible through Russia, non-Russian citizens are required to hold a valid Russian visa that permits them to return to Russia, unless they are citizens of countries that are exempt from Russian visa requirements.

== Tourist attractions and tours ==
South Ossetia, located in the South Caucasus, occupies part of the southern Caucasus Mountains, including the Keli Highland, which is a popular natural attraction among tourists to the state. Religious tourism is also popular, with South Ossetia having many old Christian churches, some dating back to the 9th century—the Bieti Monastery, Eredvi basilica, Tigva Monastery, Tiri Monastery and Tsirkoli church of the Mother of God are inscribed on the list of Georgia's Immovable Cultural Monuments of National Significance.

The tourism industry remains underdeveloped. However, several efforts to develop tourism have been made since 2010. During the COVID-19 pandemic, which saw the cancellation of international flights, the number of Russian tourists visiting South Ossetia domestically increased significantly. Between 2011 and 2020, Caucasus Explorer organised 28 tours in South Ossetia for Russians and other foreign tourists.

Tsirkoli church of the Mother of God

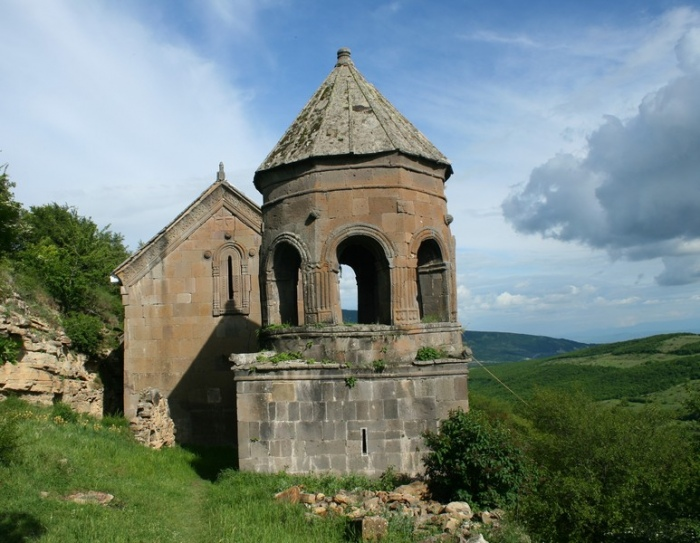
Tiri Monastery

== Travel advisories ==
As South Ossetia is widely recognised as being part of Georgia, several countries have issued warnings against travelling to the breakaway state. The Foreign, Commonwealth and Development Office of the United Kingdom advises against all travel to South Ossetia, due to the British government not recognising the state as independent and considering the region to be unstable. The United States' Bureau of Consular Affairs also advises against all travel, claiming "Attacks, criminal incidents, and kidnappings have occurred in and around the areas."

== See also ==
- Visa policy of South Ossetia
- Tourism in Georgia
- Tourism in Abkhazia
