= List of lakes of South Ossetia =

== A list of waters of the South Ossetia ==
Name	Region	Surface area (m².)	Max. length (m)	Surface elevation (m)	Coordinates	On Google Maps
Keli Lake	Akhalgori Municipality	1279600	2170	2925	42°28′47.90″N 44°18′54.28″E	look
Lake in Tskhinvali	Tskhinvali district	44800	370	850	42°12′53.50″N 43°58′29.25″E	look
Zonkarskoe Reservoir	Tskhinvali district	1000000	2650	1209	42°17′11.19″N 44°10′50.34″E	look
Lake north-west of Tskhinvali	Tskhinvali district	400	100	959	42°14′51.94″N 43°58′49.68″E	look
Tsunaristba	Znauri district	78400	440	895	42°11′51.98″N 43°53′40.81″E	look
Lake north of the v. Kvatetr	Znauri district	42500	290	848	42°9′2.57″N 43°49′58.36″E	look
Ertso Lake (Tba Ertso)	Dzau district	410000	940	1711	42°28′13.20″N 43°45′7.50″E	look
Kvedi	Dzau district	96800	650	1592	42°33′26.37″N 43°38′6.30″E	look
2	Dzau district	4200	90	2700	42°33′18.07″N 43°52′30.23″E	look
3	Dzau district	500	50	2580	42°31′23.96″N 43°51′34.01″E	look
4	Dzau district	600	50	2735	42°33′20.99″N 43°52′18.85″E	look
5	Dzau district	10800	370	3200	42°32′45.67″N 43°55′7.11″E	look
6	Dzau district	1200	60	3040	42°34′35.60″N 43°50′13.51″E	look
7	Dzau district	200	30	2502	42°30′31.82″N 43°49′1.63″E	look
8	Dzau district	100	20	2637	42°30′46.85″N 43°49′33.94″E	look
9	Dzau district	800	50	3177	42°33′4.02″N 43°54′56.26″E	look
10	Dzau district	700	90	3168	42°33′6.43″N 43°54′55.11″E	look
11	Dzau district	6450	170	3171	42°33′13.16″N 43°55′4.32″E	look
12	Dzau district	4800	230	3163	42°33′18.87″N 43°55′15.72″E	look
13	Dzau district	4000	110	2903	42°32′39.67″N 44°0′0.42″E	look
14	Dzau district	300	40	2424	42°30′24.99″N 43°49′8.59″E	look
15	Dzau district	200	20	2623	42°28′23.70″N 43°58′0.88″E	look

On the territory of South Ossetia is part of Keli Highland, which is the second by the number of lakes in the Caucasus.

== Notes ==
All data obtained by Google Earth.
