= Eredvi basilica =

- ერედვის ბაზილიკა
- Eredvi basilica of St. George
- Interactive map of Eredvi basilica
- Location: Eredvi, Eredvi Municipality, Shida Kartli, Georgia / Tskhinvali District, South Ossetia
- Coordinates: 42.248447°N 44.038632°E
- Type: Three-church basilica

The Eredvi basilica of Saint George (Georgian: ერედვის წმინდა გიორგის ბაზილიკა, romanized: eredvis ts'minda giorgis bazilik'a) is an early 10th-century Georgian Orthodox church in the village of Eredvi in the Shida Kartli region, currently in the disputed territory of South Ossetia. It was constructed by the architect Tevdore Taplaisdze, who laid foundation of the church in 906 as related in a Georgian inscription on the building. The church is a three-nave basilica, which, despite later reconstructions, has largely preserved its original architectural features. The church is inscribed on the list of the Immovable Cultural Monuments of National Significance of Georgia. After the 2008 Russo-Georgian War, the Georgians lost access to the church and services there were restricted by the South Ossetian authorities.

== Location and status ==
The Eredvi church of St. George is located in the village of Eredvi in the Little Liakhvi valley, 5 km northwest of the city of Tskhinvali. The village, whose recorded history goes back to the 14th century, was part of the South Ossetian Autonomous Oblast in Soviet Georgia, remained under the Georgian control after the 1991–1992 South Ossetia War, and was overran by the Russian and South Ossetian forces in the 2008 Russo-Georgian War. During the August 2008 hostilities, the curtain wall of the Eredvi church was partially damaged. According to the United States Department of State's International Religious Freedom Report for 2014, the South Ossetian authorities did not permit services in the Georgian Orthodox churches, such as Eredvi. In 2017, the largely ruined village Eredvi, deprived of its ethnic Georgian population, was completely demolished by the South Ossetian authorities with the Russian aid. The church was reported standing untouched by the Tskhinvali-based South Ossetian media and a local video blogger.

The church was placed on the list of the Immovable Cultural Monuments of National Significance of Georgia in 2007. It is protected as part of the Greater Liakhvi Valley Museum and Reserve, whose administration, after the 2008 war, is based in exile in the Verkhvebi neighborhood of Gori and is tasked with collecting information on cultural monuments in South Ossetia left beyond Georgia's control.

== History and architecture ==
The Eredvi basilica is enclosed within the complex of a ruined fortress, which consists of a rampart—irregular rectangle in shape—and two towers to its northwest. The towers, one of which in ruins and the other rising three storeys, are dated to the 13th–14th century; the rampart was reconstructed in the 18th. By the 18th century, both the fortress and the church were in possession of the Princes Pavlenishvili. The church was deemed to have been "miraculous" as reported by Prince Vakhushti of Kartli and was described by the 1826 French Dictionnaire géographique universel as the site of a yearly pilgrimage.

The basilica, which measures 13 × 21 metres, is built of hewn stone and is roofed with tiles. It is a modified three-nave design, peculiar for the early medieval Georgian architecture, and defined by the art historian Giorgi Chubinashvili as "three-church" basilicas. These are a series of churches, in which the nave is completely separated from the aisles with solid walls, in order to create what are almost three independent churches.

An ambulatory at Eredvi envelopes the church from all four sides, including the eastern façade, a feature unusual for the contemporaneous churches of this type, which usually had an ambulatory running on three sides. The main nave is divided by prominent pilasters into two nearly equal parts. The vault over the middle nave is supported by arches. The arch of a semicircular apse is two-tiered and somewhat horseshoe-shaped. The apse itself is lower than the central chamber. The entrance to the church is from south, and additionally, from the west. The window and doors are decorated with carved stone headpieces and crosses.

== Inscription ==
The Eredvi basilica contains an engraved inscription in the medieval Georgian asomtavruli script, placed in the upper part of a round column on the southern wall. It is made in the name of the architect Teodore Taplaisdze and dates laying the foundation of the church to 906. The text makes mention of contemporary lay and clerical dignitaries, such King Constantine III of Abkhazia, who had recently conquered the wider region of Kartli from its Bagratid rulers, Ivane Tbeli, member of the great noble family of Kartli, and Bishop Stephen of Nikozi, the church's patron. The inscription, further, relates Constantine's victorious campaign against Hereti and his reduction of the fortress of Vejini in that country.
