= Chorbauli =

Village in Georgia (country)

Chorbouli ჭორბაული
- Location within Georgia Location within Shida Kartli
- Coordinates: 42°10′14″N 43°52′36″E
- Country: Georgia
- Municipality: Tighva
- Elevation: 800 m (2,600 ft)
- Time zone: UTC+4 (Georgian Time)

Chorbouli (Georgian: ჭორბაული) was a village in Georgia, located in the Tighva municipality (part of the Avnevi community). Since the 2008 Russian invasion of Georgia, it has been governed as part of the breakaway Republic of South Ossetia, a state with limited international recognition.

Until 1991, it was part of the Znauri District. The village lies in the valley of the East Prone River, at an elevation of 800 meters above sea level. It is located 24 kilometers from Kornisi.
