= Bagata (village) =

Bagata Iron Ossetic: Багатæ Georgian: ბაგატა
- Village
- Location within South Ossetia Location within Shida Kartli Location within Georgia
- Coordinates: 42°12′31″N 43°53′35″E
- Country: Georgia
- De facto state: South Ossetia (Note: South Ossetia's status is disputed. It considers itself to be an independent state, but this is recognised by only a few other countries. The Georgian government and most of the world's other states consider South Ossetia de jure a part of Georgia's territory.)
- Time zone: UTC+4 (Georgian Time)

Bagata (Iron Ossetic: Багатæ, Georgian: ბაგატა) is a settlement in the Tskhinvali District/Gori Municipality of South Ossetia, Georgia. It is 7 kilometers from Tskhinvali.

== History ==
This Eastern Georgia village used to be in Khetagurovo Community, Kurta Municipality. In 1991 it was included in Tskhinvali District.

== Geography ==
Located on Shida Kartli plain. 900 meters above sea level.

== See also ==
- Tskhinvali District
