= Matchabelli =

Matchabelli or Matchabeli may refer to:

- Machabeli, a Georgian princely house of nobility
- Ivane Machabeli, a Georgian writer
- Georges V. Matchabelli, Georgian nobleman and co-founder of the perfume line
- Norina Matchabelli, Italian actress and co-founder of Prince Matchabelli perfume line, wife of Georges V. Matchabelli

== See also ==
- Prince Matchabelli, an American perfume line by Georges V. Matchabelli
