= Tiri Monastery =

13th-century Georgian church under illegal Russian occupation since 2008

- თირის მონასტერი
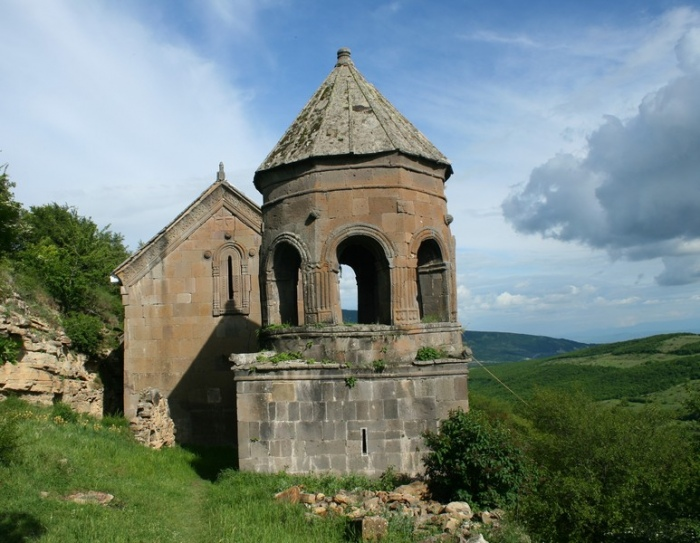
- Tiri Monastery as of 2013
- Interactive map of Tiri Monastery
- Location: Monasteri, Kurta Municipality, Shida Kartli, Georgia / Tskhinvali District, South Ossetia
- Coordinates: 42.281908°N 43.928965°E
- Type: Hall church

The Tiri monastery (Georgian: თირის მონასტერი, romanized: tiris monast'eri) is a 13th-century church near Tskhinvali in what is now the disputed territory of South Ossetia. Built as a Georgian Orthodox monastery in a hall church plan, it bears medieval frescoes and Georgian inscriptions. After the 2008 Russo-Georgian War, the Georgians lost access to the monastery. In 2015, the church building was subjected to maintenance works which infringed on authenticity and partially damaged the frescoes, leading to a controversy in Tskhinvali and protests from Georgia. The monastery is inscribed on the list of Georgia's Immovable Cultural Monuments of National Significance.

== Architecture ==
The Tiri monastery is located near the village of Monasteri, in the valley of Tiri, a tributary of the Greater Liakhvi River, 9 km northwest of Tskhinvali. The monastery consists of the church of the Nativity of the Theotokos, a bell-tower, and the ruins of a refectory, rock-cut cells, a circuit wall, and other accessory structures. They are mostly built of dressed basalt blocks, with the additional use of brick and cobblestone.

The church of the Nativity of the Theotokos, measuring 15.7 × 8.8 m., is dated to the latter half of the 13th century. It is built as a rectangular hall church with an apse of the sanctuary separated from the nave by a contemporaneous five-arched iconostasis, which has lost its original appearance and has then been somewhat haphazardly reassembled. The sanctuary bears the surviving fragments of the 14th–15th century frescoes. In the 1420s, the church was expanded with a now-ruined porch and an eukterion. The north annex, a crypt of the noble family of Tavkhelidze, was added in the 1480s. The façades are adorned with decorative stone carvings. A two-storey bell-tower was constructed adjacent to the west side of the church at the end of the 14th century by the Tavkhelidze, who owned the monastery. In the 16th century Tiri passed to the princes Taktakidze, who built a family crypt at the northeast end of the church in 1682.

=== Inscriptions ===
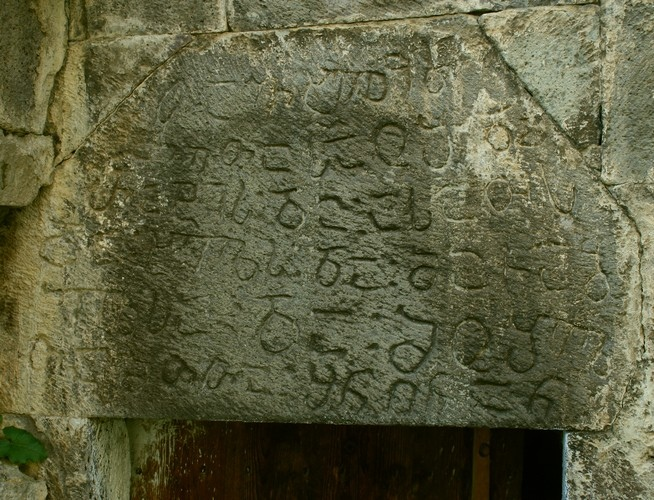
A 14th-century Georgian inscription on the bell-tower.

Three stone inscriptions in Georgian survive on the outer walls of the monastery: two on the north and south annexes of the church, respectively, and one on the bell-tower. The latter inscription, undated but probably made at the end of the 14th century in the medieval Georgian asomtavruli script, is placed on an architrave stone on the east door of the bell-tower, mentioning members of the Tavkhelisdze family: Siaosh, Rati, Asat, and Machabel. The inscription on the west wall of the south annex, a small chapel, in asomtavruli and also undated, commemorates the certain treasurer Khela and Bevroz Makhatlishvili. The third text, dated to 1682 and is inscribed in the north crypt of the church in mkhedruli, attributes the structure to the members of the Taktakidze family: the bishop Phillip of Ruisi, Ardashel, and Elizbar.

There is also a barely discernible two-line asomtavruli inscription in the interior of the eukterion, making mention of the bishop Phillip. A marble tombstone in front of the iconostasis carries a mkhedruli text, arranged in twelve lines, which indicates that buried here is Rostom (died in 1689 or 1698), a son of the prince royal Vakhtang of Kartli. Next to this tombstone was that of Erekle, son of Prince Giorgi Machabeli, who died fighting under the Georgian king Erekle II at Erivan in 1777. These epitaphs were first published by the French student of the Caucasian antiquities, Marie-Félicité Brosset, in 1850.

== History ==
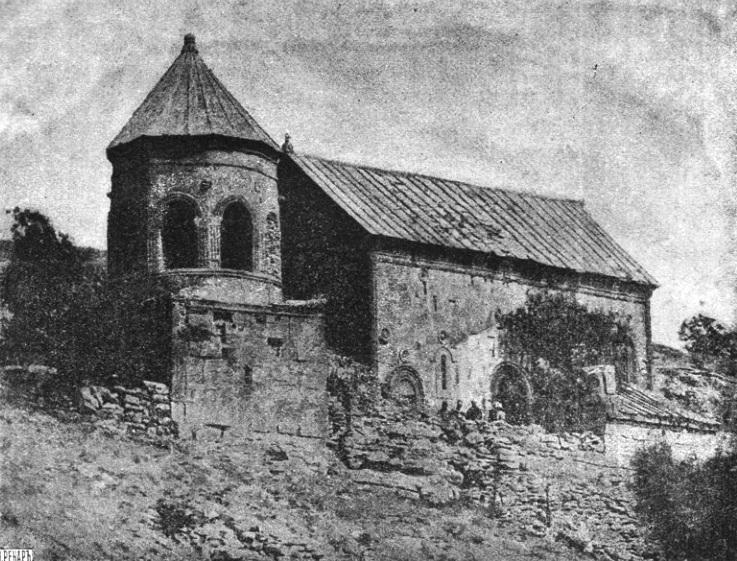
Tiri Monastery. A photo from the book by Countess Uvarova, 1894.

The Tiri monastery is mentioned in several Georgian historical documents from the 15th to the 18th century. Prince Vakhushti of Kartli, a Georgian scholar writing about 1745, reports that west of the Achabeti Fortress, "on a hill, there is the Tiri monastery, without a dome, but beautifully built, in a pleasant place. An abbot sits there." After the Russian takeover of Georgia, the monastery was abolished and Tiri was converted to a parish church in 1811.

During the August 2008 Russo-Georgian War, the area where the monastery is located fell under the control of Russian and South Ossetian forces. As a result, the Georgian clergy and parish lost access to the Tiri church. In the immediate aftermath of the hostilities, a 19 August 2008 UNOSAT satellite image reported no visible damage to the church. The convent continued to function intermittently until being dissolved in 2010. In July 2015, the monastery was subjected to a "repair" process in which part of the frescoes were whitewashed or damaged; the floor in the bell-tower was covered with concrete, and a new wall was built to encircle the church. The South Ossetian authorities claimed ignorance and ordered the works to be suspended. Georgia's Ministry of Culture expressed concerns regarding "uncontrolled activities" at cultural monuments in breakaway Abkhazia and South Ossetia. In 2016, the Permanent Mission of Georgia to the United Nations Office reported to the UN Special Rapporteur in the Field of cultural rights that the Tiri Monastery required an immediate intervention in order to prevent further damage from humidity and water infiltration.
