= Gvinjina =

Village in Tighva municipality, Georgia

Gvinjina გვინჯინა
- Location within Georgia Location within Shida Kartli
- Municipality: Tighva
- Time zone: UTC+4 (Georgian Time)

Gvinjina (Georgian: გვინჯინა) is a village in Georgia, located in the Tighva Municipality (Kornisi Community). Until 1991, it was part of the Znauri District. The village is situated on the left bank of the Eastern Prone River, at an elevation of 960 meters above sea level, 13 kilometers from Kornisi.
