= Kurta Municipality =

Kurta Municipality ქურთის მუნიციპალიტეტი
- Municipality
- Flag Coat of arms

- Country: Georgia
- Region: Shida Kartli
- Established: 6 December 2006

Population
  - Estimate (2009): 7,100
- Time zone: UTC+4

Kurta Municipality (Georgian: ქურთის მუნიციპალიტეტი, romanized: kurtis munitsip’alit’et’i) is a temporary administrative-territorial unit located in eastern Georgia, within the territory of Gori Municipality. It was established on December 6, 2006. Currently, it is under occupation by the Russian Federation.

== History ==
Based on the decree №2304-rs issued by the president of Georgia, Mikheil Saakashvili, on December 16, 2005, the reorganization of Georgia's districts was carried out, transforming the existing districts into municipalities.

The public legal entity "Kurta Municipality" (ID: 218065064) was registered as a taxpayer on November 17, 2006, and its official registration date is December 6, 2006.

== Local self-government ==
The municipality includes 10 settlements (villages): Achabeti (Zemo Achabeti and Kvemo Achabeti), Gujabauri, Tamarasheni, Kekhvi, Monasteri (Zemo Monasteri and Kvemo Monasteri), Sveri, Kemerti, Kurta, Dzartsemi, and Kheiti.
