= Gadigina =

Village in Tighva municipality, Georgia

Gadigina გადიგინა
- Municipality: Tighva
- Time zone: UTC+4 (Georgian Time)

Gadigina (Georgian: გადიგინა) is a village in Georgia, located in the Tighva municipality (Teregvani community). It's situated in the valley of the Shua Prone river. It's located 1000 meters above sea level and is 22 kilometers away from Kornisi.
