= Akhalsopeli (Tighva municipality) =

Village in Tighva, Georgia

Akhalsopeli ახალსოფელი
- Location within Georgia Location within Shida Kartli
- Coordinates: 42°11′31″N 43°46′43″E
- Country: Georgia (official); Republic of South Ossetia (de facto)
- Municipality: Tighva
- Time zone: UTC+4 (Georgian Time)

Akhalsopeli (Georgian: ახალსოფელი) is a village in the Tighva Municipality in Georgia. It is currently under the de facto control of the separatist Republic of South Ossetia. Until 1991, it was part of Kornisi district. It is located about 1 km away from Kornisi and sits at an elevation of 800 meters above sea level.
