= House of Tbeli =

Georgian feudal family

Tbeli ტბელი
- Country: Tbeti
- Founded: 9th century
- Founder: Ivane Tbeli
- Titles: Eristavi (Duke)

Genealogy of Tbeli family

The Tbeli family (Georgian: ტბელები) was the great feudal family in the ninth and tenth century Georgia. The family name derives from their domain of Tbeti, currently located in Shida Kartli.

== History ==
In the tenth century Tbelis were one of the powerful feudals in Kartli. Their fiefdom was centered in Liakhvi gorge (villages: Tbeti, Eredvi, Nikozi, Bortsvisjvari, Dodoti etc.). Bortsvisjvari Church near Tskhinvali, gives rich information about the Tbelis. From the content of the inscriptions it can be found out that Tskhinvali and its surroundings was the domain of the Tbelis. Inscriptions of the Dodoti Tskhrakari Church says that it was built by the local feudal lord, Ivane Tbeli and his son Kavtar Tbeli. On the inscriptions of Eredvi Basilica Ivane's name is mentioned among sovereigns of Kartli, while in Dodoti Tskhrakara church, he is mentioned as Eristavi (duke), where he was probably appointed by the George II of Abkhazia, who later would his son Constantine as Eristavi of Kartli, but the latter engineered a coup against his father three years later, where Tbelis (perhaps Ivane and his five sons) took part and were defeated. The rebels were punished and expelled from Kartli to Vaspurakan. In the tenth century aristocratic opposition of Kartli led by Kavtar Tbeli revolted against Bagrat III of Georgia and ran their fiefdoms as semi-independent rulers. When Bagrat returned to Kartli to deal with this situation, the nobles offered him an armed resistance, but the king won the battle at Moghrisi in 982, and forced the rebels into submission.

== Sources ==
- Shoshiashvili N., Georgian Soviet Encyclopedia, IX, p. 680, Tbilisi, 1985
