= Gvirgvina (Balta community) =

Village in Georgia (country)

Gvirgvina გვირგვინა
- Location within Georgia Location within Shida Kartli
- Municipality: Tighva
- Time zone: UTC+4 (Georgian Time)

Gvirgvina (Georgian: გვირგვინა) is a village in Georgia, located in the Tighva Municipality (Balta Community).

It is located on the eastern slope of the Likhi Range, by the Lopani River, at an elevation of 920 meters above sea level. It is 32 kilometers from Kareli and 22 kilometers from Aghara (the nearest railway station). The Ossetians refer to it as Didindzhin.

From 1922 to 1990, it was part of the Znauri District of the South Ossetian Autonomous Region. From 1990 to 2006, it was in the Kareli District, and since 2006, it has been in the Tighva municipality. It is currently occupied by the Russian Federation. According to the 1989 census, it had a population of 45, all of whom were ethnically Ossetian. There are no permanent residents at present.

The International Committee of the Red Cross supplied agricultural seeds to 10 households in Gvirgvina from 2009 to 2011.
