= Khetagurovo =

Khetagurovo ხეთაგუროვი Къостайыхъæу Цунар
- Town
- Etymology: named after Ossetian poet Kosta Khetagurov
- Location within South Ossetia Location within Shida Kartli Location within Georgia
- Coordinates: 42°12′31″N 43°53′35″E
- Country: South Ossetia/Georgia
- District: Tskhinvali district

Area
  - Total: 1.025 km^{2} (0.396 sq mi)
- Elevation: 920 m (3,020 ft)

Population (August, 2008)
  - Total: 750
  - Density: 730/km^{2} (1,900/sq mi)
- Time zone: UTC+3 (Moscow time)
  - Summer (DST): UTC+4 (Moscow summer time)
- Number of houses: 150 (as of August 7th, 2008)

Khetagurovo (Tsunari until 1940) (Georgian: ხეთაგუროვი, khetagurovi; Iron Ossetic: Къостайыхъæу, K'ostajyqæw) is a 150-house village in South Ossetia, de facto independent partially recognized republic in the South Caucasus, formerly the South Ossetian Autonomous Oblast within the Georgian Soviet Socialist Republic. The village has been controlled by the South Ossetian forces since the armed clashes with the Georgian troops in 1991/1992. Until 1991 village was part of Tskhinvali district, Gori municipality. Sakrebulo center (villages: Bagata, Galuanta, Tibilaani, Kroza, Kusireti, Tbeti, Kvasatali, Grubela, Khodi).

== Geography ==
Village is located on the plain of Shida Kartli, on the bank of the river Tiliani (eastern Prone basin) and Kekhvi canal. 900 meters above sea level, 7 kilometers from Tskhinvali. The historic village of Tsunari, presently Khetagurovo, is one of the historical villages of Shida Kartli. Here stands the Church of the Virgin of Tsunari.

== 2008 South Ossetia War ==
Khetagurovo is situated 5 kilometers west of Tskhinvali, capital of South Ossetia. On the west and south, it borders 3 Georgian villages Nuli, Avnevi and Didmuha. As can be seen on satellite images, Khetagorovo had four Ossetian defense positions outside the village in the south and southwest in direct 1-2 kilometer sight of Georgian defense positions at Avnevi and Didmuha. The strategic importance of Khetagorogo was due to its position at the road connecting Georgian-controlled parts of south-western South Ossetia with Tskhinvali and giving access (2 kilometers north-east) to the only Ossetian-controlled road that connected Tskhinvali with Russia through South Ossetian town of Java.

During the 2008 Battle for Tskhinvali, the village was assaulted, on the night from 7 to 8 of August, by the Georgian government troops. The Georgian side accused the Ossetian militias of using the village as their base for shelling of the nearby villages earlier in August 2008 while South Ossetians claimed that Georgians had been shelling Khetagurovo from Avnevi"

According to the then-de facto South Ossetian prime-minister Yuri Morozov, Khetagurovo was badly damaged by Georgian troops. According to the Regnum News Agency, villagers said "Georgian forces burned down a church while terrified civilians perished inside". The report also said "Georgian soldiers kidnapped, raped and tortured young girls of Khetagurovo, Georgian tanks ran people down". A journalist of Reuters claimed that on August 8, Georgian troops killed eight people and badly damaged the village.

The Georgian government admitted that Khetagurovo was the "only [Ossetian] village that sustained severe damage due to the location of substantial amounts of military equipment and forces around the village", but rejected claims about cruel or degrading treatment of the civilian population after the Georgian forces' seizure of the area.

The Human Rights Watch (HRW) fact-finding mission reported the "indiscriminate fire" by the Georgian troops and shelling of the village by multiple-launch rocket system "Grad" and tanks. According to HRW, at least four civilians died as a result of Georgian attack. But none of the villagers interviewed by it "complained about cruel or degrading treatment by Georgian servicemen, who searched the houses looking for remaining militias and arms."
