= Akhasheni, Tighva municipality =

Village in Tighva municipality, Georgia

Akhasheni ახაშენი
- Location within Georgia Location within Shida Kartli
- Country: Georgia
- Municipality: Tighva
- Time zone: UTC+4 (Georgian Time)

Akhasheni (Georgian: ახაშენი) is a village in Tighva municipality, Georgia. It is located on the Inner Kartli Plain, on the Shua Prone River. 840 meters above sea level, 3 kilometers from Kornisi.
