= List of volcanoes in Georgia =

This is a list of active and extinct volcanoes in Georgia.

Name	Elevation		Location	Last eruption
Name	meters	feet	Coordinates	Last eruption
Dzau				200,000 - 100,000 years ago
Kabargin Oth Group	3650	11975	42.55°N 44.00°E	Holocene
Mount Kazbek	5050	16,568	42.70°N 44.50°E	750 BC
Keli Highland	3750	12,303	42.45°N 44.25°E	Holocene
Samsari	3285	10,778 ft	41.32°N 43.40°E	Late Quaternary
