= Bziskhevi =

Village in Tighva municipality, Georgia

Bziskhevi ბზისხევი
- Location within Georgia Location within Shida Kartli
- Coordinates: 42°12′58″N 43°37′56″E
- Country: Georgia
- Region: Shida Kartli
- Administrative district: Tighva municipality

Bziskhevi (Georgian: ბზისხევი) is a village in Georgia, located in Tighva municipality (Balta community). It is situated on the eastern slope of the Likhi Range, on the banks of the Lopanistskali River. The village is 920 meters above sea level and 30 kilometers from Kornisi.
