= Ganitkau =

Village in Tighva municipality, Georgia

Ganitkau განითყაუ
- Location within Georgia
- Municipality: Tighva
- Time zone: UTC+4 (Georgian Time)

Ganitkau (Georgian: განითყაუ) is a village in Georgia, located in the Karel Municipality (Qornisi community). Until 1991, it was part of the Znauri district. The village is situated in the valley of the Western Prone River, at an elevation of 1,000 meters above sea level, and is 15 kilometers from Qornisi.
