= Administrative divisions of South Ossetia =

Overview of the levels of political administration in South Ossetia

South Ossetia is subdivided into four districts (raions):

Name			Population	
English	Ossetian	Russian	1989	2015
Dzau District	Дзауы район	Дзауский район	10 418	6 567
Leningor District	Ленингоры район	Ленингорский район	12 073	4 209
Tskhinvali District (remainder)	Цхинвалы район	Цхинвальский район	23 514	7 793
Znaur District	Знауыры район	Знаурский район	10 189	6 567
City of Tskhinvali (part of Tskhinvali District)	Цхинвал	Цхинвал	42 934	30 432
