= Arkneti =

Village in Tighva, Georgia

Arkneti არკნეთი
- Interactive map of Arkneti
- Coordinates: 42°13′27″N 43°50′55″E
- Country: Georgia
- Municipality: Tighva
- Elevation: 885 m (2,904 ft)

Arkneti is a village in Georgia, located in the Tighva Municipality, in the Nuli community. It is situated on the left bank of the Aghmosavleti Fronis River, at an altitude of 885 meters above sea level, 17 kilometers from Tskhinvali.

== History ==
In historical sources, it is known as "Erkneti". Prince Vakhushti of Kartli notes: "Above the Tsunari Gorge is the church of Erkneti; Greek monks from Mount Athos reside there."

This village had an estate belonging to the Jerusalem Cross Monastery. It is mentioned in the 1794-1799 census of Ioane Bagrationi. Since 2008, it has been occupied by Russia and de facto controlled by the Republic of South Ossetia. According to the administrative division of South Ossetia, it is part of the Znauri District, Tskhinvali community.

== Notable sites ==
The 1955 exploratory expedition of Shida Kartli discovered a Late Bronze Age settlement mound in Arkneti. At the site "Vasatsqaro", ancient and new era pit graves were found containing pottery, glass and paste beads, bronze jewelry, silver rings, and iron bracelets. One pit grave contained five silver Parthian coins from the 1st century BC. The village has a hall church of Mary.
