= Baghiani =

Baghiani ბაღიანი
- Village
- Location within Georgia Location within Shida Kartli
- Coordinates: 42°10′44″N 43°43′29″E
- Country: Georgia
- Municipality: Tighva
- Elevation: 800 m (2,600 ft)
- Time zone: UTC+4 (Georgian Time)

Baghiani (Georgian: ბაღიანი) is a village in Georgia, located in Tighva municipality (Dzvileti community). Until 1991, it was part of Qorni district. It is situated on the watershed between the Eastern Phroni and Middle Phroni rivers. The village is 800 meters above sea level and 10 kilometers from Qorni.
