= Tamarasheni =

Coordinates: 42°15′2.61″N 43°57′45.15″E

Tamarasheni in Georgia

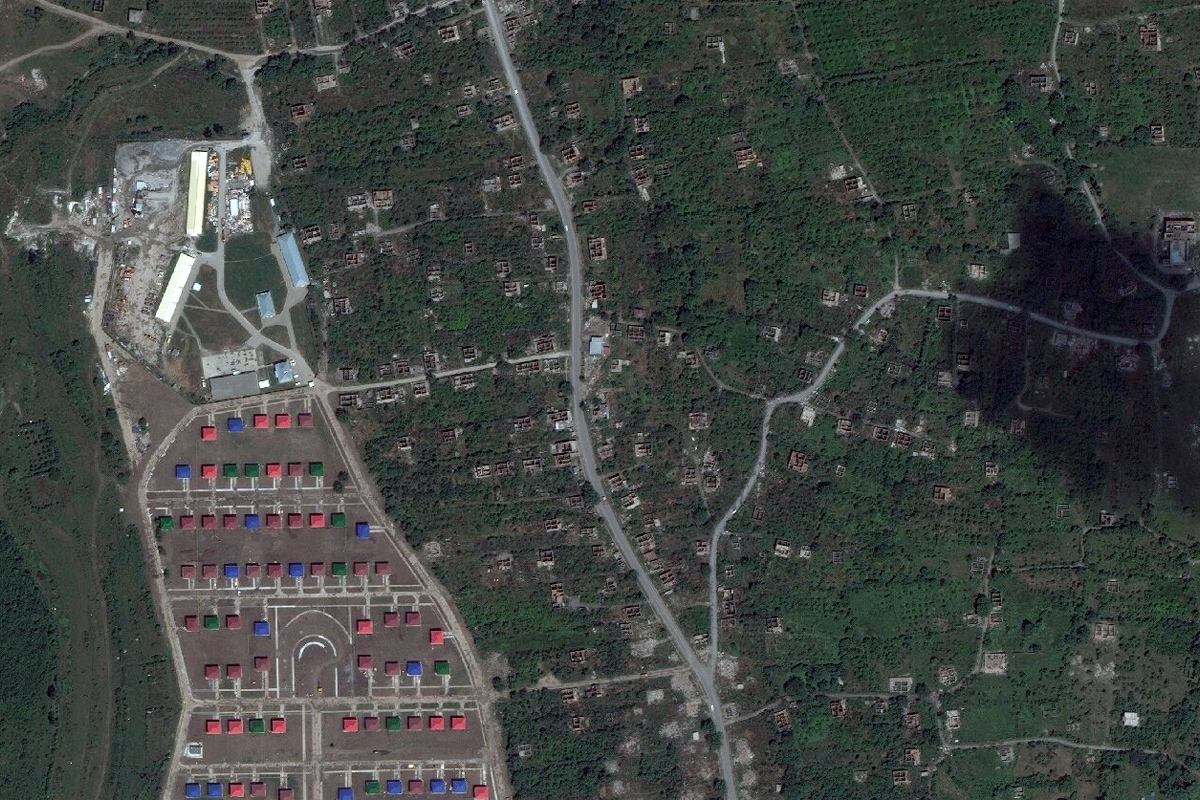
remains of Tamarasheni, aerial view, 2010

Tamarasheni (Georgian: თამარაშენი) is a former village in Georgia, within the territory controlled by separatist South Ossetia, some 0.5 km north of Tskhinvali.

Per Georgian administrative division the village is in Shida Kartli region. During the 2008 South Ossetia War, the village was completely destroyed by the Ossetian forces and depopulated of its majority Georgian population. After the war, the South Ossetian regime included the former Tamarasheni territory in Tskhinvali as a "Moscow Microdistrict" inaugurated by the mayor of Moscow Yuri Luzhkov.

The village is situated in the Great Liakhvi River valley. Tradition holds it that the modern-day village was founded by the medieval queen Tamar of Georgia (1284–1212) as a small town. Hence, the settlement's name, literally meaning "built by Tamar". It was formerly part of the late medieval Georgian princedom of Samachablo (literally, "the estate of the Machabeli [family]") and then of the former South Ossetian Autonomous Oblast (abolished in 1990). Populated mostly by ethnic Georgians, the village lies within the ongoing Georgian–Ossetian conflict zone, and remained under the government of Georgia's control till the 2008 South Ossetia War.

Tamarasheni is a home to a museum of the 19th-century Georgian writer and Shakespeare translator Ivane Machabeli who was born there in 1854. The museum was severely damaged on July 23, 1997, in a blast allegedly organized by local Ossetian separatists.

Most of the village's houses were destroyed during the 2008 South Ossetia War by Ossetian militias.

== See also ==
- Ethnic cleansing of Georgians in South Ossetia
- Shida Kartli
