= Achabeti Fortress =

Historic fortress in country of Georgia

- აჩაბეთი ციხე
- Ruins of Achabeti fortress
- Interactive map of Achabeti Fortress
- Location: Gori Municipality, Shida Kartli, Georgia
- Coordinates: 42°16′48″N 43°56′59″E
- Type: Cyclopean fortress

Achabeti Fortess is an old fortress in Georgia, Gori Municipality, in the village of Achabeti. The fortress is situated along the right bank of the river Liakhvi.

== History ==
Little is known about Achabeti. Today the villages of Zemo Achabeti and Kvemo Achabeti lie in the Tskhinvali region. According to Georgian sources, in the late feudal epoch, a "palace and fortress of kings" here gave its name to the entire valley. In 1744 near Achabeti Erekle II defeated Givi Amilakhvari (1689–1754) and the Turkish army. Achabeti is associated with the Anchabadze family; the name "Achabeti" means "place where the Anchabadzes lived". A new feudal branch "Machabeli", derived from this family.

Achabeti fortress was first mentioned in the 16th century. It was famous for its robustness.

At first the fortress was only a tower with a small wall, but it has been rebuilt several times and became larger.
