= Kusireti =

Settlement in South Ossetia

Kusireti Georgian: კუსირეთი Iron Ossetic: Къусрет
- Village
- Location within South Ossetia Location within Shida Kartli Location within Georgia
- Coordinates: 42°14′23″N 43°56′18″E
- Country: Georgia
- De facto state: South Ossetia (Note: South Ossetia's status is disputed. It considers itself to be an independent state, but this is recognised by only a few other countries. The Georgian government and most of the world's other states consider South Ossetia de jure a part of Georgia's territory.)
- Time zone: UTC+4 (Georgian Time)

Kusireti (Georgian: კუსირეთი; Iron Ossetic: Къусрет) is a settlement in the Khetagurovo Community, Tskhinvali district of South Ossetia, Georgia.

== Geography ==
Located on Shida Kartli plain. 900 meters above sea level.

== See also ==
- Tskhinvali District
