= Balta (Tighva municipality) =

Village in Tighva municipality, Georgia

Balta ბალთა
- Village
- Location within Georgia
- Coordinates: 42°10′44″N 43°43′29″E
- Country: Georgia
- Municipality: Tighva
- Time zone: UTC+4 (Georgian Time)

Balta is a village in Georgia, located in the Tighva municipality. It serves as the center of the Tighva community, which includes the villages of Bziskhevi, Gvirgvina, Lashebalta, Lopani, Metechi, Seribalta, Fatkineti, Kaleti, and Tsneli. The village is situated on the Inner Kartli Plain, on the banks of the Western Prone River. It is 830 meters above sea level and 9 kilometers from Kurnisi.
