= Dzau (volcano) =

- Territory: Georgia
- Region: Shida Kartli
- Age: Between 200,000 and 100,000 years old
- Latest activity: Quaternary

Dzau is a volcanic centre in Georgia (country), Russian-occupied de facto South Ossetia. It is also known as Java volcanic centre. The field is close to the town of Dzau, in the Greater Liakhvi River valley.

The Caucasus has been affected by volcanic activity during the Late Cenozoic in three areas. One of these is the Kazbek area with the Kazbek, Keli Highland and Dzau systems which were active during the Quaternary.

It contains three volcanoes, Tsru (42.381026°N 44.021899°E) also known as Chvriva at 1,500 metres (4,900 ft) altitude, Sazeleti (42.404431°N 44.003830°E) at 1,904 metres (6,247 ft) altitude and Bordzhnis or Borgnisi (42.429351°N 43.969033°E) at 1,300 metres (4,300 ft) altitude. Sazeleti is a lava cone, the other two volcanoes are fissure vents. Remnants of lava flows have also been found.

The volcanic field has erupted principally andesite. Minerals found in the rocks include amphibole, clinopyroxene, orthopyroxene and plagioclase.

The volcanoes are possibly between 200,000 and 100,000 years old.
