= Alibari =

Village in Georgia

Coordinates: 42°12′17″N 43°45′26″E

Alibari ალიბარი
- Interactive map of Alibari
- Country: Georgia
- Municipality: Tighvi

Alibari (Georgian: ალიბარი) is a village in Georgia, in the Tighvi municipality (Kornisi community). It is located on the banks of the East Proni River. 880 meters above sea level, 3 kilometers from Kornisi.
