= Yuri Kokoyev =

Russian footballer (born 1980)

Personal information
- Full name: Yuri Yuryevich Kokoyev
- Date of birth: 21 August 1980 (age 46)
- Place of birth: Tskhinvali, Georgian SSR
- Height: 1.84 m (6 ft 1/2 in)
- Position: Forward

Senior career*
Years	Team	Apps	(Gls)
1997	FC Spartak Anapa	33	(2)
1998	FC Alania Vladikavkaz	1	(0)
1998	→ FC Alania-d Vladikavkaz (loan)	29	(1)
2000	FC Zhemchuzhina Sochi	9	(2)
2001–2002	FC Kuzbass-Dynamo Kemerovo	43	(4)
2002–2003	FC Avtodor Vladikavkaz	34	(2)
2003	FC Spartak Anapa	12	(2)
2004	FC Dynamo Stavropol	17	(3)
2005	FC Novorossiysk (amateur)		
2007	FC Nara-Desna Naro-Fominsk	11	(1)
2007	FC Zhemchuzhina-A Sochi		
- * Club domestic league appearances and goals

Yuri Yuryevich Kokoyev (Russian: Юрий Юрьевич Кокоев; born 21 August 1980) is a former Russian football player.
