= Kabargin Oth Group =

- Location within Georgia Location within Shida Kartli

Highest point
- Elevation: 3,650 m (11,980 ft)
- Coordinates: 42°31′38″N 44°00′20″E

Geography
- Location: Georgia (South Ossetia)
- Parent range: Caucasus Mountains

Geology
- Mountain type: Cinder cones
- Last eruption: Unknown

Kabargin Oth Group is a group of volcanoes located in Georgia (South Ossetia). It consists of a dozen cinder cones and lava domes and is located near the border with Russia, southwest of Mount Kazbek volcano.

== See also ==
- List of volcanoes in Georgia (country)
