= Vadim Laliev =

Olympic wrestler (born 1980)

Personal information
- Born: 12 December 1980 (age 45) Tskhinvali, South Ossetia, Georgia, Soviet Union
- Height: 1.77 m (5 ft 9 1/2 in)
- Weight: 88 kg (194 lb)

Sport
- Sport: Wrestling
- Event: Freestyle
- Coached by: Alan Tehov
Medal record
Men's freestyle wrestling
Representing Russia
European Championships
Bronze medal – third place	2003 Riga	84 kg
Representing Armenia
European Championships
Bronze medal – third place	2006 Moscow	84 kg

Vadim Laliev (born 12 December 1980) is a retired Ossetian Freestyle wrestler. He joined the Russian national wrestling team in 1999 and switched to the Armenian national wrestling team in 2006. Laliev won a bronze medal at the European Wrestling Championships twice, in 2003 representing Russia and in 2006 representing Armenia. He is the younger brother of Olympic silver medalist Gennadiy Laliev.
