= Zemo Monasteri =

Zemo Monasteri Georgian: ზემო მონასტერი
- Village
- Location within South Ossetia Location within Shida Kartli Location within Georgia
- Coordinates: 42°17′08″N 43°54′53″E
- Country: Georgia
- De facto state: South Ossetia (Note: South Ossetia's status is disputed. It considers itself to be an independent state, but this is recognised by only a few other countries. The Georgian government and most of the world's other states consider South Ossetia de jure a part of Georgia's territory.)

Population (2016)
  - Total: 50
- Time zone: UTC+4 (Georgian Time)

Zemo Monasteri (Georgian: ზემო მონასტერი) is a settlement in the Tskhinvali district of South Ossetia, a region of Georgia whose sovereignty is disputed.

== See also ==
- Tskhinvali district
