= St. Mary's Church, Tskhinvali =

Coordinates: 42.2186°N 43.9669°E

St. Mary's Church
- Ցխինվալի Սուրբ Աստվածածին եկեղեցի ცხინვალის ღვთისმშობლის მიძინების საკათედრო ტაძარი
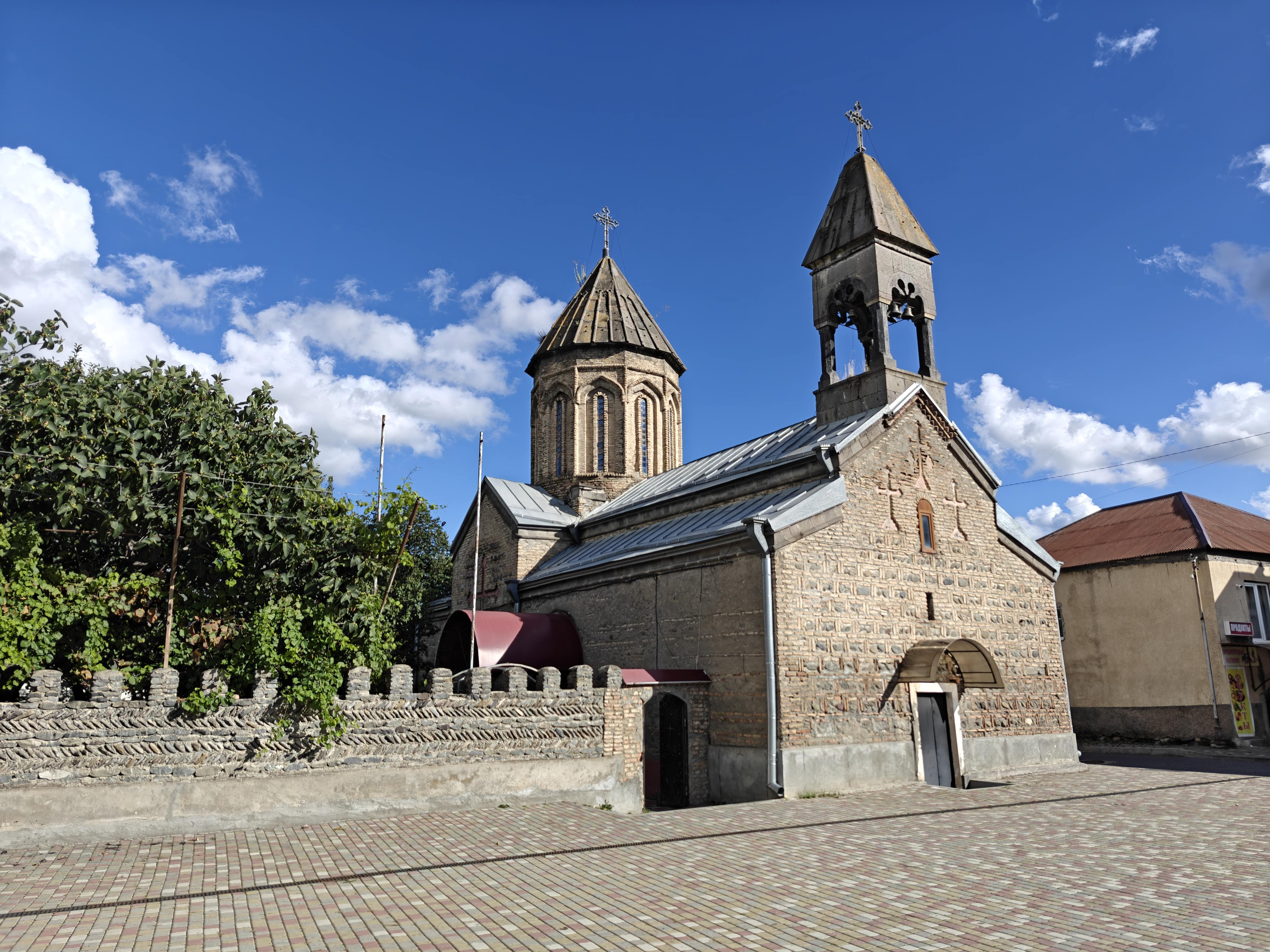
- St. Mary's Church
- Location: Tskhinvali
- Country: disputed between South Ossetia; Georgia
- Denomination: Armenian Apostolic Church

The St. Mary's Church (Armenian: Ցխինվալի Սուրբ Աստվածածին եկեղեցի, Georgian: ცხინვალის ღვთისმშობლის მიძინების საკათედრო ტაძარი), also called Church of the Nativity of the Blessed Virgin, is a church of the Armenian Apostolic Church in the center of Tskhinvali, the capital of South Ossetia, a de facto independent region claimed by Georgia.

The church is used by various Orthodox Christian groups in South Ossetia. It was damaged during the night of August 7 to 8, 2008, in a bombing during the war between Russia and Georgia.

The Church of the Blessed Virgin was built in 1718. The church has a dome and was constructed using brick and stone. The masonry walls of the facade are embedded with large crosses and arches.

== See also ==
- Christianity in Georgia
- St. Mary's Church (disambiguation)
