= Tskhinvali railway station =

Railway station in Tskhinvali, Georgia

Tskhinvali

General information
- Location: South Ossetia, Tskhinvali; Georgia
- Coordinates: 42.2286°N 43.9612°E
- System: Georgian Railway terminal (de jure)
- Owner: South Ossetian Government
- Platforms: 3 (2 island platforms)
- Tracks: 5

Construction
- Parking: yes

Other information
- Station code: 579407

History
- Opened: 1940
- Closed: 1991 (as a rail terminal)
- Former names: Stalinir

Services
Preceding station	Georgian Railway	Following station
Location

Tskhinvali Railway station was a railway terminal in the capital of South Ossetia — Tskhinvali.

== History ==
Until 1991 the station was to end the 33-kilometer line of the Transcaucasian Railway from the station in Gori. Currently, rail service is not available, the building is used as a bus station.

The railway Gori—Tskhinvali was opened on 8 June 1940. At that moment Tskhinvali was called Stalinir.

In 1991 the railway was stopped because of the Georgian–Ossetian conflict.

In 1992 the station building was destroyed by the Georgian army and rebuilt only in 2002.

In 2004 Georgian Government wanted to reopen the railway for passengers and goods, but after Saakashvili became president, the plans were forgotten.

Now the station is used as the main bus station of the town.
