= Georges V. Matchabelli =

Georigan noble and American businessman

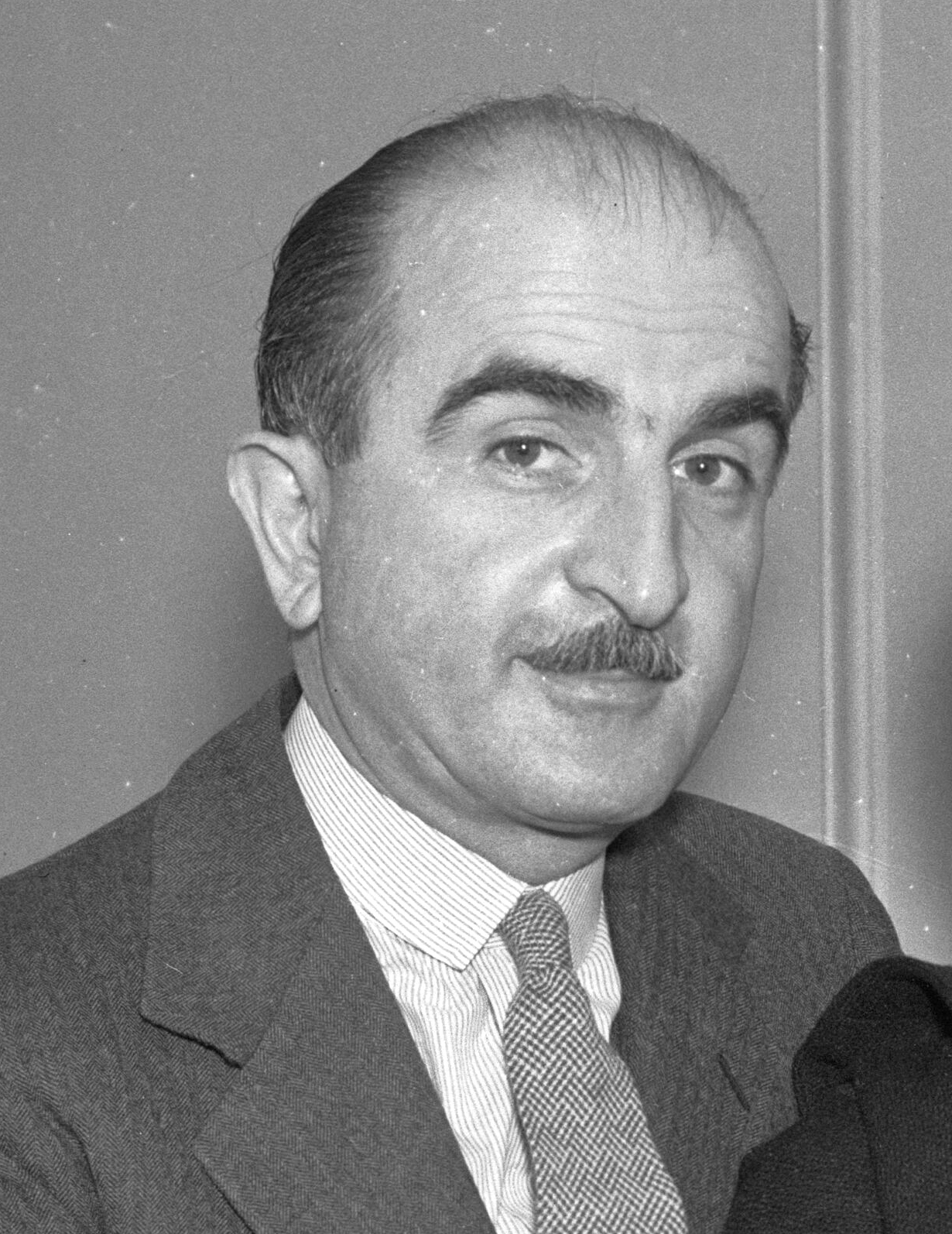
- Matchabelli in 1924
- Born: Georges Vasili Matchabelli; July 23, 1885; Tbilisi, Georgia, Russian Empire
- Died: March 31, 1935 (aged 49); New York City, United States
- Occupations: Diplomat; Perfume Manufacturer
- Title: Prince
- Spouse: Princess Norina Matchabelli

Prince Georges Vasili Matchabelli (Georgian: გიორგი მაჩაბელი; July 23, 1885 – March 31, 1935) was a Georgian perfumer. A nobleman and diplomat, he emigrated to the United States after the 1921 Soviet invasion of Georgia.

== Origins and education ==
Matchabelli was born in Tiflis, Georgia, then part of Imperial Russia. By birth, he was member of the House of Machabeli, an old Georgian noble family and a nephew of the writer Ivane Machabeli. He studied in Tiflis and later in Berlin as an engineer. He was one of the founding members of the Committee of Independent Georgia organized in Berlin in 1914. The Committee intended to garner the German support for Georgia's struggle for independence from the Russian Empire.

== Marriage and career ==
Prince Matchabelli perfume, designed by his wife, Princess Norina Matchabelli, whose scent "Ave Maria" was named for her in 1926

In 1917 Matchabelli married Norina Gilli (born in Florence, Italy) who had become famous for her portrayal of the Madonna in Max Reinhardt's unique 1911 pantomime spectacle play The Miracle. He briefly served as part of the embassy of the Democratic Republic of Georgia to Italy. With the establishment of Soviet rule in Georgia in 1921, Matchabelli, with his wife Norina, moved to the United States.

The prince was an amateur chemist and in 1924 he and his wife, now known as Princess Norina Matchabelli, established the Prince Matchabelli Perfume Company. Norina designed the crown shaped perfume vial in the likeness of the Matchabelli crown and in 1926 the scent "Ave Maria" was named for her. The company became known for color-coded, crown-shaped bottles that housed such classics as Wind Song, Ave Maria, and Princess Norina. The Matchabellis divorced in 1933.

From 1932 until his death, Matchabelli also served as President of the Georgian Association in the United States. Georges died in New York City in 1935 and was buried in Mount Olivet Cemetery in Queens, New York. In 1936, Norina sold the company to perfume manufacturer Saul Ganz for $250,000.

== See also ==
- Samachablo
- Machabeli
