= Tbeti =

Settlement in South Ossetia

Tbeti Georgian: ტბეთი Iron Ossetic: Тъыбет
- Village
- Location within South Ossetia Location within Shida Kartli Location within Georgia
- Coordinates: 42°13′36.36″N 43°55′28.48″E
- Country: Georgia
- De facto state: South Ossetia (Note: South Ossetia's status is disputed. It considers itself to be an independent state, but this is recognised by only a few other countries. The Georgian government and most of the world's other states consider South Ossetia de jure a part of Georgia's territory.)
- Time zone: UTC+4 (Georgian Time)

Tbeti (Georgian: ტბეთი, romanized: t'beti; Iron Ossetic: Тъыбет) is a settlement in the Khetagurovo Community, Tskhinvali district of South Ossetia, Georgia. It is located 2 kilometers west of Tskhinvali.

== Geography ==
Located on Shida Kartli plain. 900 meters above sea level.

== See also ==
- Tskhinvali District
- Gori municipality
