= Giorgi Kartvelishvili =

Giorgi Kartvelishvili გიორგი ქართველიშვილი
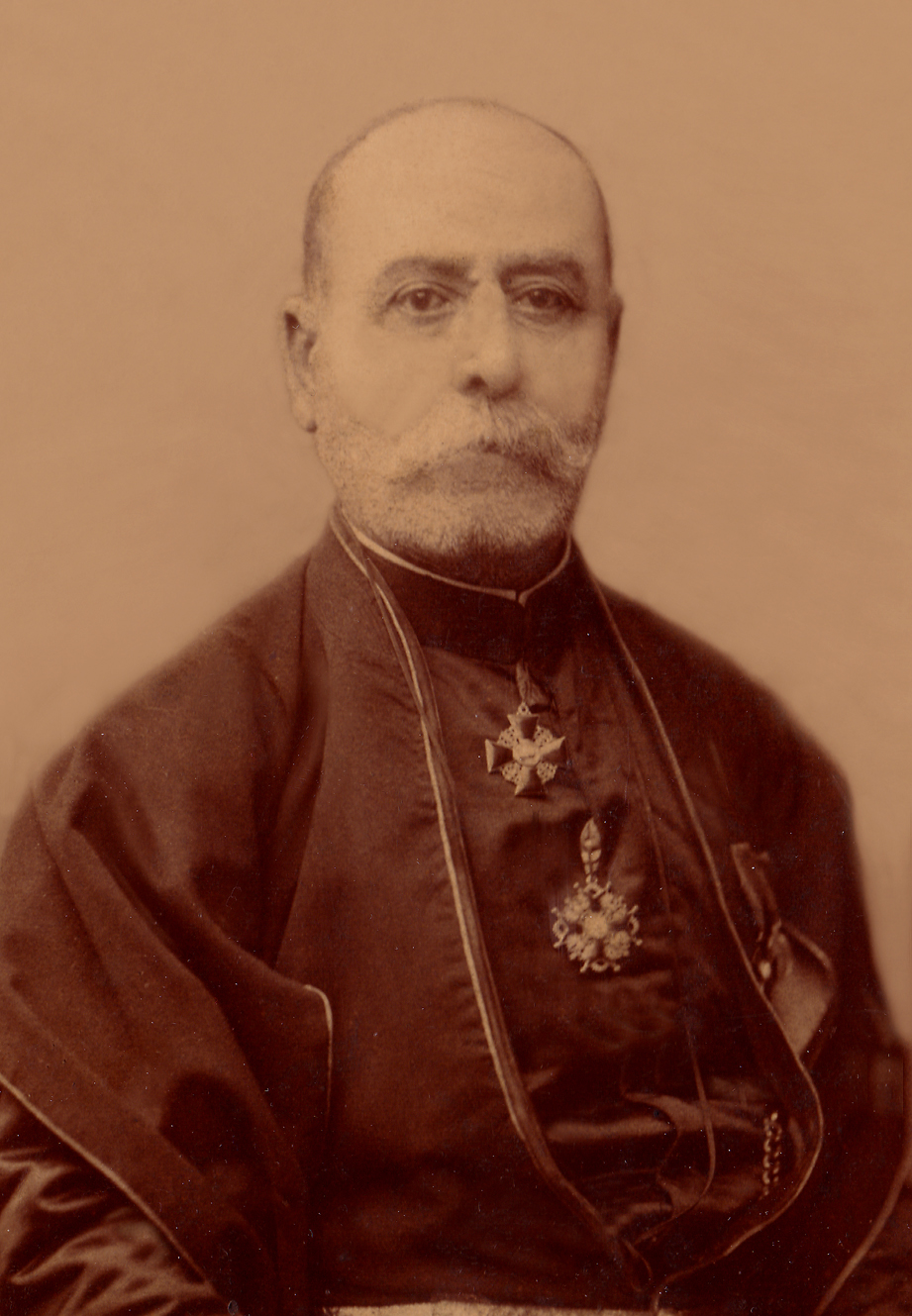
- Giorgi Kartvelishvili
- Born: 1827; Georgia
- Died: 1901 (aged 73–74); Tbilisi, Georgia
- Occupations: Businessman, publisher

Giorgi Kartvelishvili (Georgian: გიორგი ქართველიშვილი) (1827–1901) was a Georgian public figure, philanthropist, publisher and businessman.

Kartvelishvili owned a fishing and timber manufacturing enterprises in Georgia's Shida Kartli province and ran a sizable trading business. He built the railway from the Georgian village Ateni to the town of Gori to transport timber, part of which was used to supply the construction of the South Caucasus railway.

Being one of the most successful businessmen in Georgia at time, Kartvelishvili was best known for its philanthropic activities, mostly related to Georgian history and literature. Kartvelishvili financed the publication of the second edition of the prominent epic poem The Knight in the Panther's Skin by Shota Rustaveli (published in 1888). Earlier, in 1885, he published The History of Georgia written by Prince Vakhushti of Kartli.

During 1883–1885, Kartvelishvili was a publisher of an eminent Georgian newspaper Droeba.
