= Kvemo Achabeti =

Kvemo Achabeti Georgian: ქვემო აჩაბეთი Iron Ossetic: Дæллаг Ацабет
- Village
- Location within South Ossetia Location within Shida Kartli Location within Georgia
- Coordinates: 42°16′9″N 43°55′1″E
- Country: Georgia
- De facto state: South Ossetia (Note: South Ossetia's status is disputed. It considers itself to be an independent state, but this is recognised by only a few other countries. The Georgian government and most of the world's other states consider South Ossetia de jure a part of Georgia's territory.)
- Mkhare: Shida Kartli
- Time zone: UTC+4 (Georgian Time)

Kvemo Achabeti (Georgian: ქვემო აჩაბეთი; Iron Ossetic: Дæллаг Ацабет) is a settlement in the Tskhinvali district of South Ossetia, Georgia.

== See also ==
- Tskhinvali District
