= Guram Tskhovrebov =

Soviet footballer

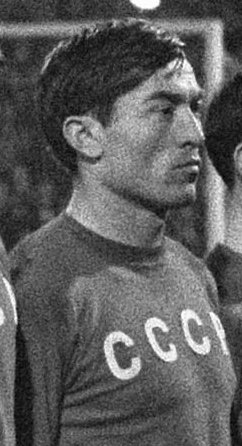

Personal information
- Full name: Guram Yasonovich Tskhovrebov
- Date of birth: 14 July 1938
- Place of birth: Tskhinvali, USSR
- Date of death: 30 November 1997 (aged 59)
- Height: 1.72 m (5 ft 8 in)
- Position: Defender

Youth career
- Soccer School Tskhinvali

Senior career*
Years	Team	Apps	(Gls)
1957–1958	Dinamo Tbilisi	0	(0)
1961–1963	Torpedo Kutaisi	57	(2)
1964–1970	Dinamo Tbilisi	151	(4)

International career
1967	USSR	7	(0)
- * Club domestic league appearances and goals

Guram Yasonovich Tskhovrebov (Georgian: გურამ ცხოვრებოვი; Russian: Гурам Ясонович Цховребов; 14 July 1938 in Tskhinvali – 1997) was a Soviet football player.

== Honours ==
- Soviet Top League winner: 1964.

== International career ==
Tskhovrebov made his debut for USSR on 28 July 1967 in a 1968 Summer Olympics qualifier against Poland. He also played in UEFA Euro 1968 qualifiers, but was not selected for the final tournament squad.
