= Machabeli =

Georgian noble house

Machabeli მაჩაბელი
- Country: Georgia

The House of Machabeli (sing. Georgian: მაჩაბელი, pl. მაჩაბლები, Machablebi; Russian: Мачабелов, romanized: Machabelov) was a Georgian princely house (tavadi) which held a large fiefdom (satavado) in the province of Inner Kartli (central Georgia) called Samachablo after their family name.

== History ==
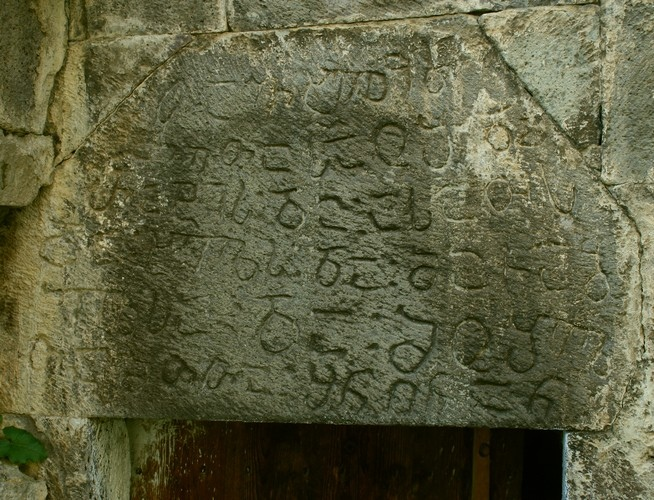
An inscription from the Tiri monastery mentioning Machabel Tavkhelidze, a purported forefather of the family.

The origin of the family is not clear. According to a traditional account, they descended from one of the princes of the Abkhaz-Georgian feudal clan of Anchabadze who had fled the disorders in Abkhazia. Another version holds it that the Machabeli were an offshoot of the Tavkhelidze family who adopted their dynastic name after the village of Achabeti on the Great Liakhvi River where their initial domain was located. Beginning with the 15th century, the Machabeli grew in prominence and held various important posts at the court of the Georgian kings of Kartli. Their fiefdom, Samachablo, covered a significant portion of what is now breakaway region of the so called "South Ossetia", and enjoyed a degree of autonomy within the Kingdom of Kartli from c. 1470 to 1800 when Georgia was annexed to Imperial Russia. The Machabeli house was confirmed in princely dignity by the Russian Tsar in 1850.

== See also ==
- Ivane Machabeli, Georgian writer, journalist and translator
- Georges V. Matchabelli, Georgian nobleman and diplomat
- Tamarasheni
- Abkhazi
