= Kvemo Monasteri =

Coordinates: 42°16′51″N 43°55′54″E

Kvemo Monasteri (Georgian: ქვემო მონასტერი; Russian: Нижний Монастер (Квемо-Монастери)) is a settlement in the Tskhinvali district of South Ossetia, Georgia.
