= Droeba =

Former newspaper in Tiflis, Georgia

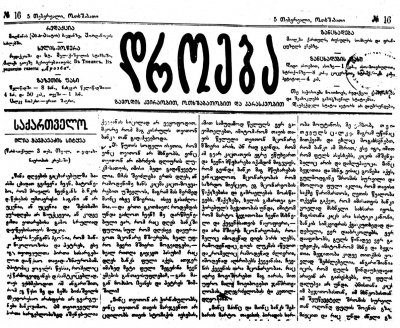
- A droeba issue with Prince Ilia Chavchavadze's article on its front page
- Native name: დროება
- Founded: 1866
- Ceased publication: 1885

Droeba (Georgian: დროება, "the Times") was an influential Georgian political and cultural newspaper published in Tiflis from 1866 to 1885.

Droeba first came out in Tiflis, the capital of the Russian Caucasus Viceroyalty, on March 4, 1866, to be published thrice weekly and then daily from 1877.

The paper was published by S. Melikishvili from 1866 to 1882 and then by Giorgi Kartvelishvili from 1882 to 1885. At various times, it was edited by leading Georgian intellectuals, including Ilia Chavchavadze and Ivane Machabeli. The newspaper, in which most major Georgian writers, journalists and social activists of that time were published, was an energetic promoter of the Georgian national idea. The younger radical Georgian literati used the pages of droeba to introduce their readers to the ideas of progressive liberal thinkers like John Stuart Mill and "utopian socialists" like Robert Owen, Saint-Simon, Charles Fourier, Pierre Proudhon, and Louis Blanc. Thus, it became more closely associated with the new generation of the Georgian national movement, known as meore dasi ("the second group") and led by Niko Nikoladze, which sought widely for a program of various forms of capitalism and Westernization. The division of the Georgian intellectuals over the issues related to financial and economical projects was also reflected on the pages of droeba. This was one reason for Ilia Chavchavadze to leave the editorial board of droeba and found his own newspaper iveria. The newspaper was closed on the order of the Russian viceroy Alexander Dondukov-Korsakov on September 16, 1885.
