= Pavlenishvili =

Old Georgian princely dynasty

Pavlenishvili ფავლენიშვილი Павле́новы
- Princely dynasty
- Coat of arms of the Pavlenishvili family
- Parent house: Mkhargrdzeli
- Country: Georgia

The House of Pavlenishvili (Georgian: ფავლენიშვილი, Russian: Павле́новы, English version Phavlenishvili, Pavlenishvili) is an old Georgian princely dynasty, branch of princes Mkhargrdzeli, who at their turn were descendants of the ancient Iranian House of Karen-Pahlevi house, a branch of the Parthian Arsacids. A version tells that the root pavleni derives from Pahlevi.

== Notable members ==
- Mikhail Pavlenishvili, poet.
