= Ivane Machabeli =

19th-century Georgian writer, journalist, and translator (1854–1898)

Tavadi Ivane Machabeli
- ივანე მაჩაბელი
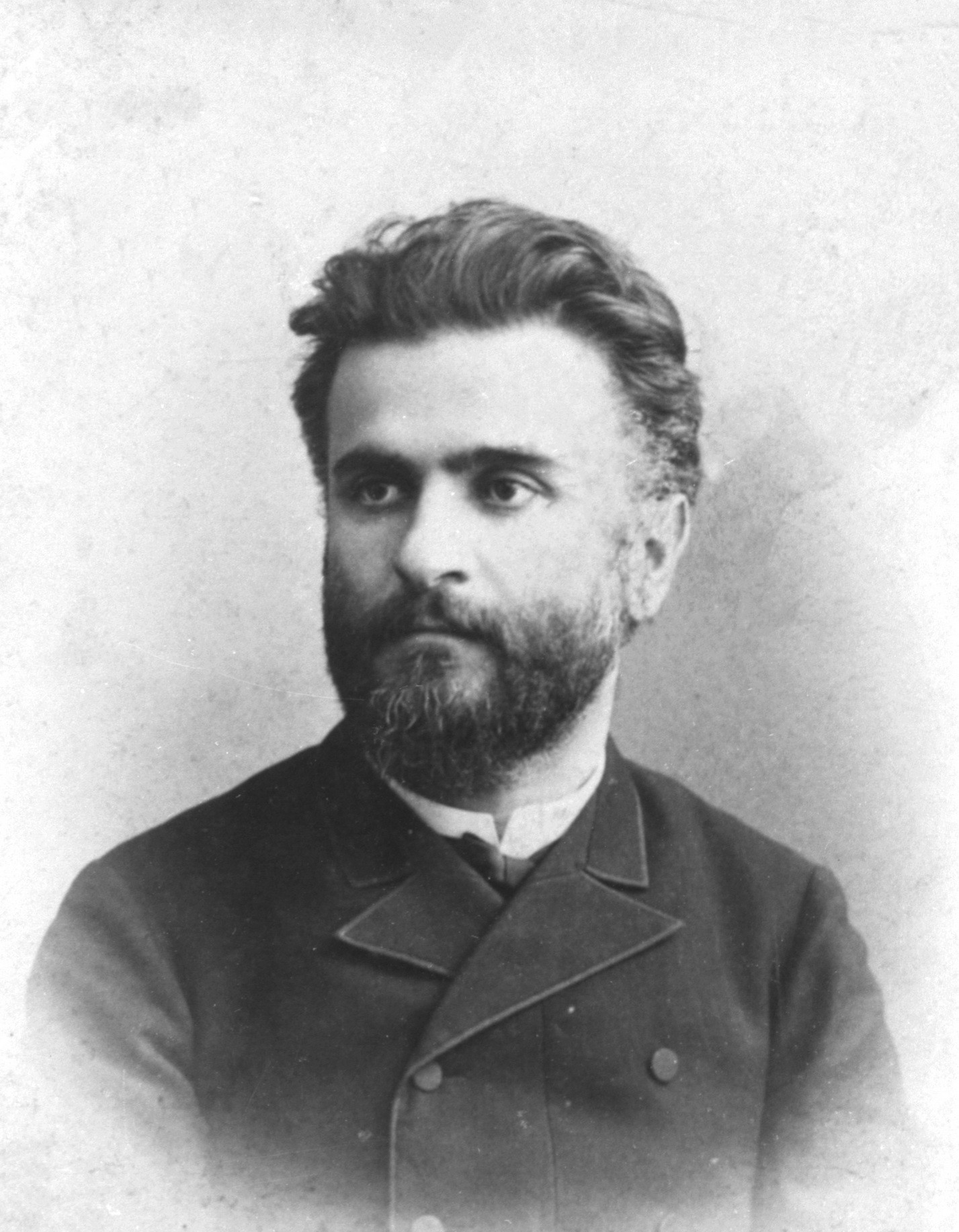
- Born: 28 January 1854; Tamarasheni
- Died: c. 1898
- Occupations: writer, translator

Prince Ivane Machabeli (Georgian: ივანე მაჩაბელი) (January 28, 1854 – c. 1898) was a Georgian writer, translator, publicist, public figure, active member of the National-Liberation Movement, and a founder of the new Georgian literary language. He is also well known for his resonant translations of Shakespeare and for writing the opera of "The Knight in the Panther's Skin."

== Biography ==
He was born into an old Georgian aristocratic family Machabeli in the village of Tamarasheni near Tskhinvali. Machabeli studied in St. Petersburg, in Germany, and in Paris. Returning in Georgia, he was closely allied with Ilia Chavchavadze, a leader of Georgian intellectual life of that time, whom Machabeli offered his assistance in all initiatives aimed at reviving Georgian culture and opposition to the Imperial Russian rule. He served an editor in chief of the leading Georgian national magazines Iveria (1882–3) and Droeba (1883–5). Despite his preoccupation with charities, especially orphanages, and extensive journalism, Machabeli made Shakespeare his life's work. Although, he never visited England, he produced, from 1886 to 1898, the brilliant translations of Hamlet, Othello, Macbeth, Richard III, Julius Caesar, Antony and Cleopatra, and Coriolanus, which to this day serve as the standard versions for the repertoire of the Rustaveli Theatre. Machabeli left his apartment in Tbilisi on June 26, 1898, and was never seen again.

The museum dedicated to Machabeli is located in his native Tamarasheni, which lies in the ongoing Georgian-Ossetian conflict zone. It was severely damaged, on July 23, 1997, in a blast allegedly organized by local Ossetian nationalists, and completely destroyed after the 2008 South Ossetia war. A street in Tbilisi's Sololaki district is named after Machabeli. This Writer's House of Georgia is located on this street.

== See also ==
- Samachablo
