= Avnevi =

Village in South Ossetia, Georgia

Coordinates: 42°11′32″N 43°52′35″E

Avnevi in Georgia
Avnevi in South Ossetia

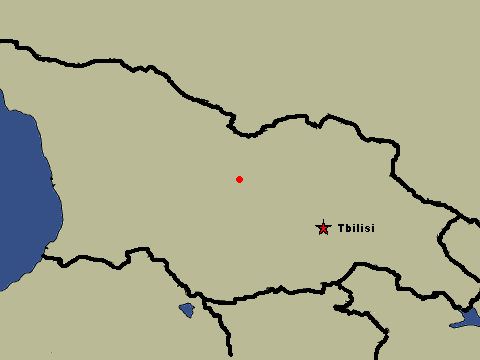
Map of Avnevi, Georgia

Avnevi (Georgian: ავნევი; Ossetian: Аунеу, Awnew) is a small village in South Ossetia, a region of Georgia whose sovereignty is disputed. Avnevi is located 873 meters above sea level and 109 kilometers from the Georgian capital of Tbilisi. Avnevi was in international news in 2008 when it was shelled during the Russia–Georgia war. In the aftermath of the war, much of the infrastructure in the town that survived the shelling was dismantled by local Ossetians trying to ensure that the displaced Georgian inhabitants did not return.

== Avnevi Church ==
Avnevi church represents architectural features and building quality of the Georgian architecture of late medieval centuries and dated back to the 14th or 15th century. It is a tiny building of cross–domed shape and triconch type, with slightly elevated sanctuary on the east and two entrances in the western arm, one on the south, another on the west.

The dome rests on the corners of the walls and has four window openings. The interior is plastered and painted in early 20th century with the simple imitation of sky and gilded stars. Exterior of the building is covered with smoothly cut stones which are placed in uneven rows. The round shape drum of the dome is built in bricks.

Windows and doors have a very simple stone moldings and a horizontal row cuts nearly all parts of the facades. There are several stone carvings and also figure relief's which are reused for the Avnevi church. One on the western façade depicts mother of God, Christ and John the Baptist, another next to south entrance depicts the Donor holding the cross and surrounded with Wood of Life. These stone reliefs are dated back to the 10th century.

Avnevi church represents a copy of 9th-century Uraveli Triconch, located in Southern part of Georgia.

== See also ==
- Znaur district
