= Gujabauri =

Gujabauri Georgian: გუჯაბაური Iron Ossetic: Гудзабар
- Village
- Location within South Ossetia Location within Shida Kartli Location within Georgia
- Coordinates: 42°12′36″N 43°58′26″E
- Country: Georgia
- De facto state: South Ossetia (Note: South Ossetia's status is disputed. It considers itself to be an independent state, but this is recognised by only a few other countries. The Georgian government and most of the world's other states consider South Ossetia de jure a part of Georgia's territory.)
- Mkhare: Shida Kartli
- Time zone: UTC+4 (Georgian Time)

Gujabauri (Georgian: გუჯაბაური, Iron Ossetic: Гудзабар) is a settlement in the Tskhinvali district of South Ossetia, Georgia.

== See also ==
- Tskhinvali District
