= Tsirkoli church of the Mother of God =

- Tsirkoli church of the Mother of God

- Location within Georgia

Location
- Location: Tsirkoli, South Ossetia/Mtskheta-Mtianeti, Georgia
- Coordinates: 42.170989°N 44.474621°E

The Tsirkoli church of the Mother of God (Georgian: წირქოლის ღვთისმშობლის ეკლესია, romanized: ts'irkolis ghvtismshoblis ek'lesia) is an 8th–9th-century Georgian Orthodox church near the village of Tsirkoli in the Ksani river valley. It combines the features of domeless and domed church designs and is classified as belonging to the "transitional period" of medieval Georgian architecture. The area, part of the Akhalgori Municipality, came under the control of Russian and South Ossetian forces in the August 2008 Russo-Georgian War. As a result, the Georgian clergy and parish lost access to the church, which is inscribed on Georgia's Immovable Cultural Monuments of National Significance.

== Location ==
The Tsirkoli church of the Mother of God stands northwest of the village of Tsirkoli, on the right bank of the Ksani River. The village, also known as Tsirkvali in historical records, is first mentioned in the medieval Georgian chronicles when relating the events in 975. It is home to another, late medieval church of St. George and a ruined fortress, located nearby.

== Layout ==
The church of the Mother of God is built of porous tuff. It has the centrally located dome, which is without a drum, rests on squinches, and is vaulted with a gable roof, imparting an outward appearance of a single-nave building. At the east end of the interior there is a sanctuary, with a semicircular apse and side chambers. The west part of the interior is two-storeyed, each floor connected to the central square bay through a pair of arched openings. The east façade has a pediment, crowned by a simple cornice. Between the pediment and a double-arched window below it there is a large rectangular recess, probably made to accommodate an inscription—a project that did not materialize. In the centre of the south façade there are three interconnected arched niches surmounted by a double window, which is adorned with exquisite stone carvings. The central niche serves as a doorway into the building. A stone inscription from the church, made in the medieval Georgian asomtavruli script and mentioning King Leon III of Abkhazia, is dated to the period of 957–967 and is preserved at the Georgian National Museum in Tbilisi. The layout of the dome and east façade are unusual in the medieval Georgian church architecture.

The interior bears fragments of the 10th–11th-century frescoes. Better preserved are the depictions of the saints Febronia and Marianus, with identifying Georgian inscriptions, in the central bay. Also, there are about a dozen scratched graffiti in the church, paleographically dated from the 14th century to the 17th, commemorative or left by pilgrims.

== Current status ==
The Tsirkoli church of the Mother of God, significantly damaged by an earthquake, was substantially repaired by the Georgian government between 2006 and 2008. After the Russo-Georgian War of August 2008, the Georgians could no more operate the church. In August 2009, Georgia accused Russia of putting the historical monuments of Tsirkoli at a risk due to new military installations in the area.
