= Zemo Achabeti =

Zemo Achabeti Georgian: ზემო აჩაბეთი Iron Ossetic: Уæллаг Ацабет
- Village
- Location within South Ossetia Location within Shida Kartli Location within Georgia
- Coordinates: 42°16′41″N 43°57′24″E
- Country: Georgia
- De facto state: South Ossetia (Note: South Ossetia's status is disputed. It considers itself to be an independent state, but this is recognised by only a few other countries. The Georgian government and most of the world's other states consider South Ossetia de jure a part of Georgia's territory.)
- Time zone: UTC+4 (Georgian Time)

Zemo Achabeti (Georgian: ზემო აჩაბეთი) is a settlement in the Tskhinvali district of South Ossetia, a region of Georgia whose sovereignty is disputed.

== See also ==
- Tskhinvali district
- Provisional Administration of South Ossetia
