= Samachablo =

Samachablo სამაჩაბლო
- Historical region
- Location within South Ossetia Location within Georgia
- Coordinates: 42°13′35″N 43°58′10″E; An approximate geographical area.
- Country: Georgia
- Mkhare: Shida Kartli
- Capital: Tbilisi

Samachablo (Georgian: სამაჩაბლო [ˈsämät͡ʃʰäbɫo̞]) is a Georgian historical district in Shida Kartli, Georgia, which has been occupied in 2008 by Russia, lies entirely within the disputed Tskhinvali Region (controlled by the partially recognised Republic of South Ossetia). The name Samachablo (literally, "of Machabeli") derives from the Georgian aristocratic family of Machabeli who once held possession of the area. With the rise of Georgian-Ossetian interethnic tensions in the late 1980s, the name was revived by the Georgians and has sometimes been semi-officially used since then.

Although the territory is officially referred to as Tskhinvali region by Georgian authorities after the name of its only city, the term has become dominant among the Georgian public, in particular following the 2008 Russo-Georgian War.

The term is considered offensive by South Ossetian separatists.

== See also ==
- Georges V. Matchabelli
- Ivane Machabeli
