= Keli Lake =

Volcanic-glacial lake in Georgia

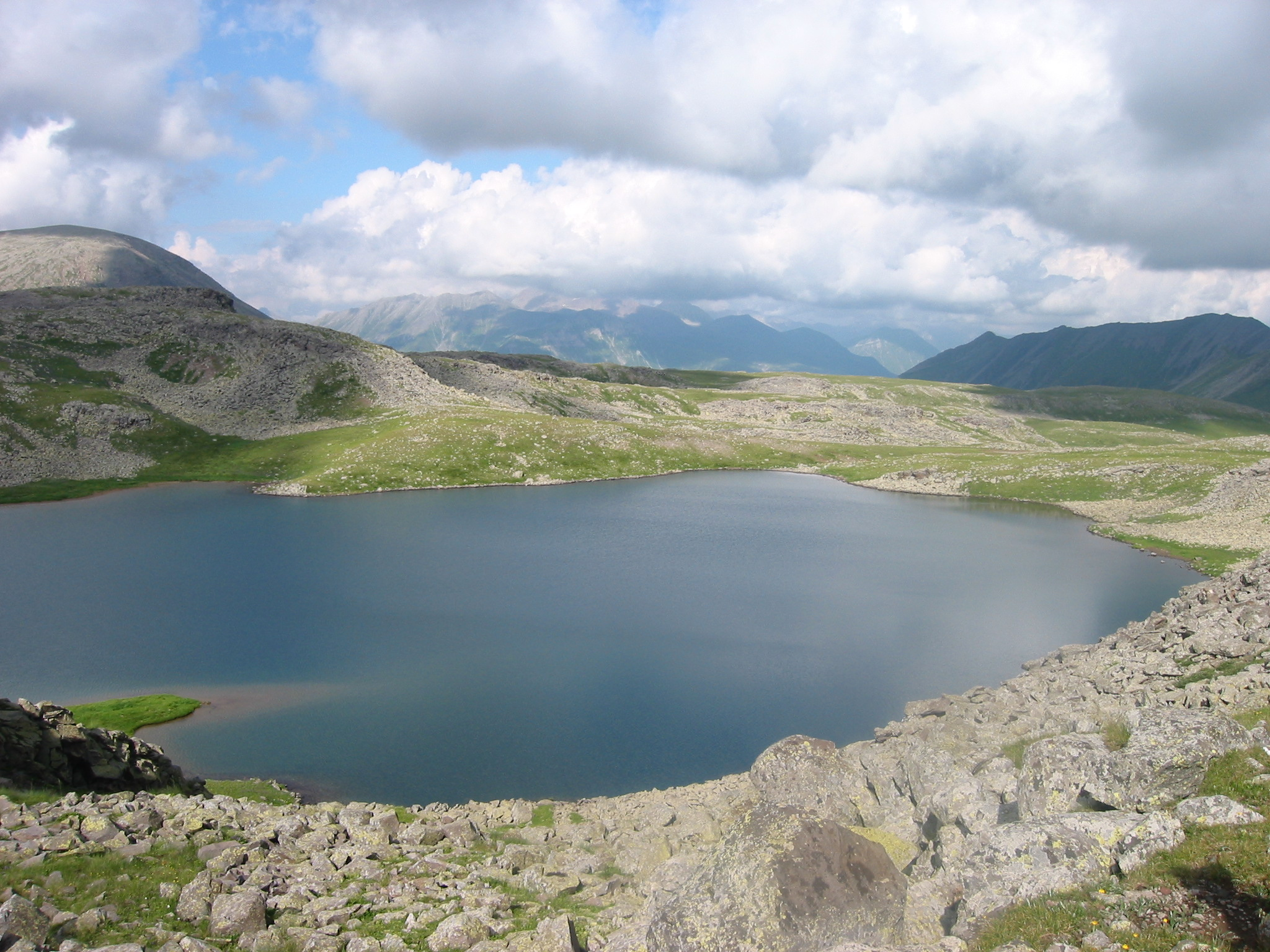
- Keli Lake

- Location within Georgia Location within Mtskheta-Mtianeti
- Coordinates: 42°28′47″N 44°18′54″E
- Catchment area: 7.8 km^{2} (3.0 sq mi)
- Basin countries: Georgia
- Surface area: 1.28 km^{2} (0.49 sq mi)
- Average depth: 24.7 m (81 ft)
- Max. depth: 63 m (207 ft)
- Water volume: 31.6 million cubic metres (1.12×10^{9} cu ft)
- Surface elevation: 2,914 m (9,560 ft)

Keli Lake (Georgian: ყელის ტბა; Iron Ossetic: Хъелы цад, Qely cad) is a volcanic-glacial lake in the Akhalgori Municipality, Mtskheta-Mtianeti region of Georgia. Located in Caucasus Mountains, in Keli Highland, at 2914 m above sea level. Stuck between Kharuli and Alevi ranges. The area of surface is 1.28 km^{2}, while the catchment area is 7.8 km^{2}. Average depth is 24,7 m, maximal depth is 63 m. Gets its feed from snow, rainfall and underground waters. River Ksani outflows from the Lake. Its water is clear.
