= Little Liakhvi =

River in Georgia

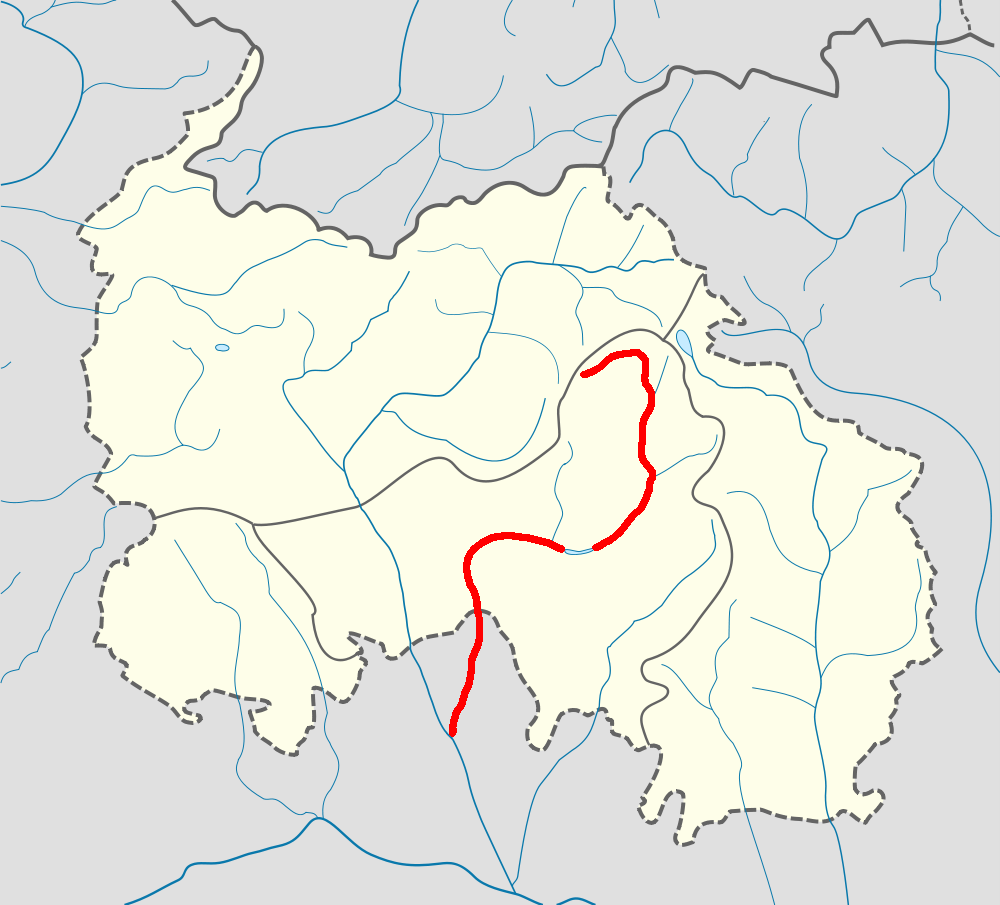
- Location on map of South Ossetia
- Native name: პატარა ლიახვი (Georgian)

Location
- Country: Georgia (South Ossetia)

Physical characteristics
- Mouth: Great Liakhvi
  - coordinates: 42.1108°N 44.0332°E
- Length: 63 km (39 mi)
- Basin size: 513 km^{2} (198 sq mi)

Basin features
- Progression: Great Liakhvi→ Kura→ Caspian Sea

The Little Liakhvi (Georgian: პატარა ლიახვი p'at'ara liakhvi) is a river of Georgia. It is 63 km (39 mi) long, and has a drainage basin of 513 km^{2} (198 sq mi). It is a left-bank tributary of the Great Liakhvi, which it joins near the village Shindisi.
