= Znaur District =

Znaur District ყორნისის მუნიციპალიტეტი Знауыры район
- District
- Location of Znaur District in South Ossetia
- Coordinates: 42.2500°N 43.7500°E
- Country: Georgia
- De facto state: South Ossetia
- Capital: Znauri

Government
  - Head of administration: Zaur Tskhobrebov
  - Votes in Parliament: (of 69)

Area
  - Total: 404 km^{2} (156 sq mi)

Population (1998)
  - Total: 9,000
  - Density: 22/km^{2} (58/sq mi)
- Time zone: UTC+03:00 (MSK)

Znaur District (Georgian: ყორნისის მუნიციპალიტეტი, Qornisis municip’alit’et’i; Iron Ossetic: Знауыры район, Znauyry rajon; Russian: Знаурский район, Znaurskiy rayon) is one of the districts of South Ossetia. It is located in the southwestern part of South Ossetia. Znauri is the administrative center of the district.

== International status ==
According to administrative division of Georgia, its territory is part of Kareli Municipality of Shida Kartli.
