= Tighva municipality =

Administrative unit in South Ossetia

Tighva Municipality თიღვის მუნიციპალიტეტი
- Municipality
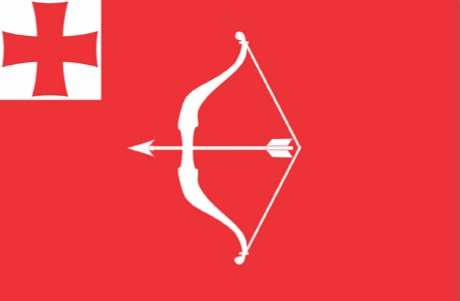
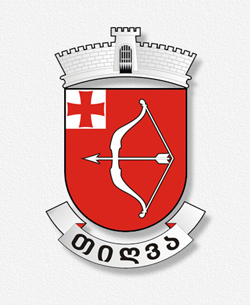
- Flag Coat of arms

- Country: Georgia
- Region: Shida Kartli
- Established: 6 December 2006
- Capital: Avnevi

Area
  - Total: 404 km^{2} (156 sq mi)

Population (2008)
  - Total: 1,300
  - Density: 3.2/km^{2} (8.3/sq mi)
- Time zone: UTC+4

Tighva Municipality (Georgian: სსიპ თიღვის მუნიციპალიტეტი) is a temporary administrative-territorial unit in Georgia, currently under the control of the separatist Republic of South Ossetia. Its municipal authorities are located in Tbilisi. The municipality was formed in 2006, comprising 1 town and 24 villages and divided into 6 administrative units (Akhalshen, Tighva, Okona, Lopan, Avnevi, Nuli). The center of the municipality is the village of Avnevi.

== Local self-government ==
1. Administrative unit of Akhalshen - Akhalshen, Borsiaani, Tereghvani, Nedlati, Khundisubani.
2. Administrative unit of Tighva - village, Alibari, Znauri, Tighva, Nabakevi, Shindara.
3. Administrative unit of Okona - Zemo Okona, Mughrisi, Sunisi, Tkyisubani, Kvemo Okona.
4. Administrative unit of Lopan - Balta, Giorgitsminda, Lopan, Patkineti, Kaleti, Tsnelisi.
5. Administrative unit of Avnevi - Avnevi, Dzvileti.
6. Administrative unit of Nuli - Arkneti, Nuli.
