= Great Liakhvi =

River in Georgia

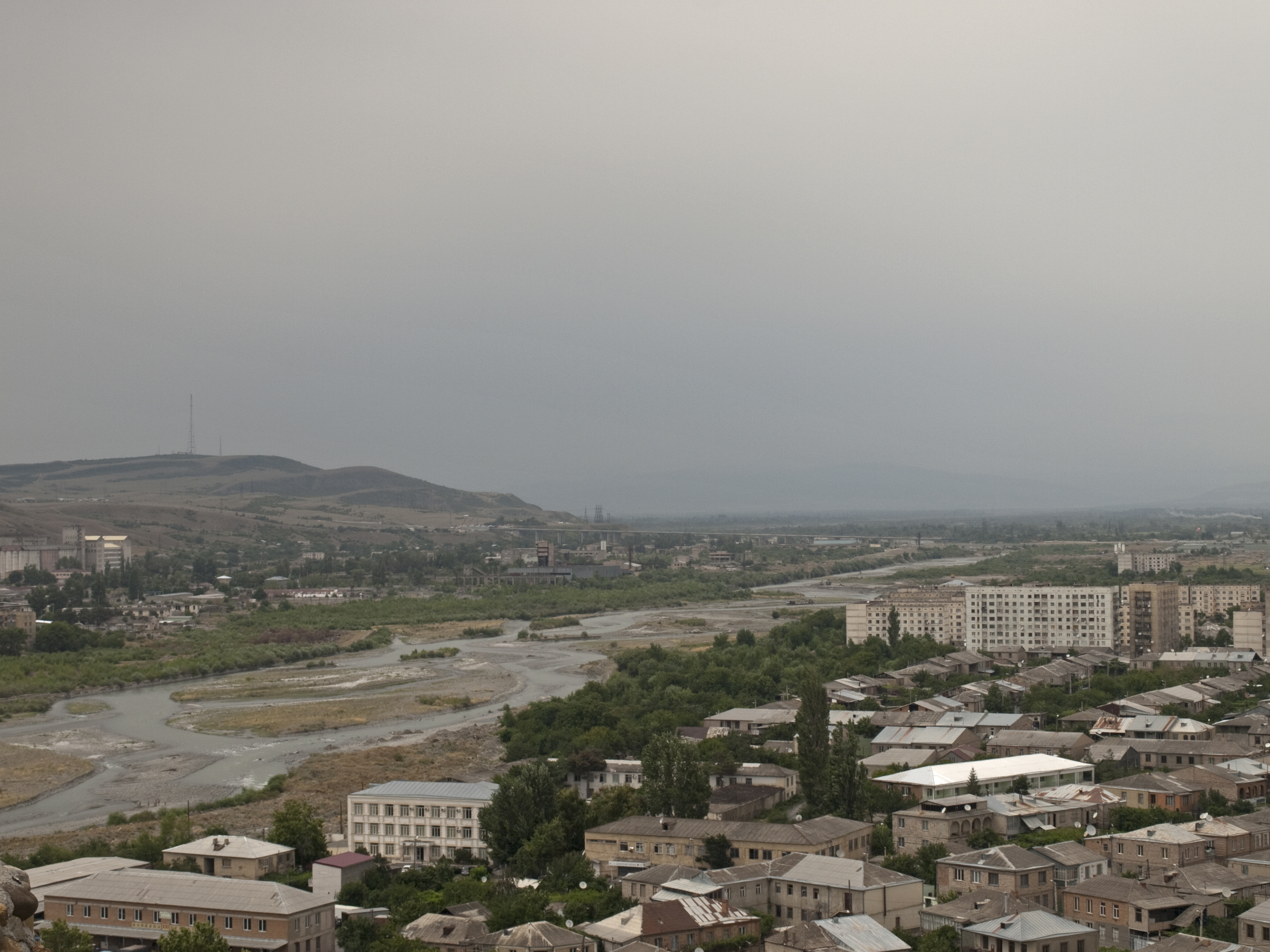
- Great Liakhvi in Gori
- Native name: ლიახვი (Georgian)

Location
- Country: Georgia (South Ossetia)

Physical characteristics
- Mouth: Kura (Mtkvari)
  - coordinates: 41°58′23″N 44°06′29″E
- Length: 115 km (71 mi)
- Basin size: 2,311 km^{2} (892 sq mi)

Basin features
- Progression: Kura→ Caspian Sea
- Tributaries
  - left: Little Liakhvi

Liakhvi River basin

The Great Liakhvi (Georgian: დიდი ლიახვი Didi Liakhvi [ˈd̪id̪i ˈliäχʷi], Iron Ossetic: Стыр Леуахи, Styr Lewakhi) is a river in central Georgia, which rises on the southern slopes of the Greater Caucasus Mountain Range, in the disputed Georgian territory of South Ossetia, primarily in the Tskhinvali Raion, and flows into the Kura (Mtkvari). It is 115 km (71 mi) long, and has a drainage basin of 2,311 km^{2} (892 sq mi). The river runs from the Georgian-Russian border down to Gori, a city in Shida Kartli. The cities of Tskhinvali and Gori lie along the banks of the Great Liakhvi. The river is mainly fed by the melting snows and glacier runoff of the Caucasus Mountains as well as by underground water sources. The Liakhvi reaches its highest water volume in the spring and summer while the lowest volume is recorded in the winter, when some segments of the river freeze over.

The Little Liakhvi is a left-bank tributary.
