= Kornisi =

Kornisi / Znaur
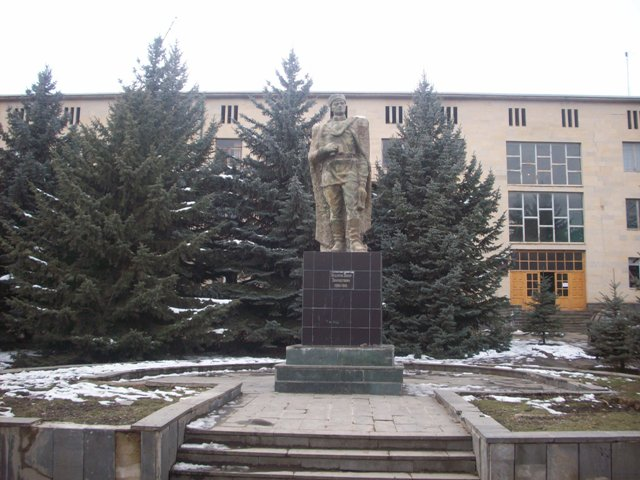
- Monument to Znaur Aidarov

- Location in Georgia Kornisi / Znaur (Shida Kartli) Kornisi / Znaur (Georgia)
- Coordinates: 42°11′39″N 43°46′18″E
- Country: Georgia
- De facto state: South Ossetia
- Mkhare: Shida Kartli

Population
  - Total: 415

Kornisi (Georgian: ყორნისი, Q'ornisi) or Znaur (Ossetic: Знауыр, Znawyr) is a rural locality in the South Caucasus, claimed by Georgia. The Georgian government recognizes Kornisi as daba in Kareli Municipality of Shida Kartli region.
