= Tskhinvali =

Disputed city in Georgia or South Ossetia

Tskhinvali ცხინვალი (Georgian) Цхинвал, Чъреба (Iron Ossetic)
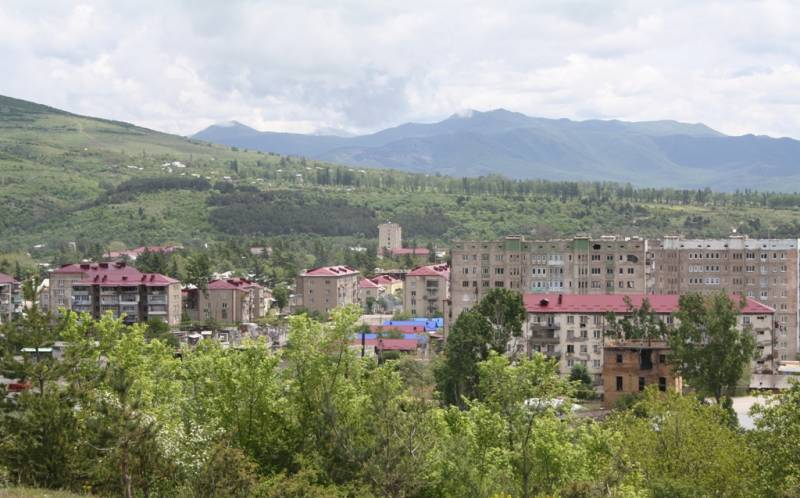
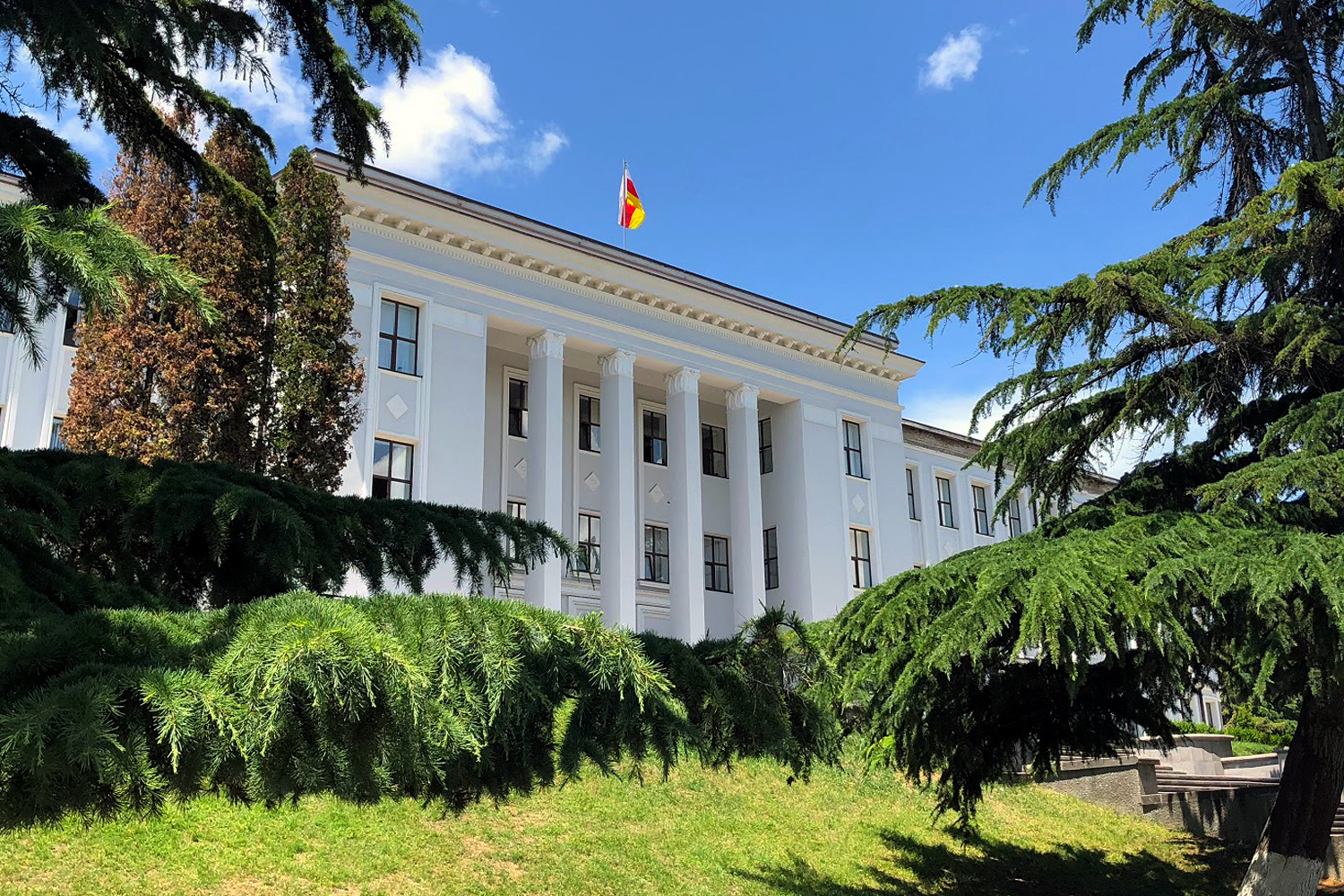
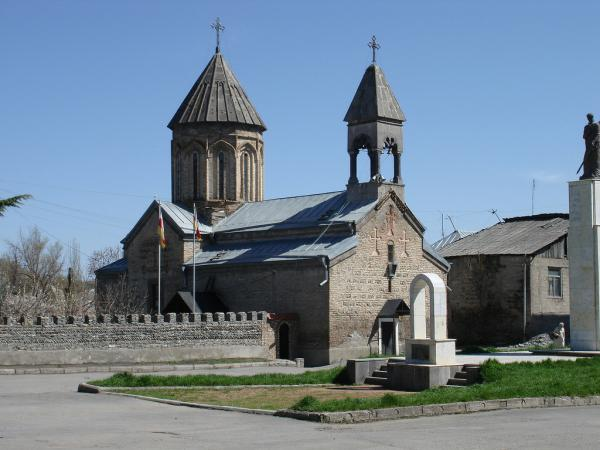
- From the top, left to right, View over Tskhinvali, Parliament Building, St. Astvatsatsin Church

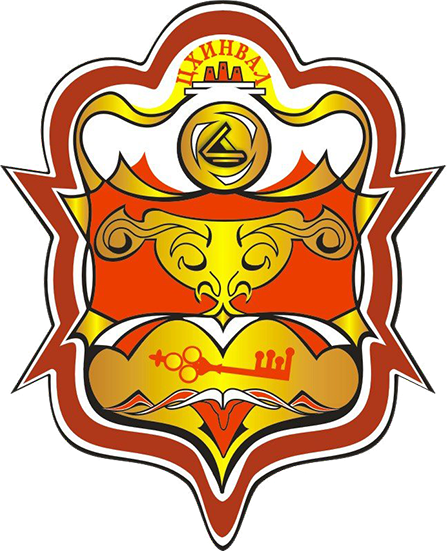
- Flag Coat of arms
- Interactive map of Tskhinvali
- Location within Georgia Location within Shida Kartli Location within South Ossetia
- Coordinates: 42°13′30″N 43°58′12″E
- Country: Georgia (de jure); South Ossetia (de facto)
- Mkhare: Shida Kartli
- District: Tskhinvali
- Established: 1398

Government
  - Head of Administration: Alan Gabaraev

Area
  - Total: 17.46 km^{2} (6.74 sq mi)
- Elevation: 860 m (2,820 ft)

Population (1 January 2019)
  - Total: 32,180
  - Density: 1,843/km^{2} (4,774/sq mi)
- Time zone: UTC+3 (Moscow time)
- Climate: Dfb
- Website: https://www.tskhinval.ru/

Tskhinvali (Note: Georgian: ცხინვალი, pronounced [t͡sʰχinʷali]; Russian: Цхинвали, romanized: Chinvali, pronounced [tsxʲɪnˈvalʲɪ]) or Tskhinval, (Note: Iron Ossetic: Цхинвал / Чъреба, romanized: Cxinval / Čhreba, pronounced [t͡sχiɱˈvaɫ / ˈt͡ʃʼrʲeba]; Russian: Цхинвал, romanized: Chinval, pronounced [tsxʲɪnˈvaɫ]) occasionally called Stalinir during specific contexts, is the capital of the disputed de facto independent Republic of South Ossetia, internationally considered part of Shida Kartli, Georgia (except by Russia and three other UN member states). Tskhinvali Region was also known historically as Samachablo by Georgians. It is located on the Great Liakhvi River approximately 100 kilometres (62 mi) northwest of the Georgian capital Tbilisi.

== Name ==
The name of Tskhinvali is derived from the Old Georgian Krtskhinvali (Georgian: ქრცხინვალი), from earlier Krtskhilvani (Georgian: ქრცხილვანი), literally meaning "the land of hornbeams", which is the historical name of the city. See ცხინვალი for more.

From 1934 to 1961, the city was named Staliniri (Georgian: სტალინირი, Iron Ossetic: Сталинир), which was a compilation of Joseph Stalin's surname with Ossetian word "Ir" which means Ossetia. Modern Ossetians call the city Tskhinval (leaving off the final "i", which is a nominative case ending in Georgian); the other Ossetian name of the city is Chreba (Iron Ossetic: Чъреба) which is only spread as a colloquial word. The name Chreba comes from the Georgian Ḳreba (Georgian: კრება), literally meaning "gathering" due to the city historically serving as a trading point.

== History ==
Humans first settled in the area around present-day Tskhinvali in the Bronze Age. The unearthed settlements and archaeological artifacts from that time are unique in that they reflect influences from both Iberian (east Georgia) and Colchian (west Georgia) cultures with possible Sarmatian elements.

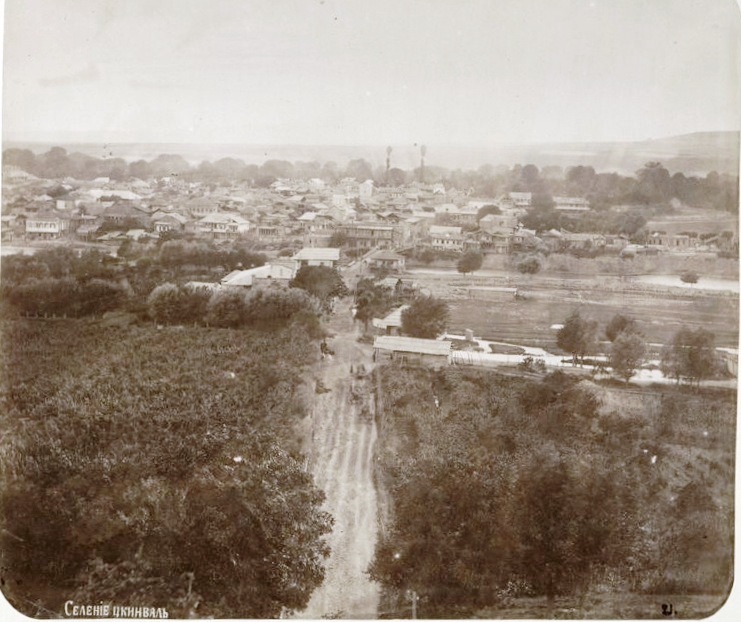
A vintage photo of Tskhinvali by D. Rudnev, 1886

Tskhinvali was first chronicled by Georgian sources in 1398 as a village in Kartli (central Georgia), though a later account credits the 3rd-century AD Georgian king Aspacures II of Iberia with its foundation as a fortress. By the early-18th century, Tskhinvali was a small "royal town" populated chiefly by monastic serfs. Tskhinvali was annexed to the Russian Empire along with the rest of eastern Georgia in 1801. Located on a trade route which linked North Caucasus to Tbilisi and Gori, Tskhinvali gradually developed into a commercial town with a mixed Georgian Jewish, Georgian, Armenian and Ossetian population. In 1917, it had 600 households with 38.4% occupied by Georgian Jews, 34.4% by Georgians, 17.7% by Armenians and 8.8% by Ossetians.

The town saw clashes between the Georgian People's Guard and pro-Bolshevik Ossetian peasants during the 1918–20 period, when Georgia gained brief independence from Russia. Soviet rule was established by the invading Red Army in March 1921, and a year later, in 1922, Tskhinvali was made a capital of the South Ossetian Autonomous Oblast within the Georgian SSR. Subsequently, the town became largely Ossetian due to intense urbanization and to the Soviet korenizatsiya ("nativization") policy which induced an inflow of Ossetians from nearby rural areas into Tskhinvali. The settlement was essentially an industrial centre, with lumber mills and manufacturing plants, and also had several cultural and educational institutions such as a venerated Pedagogical Institute (currently Tskhinvali State University) and a drama theatre. According to the last Soviet census (in 1989), Tskhinvali had a population of 42,934, and according to the census of Republic of South Ossetia in 2015, the population comprised 30,432 people.

During the acute phase of the Georgian-Ossetian conflict of 1989 and following, Tskhinvali was a scene of ethnic tensions and ensuing armed confrontation between Georgian and Ossetian forces. The 1992 Sochi ceasefire accord left Tskhinvali in the hands of Ossetians.

=== Russo-Georgian War ===
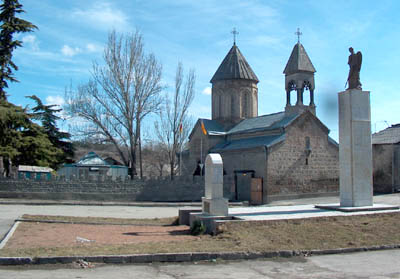
The monument to the victims of the Georgian-Ossetian conflict near the Armenian church in Tskhinvali

A considerable part of the population of South Ossetia (at least 30,000 out of 70,000) fled into North Ossetia–Alania prior or immediately after the start of the Russo-Georgian War in August 2008. However, many civilians were killed during the shelling and the following Battle of Tskhinvali of 8 to 11 August 2008 (162 civilian deaths were documented by the Russian team of investigators and 365 by the South Ossetian authorities). The town was heavily damaged during the battle due to extensive shelling by the Georgian Army. Andrey Illarionov visited the town in October 2008 and reported that the Jewish Quarter was in ruins, though he observed that the ruins were overgrown with shrubs and trees, which indicates that the destruction took place during the 1991–1992 South Ossetia War. However, Mark Ames, who was covering the last war for The Nation, stated that both Tskhinvali's main residential district, nicknamed "Shanghai" because of its population density (where most of the city's high-rise apartment blocks are located), and the old Jewish Quarter, were completely destroyed.

== Geography ==
=== Climate ===
Located in the Caucasus, at 860 metres (2,820 ft) above sea level, Tskhinvali has a humid continental climate (Köppen: Dfb), with an average annual precipitation of 805 millimetres (31.7 in). Summers are mild and winters are cold, with snowfalls.

Climate data for Tskhinvali
Month	Jan	Feb	Mar	Apr	May	Jun	Jul	Aug	Sep	Oct	Nov	Dec	Year
Mean daily maximum °C (°F)	1.9 (35.4)	3.3 (37.9)	7.8 (46.0)	14.2 (57.6)	19.5 (67.1)	22.8 (73.0)	25.2 (77.4)	25.4 (77.7)	21.2 (70.2)	15.8 (60.4)	8.7 (47.7)	4.0 (39.2)	14.2 (57.5)
Daily mean °C (°F)	−2.6 (27.3)	−1.4 (29.5)	2.8 (37.0)	8.1 (46.6)	13.3 (55.9)	16.6 (61.9)	19.1 (66.4)	19.2 (66.6)	14.9 (58.8)	9.9 (49.8)	4.1 (39.4)	−0.4 (31.3)	8.6 (47.5)
Mean daily minimum °C (°F)	−7.1 (19.2)	−6.0 (21.2)	−2.2 (28.0)	2.0 (35.6)	7.2 (45.0)	10.4 (50.7)	13.1 (55.6)	13.0 (55.4)	8.6 (47.5)	4.1 (39.4)	0.5 (32.9)	−4.7 (23.5)	3.2 (37.8)
Average precipitation mm (inches)	46 (1.8)	46 (1.8)	52 (2.0)	74 (2.9)	97 (3.8)	97 (3.8)	75 (3.0)	66 (2.6)	60 (2.4)	68 (2.7)	65 (2.6)	59 (2.3)	805 (31.7)
Source: Climate-data.org

== Present ==
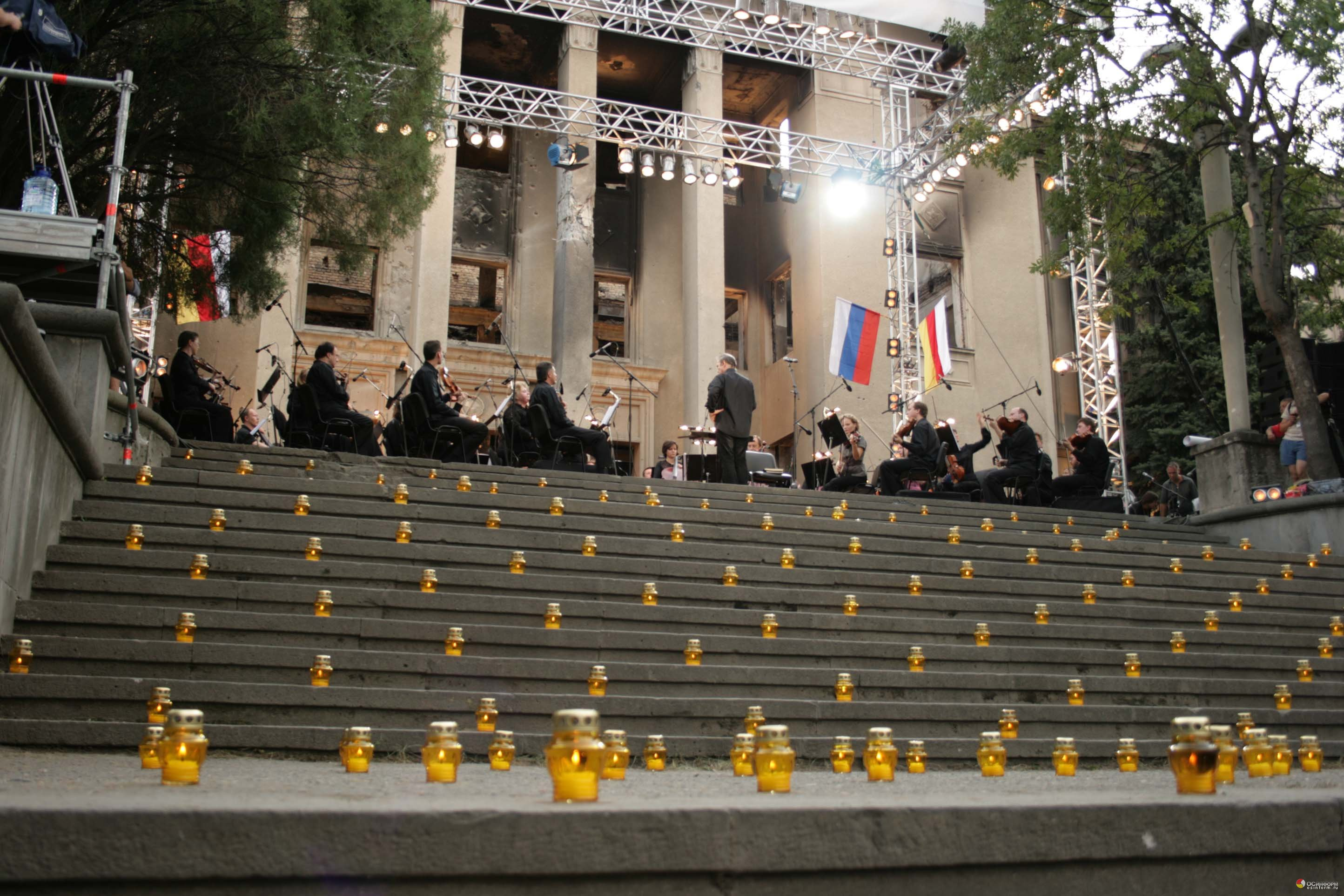
21 August 2008. Valery Gergiev with Mariinsky Theatre opera in Tskhinvali.

Currently, Tskhinvali functions as the capital of South Ossetia. Before the 2008 war it had a population of approximately 30,000. The town remained significantly impoverished in the absence of a permanent political settlement between the two sides in the past two decades.

On 21 August 2008, Valery Gergiev, a conductor and director of the Mariinsky Theatre of Ossetian origin, conducted a concert near the ruined building of South Ossetian parliament in memory of the Ossetian victims of the Russo-Georgian War.

The Current head of Administration is Alan Gabaraev.

== Transport ==
There was a railway service before 1991 at the Tskhinvali Railway station connecting the city with Gori.

== International relations ==
=== Twin towns and Sister cities ===
Tskhinvali is twinned with the following cities:

- Arkhangelsk, Russia
- Vladivostok, Russia
- Cherkessk, Russia

== Notable people ==
- David Baazov, founder of the Zionist movement in Georgia
- Anatoly Bibilov, 4th President of South Ossetia
- Lyudvig Chibirov, First President of South Ossetia
- Alan Gagelov, 5th President of South Ossetia
- Kakhi Kakhiashvili, Olympic Champion weightlifter
- Arsen Kasabiev, weightlifter
- Eduard Kokoity, Second President of South Ossetia
- Yuri Kokoyev, footballer
- Vadim Laliev, former professional wrestler representing Armenia and Russia
- Irakli Okruashvili, a Georgian politician and a former Georgian Defence Minister
- Temo Svirely, artist
- Guram Tskhovrebov, football player

== See also ==
- Shida Kartli
- Samachablo
