= Tskhinvali District =

Tskhinvali District ცხინვალის მუნიციპალიტეტი Цхинвалы район
- District in South Ossetia
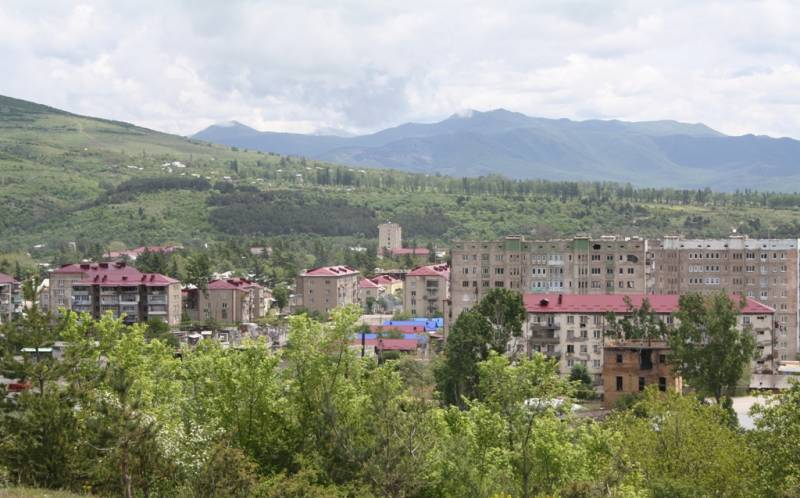
- Tskhinvali City

- Location of Tskhinvali District in South Ossetia

- Location within South Ossetia Location within Shida Kartli Location within Georgia
- Coordinates: 42°15′00″N 44°10′00″E
- Country: Georgia
- De facto state: South Ossetia (Note: South Ossetia's status is disputed. It considers itself to be an independent state, but this is recognised by only a few other countries. The Georgian government and most of the world's other states consider South Ossetia de jure a part of Georgia's territory.)
- Capital: Tskhinvali

Government
  - Head of administration: Inal Pukhayev
  - Votes in Parliament: (of 69)

Area
  - Total: 695 km^{2} (268 sq mi)

Population
  - Total: 18,000
  - Density: 26/km^{2} (67/sq mi)
- Time zone: UTC+03:00 (MSK)

Tskhinvali District (Georgian: ცხინვალის მუნიციპალიტეტი; Iron Ossetic: Цхинвалы район) is a district of South Ossetia. The district consists of the lower part of Greater Liakhvi valley, where Tskhinvali itself is located, and of the less-populated valleys of Smaller Liakhvi and Mejuda rivers.

== History ==
The area around the present-day Tskhinvali was first populated back in the Bronze Age. The unearthed settlements and archaeological artifacts from that time are unique in that they reflect influences from both Iberian (east Georgia) and Colchian (west Georgia) cultures with possible Sarmatian elements.

Tskhinvali was first chronicled by Georgian sources in 1398 as a village in Kartli (central Georgia) though a later account credits the 3rd century AD Georgian king Asphagur of Iberia with its foundation as a fortress. By the early 18th century, Tskhinvali was a small "royal town" populated chiefly by monastic serfs. Tskhinvali was annexed to the Russian Empire along with the rest of eastern Georgia in 1801. Located on a trade route which linked North Caucasus to Tbilisi and Gori, Tskhinvali gradually developed into a commercial town with a mixed Jewish, Georgian, Armenian and Ossetian population. In the 1917 it had 600 houses with 38.4% Jews, 34.4% Georgians, 17.7% Armenians and 8.8% Ossetians.
