= Vyacheslav Borisov =

Russian major general (1955–2021)

- Вячеслав Николаевич Борисов
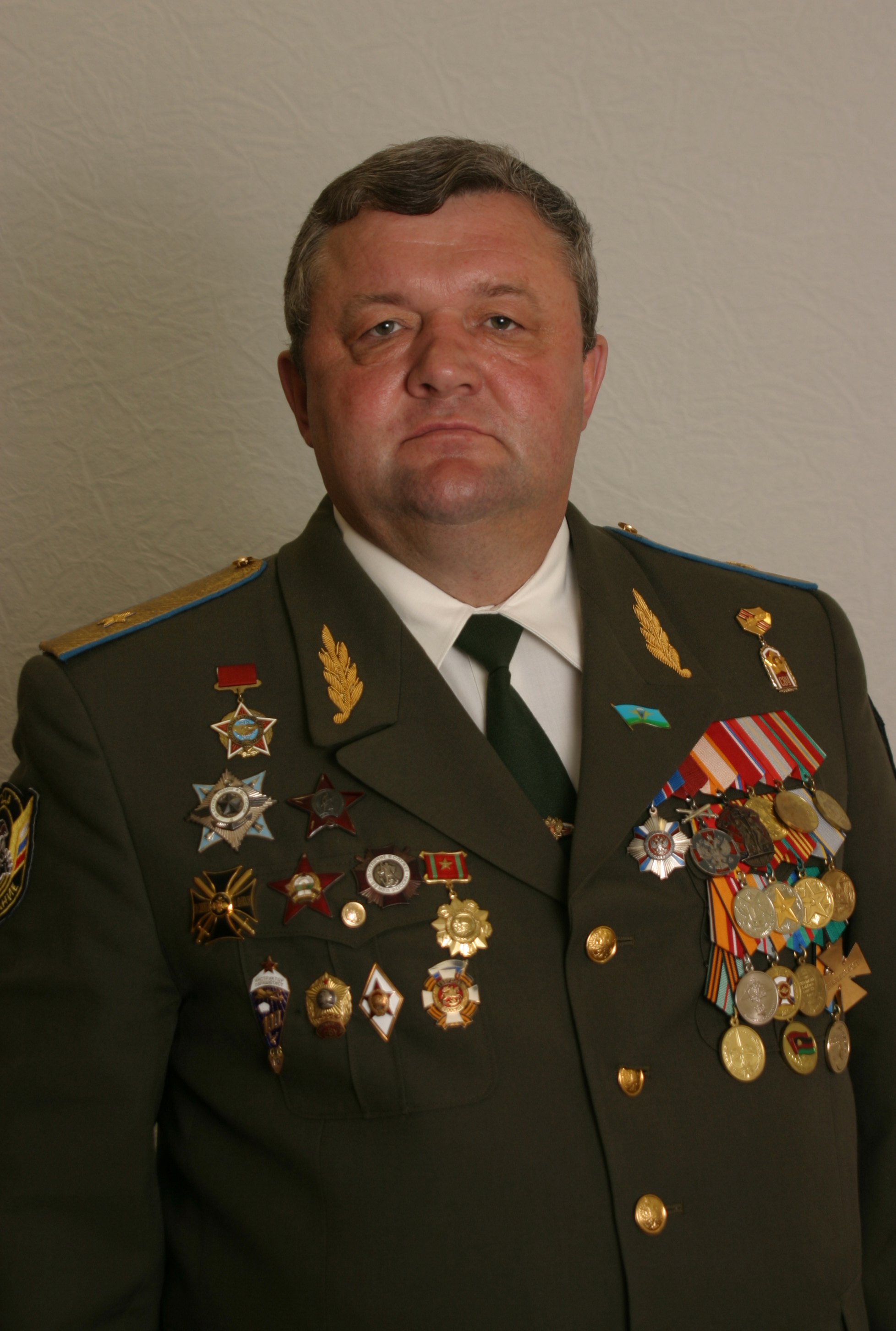
- Borisov in 2006
- Born: 12 January 1955; Ruza, Moscow Oblast, Russian SFSR, Soviet Union (now Russia)
- Died: 4 November 2021 (aged 66); Moscow, Russia
- Military career
- Allegiance: Soviet Union; Russia
- Branch: Russian Airborne Forces
- Rank: Major general
- Commands: 76th Airborne Division; Russian forces in Gori
- Conflicts: Soviet–Afghan War; Second Chechen War; Russo-Georgian War; Occupation of Gori

Vyacheslav Nikolayevich Borisov (Russian: Вячеслав Николаевич Борисов; 12 January 1955 – 4 November 2021) was a Russian major general. He took part in the 2008 Russo-Georgian War as a commanding officer in South Ossetia. The International Criminal Court (ICC) collected evidence against Borisov, who, according to a ICC prosecutor, was "believed to have intentionally contributed to the execution" of war crimes against Georgian civilians, but Borisov died before the ICC investigation was concluded.

== Early life and career ==
Borisov was born in Ruza, near Moscow, during the rule of the Soviet Union. He graduated from the Sverdlovsk Suvorov Military School. He joined the Soviet Military in 1976, when he graduated from the Ryazan Higher Airborne College and was commissioned into the airborne forces. A good officer, he rose through the ranks and in 1990 he graduated from the M. V. Frunze Military Academy. From 1991 to 1995, he was commander of the 11th Separate Airborne Brigade in Ulan-Ude, the Transbaikal Military District. Later after promotion to General officer rank, he commanded the 2nd Guards Tamanskaya Motor Rifle Division of the Russian Ground Forces in the Moscow Military District from 1995 to 1996.

== Commands in Georgia ==
In 1998, he graduated from the General Staff Academy and was appointed the commander of the 12th Russian Military Base in Batumi, Georgia's Autonomous Republic of Adjara. In 2003, he became Deputy Commander for Airborne Training.

== 2008 Russo-Georgian War ==
The 76th Airborne Division was sent from its garrison in Pskov to reinforce 58th Army, and took part in the Battle of Tskhinvali. After the successful conclusion of the battle, the force moved further and occupied Gori. He was the commander of Russian military forces during the occupation of Gori. In the absence of civilian government, he was the de facto governor in the region.

On 6 June 2009, Borisov in an interview with Moscow-based radio Ekho Moskvy said that the reason why his division performed well in the 2008 Russo-Georgian War was that "a week before the war they held military exercises exactly there, in those places". In December 2022, the International Criminal Court investigation uncovered Borisov's role in war crimes committed during the hostilities, but no warrant was issued as he had died in November 2021.

== Personal life ==
General Borisov was married and had two sons. He was also a Christian.

=== Military medals and ribbons ===
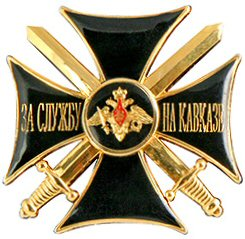
| Order of Military Merit |
| Order of the Red Star |
| Order for Service to the Homeland in the Armed Forces of the USSR 3rd class |
| Order of the Badge of Honour |
| Medal of the Order "For Merit to the Fatherland" 2nd class Military Division |
| Medal "In Commemoration of the 850th Anniversary of Moscow" |
| Medal "For Distinction in Military Service" 1st class |
| Jubilee Medal "60 Years of the Armed Forces of the USSR" |
| Jubilee Medal "60 Years of the Armed Forces of the USSR" |
| Medal "For Military Valour" 1st class |
| Medal "For Strengthening Military Cooperation" |
| Medal "For Distinguished Military Service" 1st class |
| Medal "For Impeccable Service" 2nd class |
| Medal "For Impeccable Service" 3rd class |
| Medal "200 Years of the Ministry of Defence" |
| Railway Troops Medal "For Distinction in Service" |
| Army General Margelov Medal |
| Decoration "For Service in the Caucasus" Gold |
| Decoration "Internationalist Warrior" (USSR) |
| Order of Bravery (Democratic Republic of Afghanistan) |
| Medal "From the grateful Afghan people" (Democratic Republic of Afghanistan) |

Military offices
| Preceded by Anatoly Kachanov | Commander of the 11th Separate Guards Air Assault Brigade; 1991–1995 | Succeeded by Vasily Malyk |
| Preceded by Valery Yevnevich | Commander of the 2nd Guards Tamanskaya Motor Rifle Division; 1995–1996 | Succeeded by Yevgeny Lazebin |
| Preceded by Position established | Deputy Commander of the Russian Airborne Forces for Airborne Training; 2002–2009 | Succeeded by Andrei Kholzakov |
