= Occupation of Gori =

Part of the Russo-Georgian War of 2008

- Part of the Russo-Georgian War
Date	13–22 August 2008 (1 week and 2 days)
Location	Gori, Georgia 41°58′52.86″N 44°06′34.35″E
Result	Russian victory
Territorial changes	Withdrawal from Gori itself, but Russian occupation in Georgia continues as of 2026

Belligerents
Russia; South Ossetia	Georgia

Commanders and leaders
Vyacheslav Borisov; Sulim Yamadayev	Unknown

Strength
Armed forces of Russia; Russian Ground Forces; Vostok Battalion; 58th Guards Combined Arms Army; Russian Air Force	Georgian Defence Forces; Georgian Police

Casualties and losses
	9 officers killed 3 officers missing
- 14 civilians killed 22 civilians missing 1 Dutch journalist (Stan Storimans) killed
- Creation of at least 56,000 Georgian refugees

During the Russo-Georgian War, the city of Gori in Georgia was militarily occupied by Russia for a period of nine days, beginning on 13 August 2008. Although it ultimately withdrew from Gori on 22 August, the Russian military has been occupying other parts of Georgia for almost two decades.

== Background ==
Gori is an important city in the centre of Georgia, located about 25 km (16 mi) from Tskhinvali. Gori is a key Georgian military and transport point. Gori lies along Georgia's principal east-west highway. Joseph Stalin, the ruler of the Soviet Union, was born in Gori.

== Invasion ==
=== Initial airstrikes ===
Georgian TV Rustavi 2 reported that four Russian planes bombed Gori at 11:00 a.m. Tbilisi time on 8 August 2008. The air attacks on other Human settlements in Georgia also took place and some of bombings were seen by journalists. The Georgian interior ministry forces were present in Gori. By the evening of 8 August 2008, Russia dropped a bomb close to a textile factory and a cellular tower in Gori.

At around 06:27 GMT on 9 August 2008, Reuters reported that a Georgian artillery installation near Gori was attacked by Russian warplanes. On 9 August, a Russian air attack targeted military garrisons in Gori, damaging the garrison, several apartment buildings and a school. Russians did not admit that non-combatants were intentionally attacked. The Daily Telegraph compared the bombing of Gori to the indiscriminate bombing of Grozny during the war in Chechnya. The Georgian government reported that the air raid had killed 60 civilians. According to the BBC, Gori was used as supporting ground for the Georgian military in South Ossetia and predominantly military positions in Gori had been attacked by Russian planes. According to the Russian source, three bombs hit an armament depot, and the façade of one of the adjacent 5-storey apartment buildings suffered damage as a result of exploding ammunition from the depot. No less than 5 Georgian cities had been bombed by 9 August. The downing of a Russian warplane and ejection of a pilot, whose bloodstained helmet was later broadcast by Georgian TV, was witnessed by civilians in Gori that day.

Mobilized Georgian reservists were arriving in Gori on 9 August. Georgian military did not admit journalists to the Gori hospital.

=== Georgian retreat ===
Russian military stated on early 10 August that their country had no intentions of advancing further into undisputed Georgia from South Ossetia. Georgian authorities announced ceasefire and reported Georgian withdrawal from South Ossetia on 10 August. Georgian government stated that a village between Gori and Kareli, Georgia was attacked in the morning, and the suburb of Gori was bombed in the late afternoon.

Georgian forces entered Gori on the evening of 10 August and the Georgian authorities said that Georgian troops would secure Gori, from which the civilians were fleeing. Alexander Lomaia, Secretary of Georgia's National Security Council, stated that Georgian forces were "very well positioned" to defend Gori. The BBC reported that although there was recession in Russian air attacks after two days of bombings, people were leaving Gori because they were wary of probable Russian advance towards the city. Georgian servicemen masked as civilians were spotted in the streets of Gori. Georgian official reported that artillery attack against Gori was launched at around 21:20. The United Nations High Commissioner for Refugees (UNHCR) and the World Food Programme calculated that about 80% of the residents of Gori had fled by 10 August. Internally displaced people from South Ossetia, who numbered "a few thousand" according to Georgian officials, also began fleeing Gori. People were mostly fleeing for Tbilisi. One fleeing Georgian villager was quoted as saying: "Tomorrow it will be Ukraine and nobody in the West is doing anything to stop them."

Although Russian UN ambassador Vitaly Churkin had claimed that Russia's only aim was "self-defense", Georgian president Mikheil Saakashvili told reporters on 11 August that Russian tank advance on Gori during the previous night was repulsed by Georgian forces. Another Georgian official said that by advancing towards Gori, the Russian forces were "trying to cut the country in half" and there would "probably be guerrilla warfare all over the country." Even Abkhaz separatist authorities raised concern about possible Russian advance to Gori.

After Georgian troops had left Tskhinvali on 10 August, the Russians indiscriminately bombed the civilian areas in Gori on 11 August by the afternoon and this was reported by The Guardian. While the gorge, where Gori is located, was held by Georgian forces until about 4 miles (6.4 km) from South Ossetia on 10 August, the Georgian positions were reportedly moved about 6 miles (9.7 km) to the south by the afternoon of 11 August. About a dozen detonations took place in the northern part of the gorge at about 12:30 pm. The Russian General Staff claimed that Russia's "key principle" was not to advance beyond South Ossetia. Georgian military said that the enemy artillery was already present in undisputed Georgia. The suburbs of Gori were encircled by Georgian military hardware to deter probable Russian invasion.

French foreign minister Bernard Kouchner and Finnish foreign minister Alexander Stubb arrived in Gori on 11 August, with Kouchner wanting to see a "strong picture". At 17:00 MSK, Saakashvili visited Gori and was wearing vest. Security guards pushed Georgian president Saakashvili down in Gori when Russian jets flew over. Kouchner then flew to Vladikavkaz.

At about 17:00, Georgian Interior Ministry officials said that Russian forces and tanks were moving in the direction of Gori. A Times reporter said that the "residents watched in horror" the "sudden and dramatic" Georgian military withdrawal from Gori. The reporter described in detail how the Georgian tanks and armored personnel carriers fled to Tbilisi. The entrance into Gori from the Gori-Tbilisi highway was blocked by the police. The Daily Telegraph (UK) reported that it had seen "a full scale disorganised and panicked retreat from Gori". The Georgian forces had completely left Gori by 17:32 BST on 11 August. A Georgian official said that the troops were ordered to secure Tbilisi, the capital of Georgia. Georgian military regrouped at Mtskheta, 15 miles (24 km) from Tbilisi. Deputy Defense Minister Batu Kutelia said that they were "moving the defense line to Mtskheta." The Times reported that the skills of the Georgian troops, who had been flown from Iraq by the US, "were of little value" in defense of Gori against Russia and they made an "undignified" retreat to Tbilisi and suggested that staying in Baghdad would have been better for them.

Georgian official claimed that Gori was occupied by the Russian military. Russia dismissed the Georgian report of Russian occupation of Gori. Some spectators on the ground also denied the Russian presence in Gori. In addition to claims of Russian advance towards Gori, Georgian authorities also claimed that Russia was advancing in order to depose Saakashvili. Interfax cited Russian Defense Ministry representative as saying that Russia did not intend to attack Georgia's capital. Later, Georgia retracted earlier claims of Russian takeover of Gori.

Georgian president Mikheil Saakashvili stated that Russians had split Georgia into two by occupying an important intersection near Gori. Georgian journalist in Gori had confirmed the capture of the highway. A reporter, travelling from Tbilisi to Gori on 12 August, witnessed dozens of ditched Georgian military transports and artillery on the road.

The reporter wrote for the International Herald Tribune on 11 August that the Russian move towards Gori "seemed to suggest that Russia's aims in the conflict had gone beyond securing the pro-Russian enclaves of South Ossetia and Abkhazia to weakening the armed forces of Georgia."

=== Later airstrikes ===
During the night of 11-12 August, several minor incidents took place near the line of contact between Georgian and Russian forces. Artillery installations near Gori were being attacked by Russian warplanes. By 02:00 of 12 August, no legitimate military targets had remained in Gori.

Russian bombers attacked Gori on 12 August, killing seven people and wounding over thirty. Dutch TV journalist Stan Storimans was among those killed and another foreign reporter was injured. The war had already taken the lives of two other journalists. According to Georgian authorities, the Russians aimed at the city's administrative offices. The air raids set the post office and the Gori University on fire. The last remaining food shop was obliterated. The Gori Military Hospital carrying a Red Cross flag was struck by a rocket. The attack killed one doctor. Russia's deputy head of the General Staff, Colonel-General Anatoliy Nogovitsyn, did not admit to Russian air raid on Gori.

This final bombing of Gori, which preceded the announcement of an end to hostilities with the "punished" "aggressor" Georgia by Russian president Dmitry Medvedev, concluded five-day-long Russian air attacks on Gori. British Journalists later commented on the bombing of Gori's Stalin Square that "With no discernible military target, it seems clear that the Kremlin was effecting its own form of collective punishment on the town." The distance between the bombing site in central Gori and the Georgian military base was more than 3 km (2 mi).

Human Rights Watch (HRW) reported on 14 August that Russian warplanes were responsible for the bombing raids on Gori, which ended on 12 August. The death of Stan Storimans and wounding of dozen civilians in central Gori on 12 August was attributed to a cluster bombing. Numerous unexploded submunitions were subsequently found by local population in Gori Municipality and HRW documented them.

== Occupation ==
=== 13 August ===
The Russian military was warning during the march towards Gori on the morning of 13 August that they would not spare ethnic Georgian civilians in villages if the latter did not demonstrate signs of surrender. Escaping Georgians blamed Russian president Medvedev for their suffering because they, trusting Medvedev's statement on ceasefire, had remained in their homes before the Russian advance. The regular Russian troops were followed by Chechen, Cossack and Ossetian irregulars. Georgian civilians were fleeing Georgian villages located north of Gori, both in Georgia proper and South Ossetia. The Chicago Tribune noted that although the ceasefire was signed on 12 August, "the war continued to take a devastating toll Wednesday on civilians caught in the middle."

Russian forces captured Gori on 13 August, several hours after French president Nicolas Sarkozy negotiated the ceasefire agreement between Russia and Georgia. By 11:49 MSK, Georgian official said that 50 Russian tanks invaded Gori. Russian forces were blocking the roads to Gori, which had been abandoned by the Georgian authorities and law enforcement. The Los Angeles Times noted that the ceasefire agreement between Georgia and Russia "already seemed like an illusion".

Speculations arose that Russia possibly planned to assault Tbilisi. Russian armored column left Gori on 13 August, traveling along the main road to Tbilisi. However, the Russians stopped about a hour's drive from Tbilisi and encamped. Georgian servicemen occupied the road 6 miles (9.7 km) closer to Tbilisi and started setting up a line of defense. One Russian serviceman said they were ordered to remain where they had stopped and that the Russian military did not wish to advance further. Claims of Russian advance towards Tbilisi were dismissed by Russia. The Guardian commented that "there was no sign of the Georgian army. [...] it appears not to exist." The Los Angeles Times reported, "Georgia's defenses seem to have broken down completely."

Deputy chief of General Staff of Russia Anatoliy Nogovitsyn claimed that the Russian forces entered Gori only to negotiate with the local authorities, who were found to be absent, but there were no Russian tanks present. A Russian military spokesman said that military hardware and ammunition was being confiscated from a deserted warehouse near the city. The destruction of Georgian military bases began. South Ossetians began looting in Gori on 13 August. Russian authorities said that they would crack down on marauders.

Russian foreign minister Sergey Lavrov said that the Russian forces maintained their presence in Georgia in order to assist peacekeepers and they were defending "a major arsenal of armaments and military equipment" near Gori. Lavrov said that Russia would supply the population of Gori with food. General Vyacheslav Borisov of the Pskov Airborne Division claimed that Russian troops would not advance past the periphery of Gori into the city.

On late 13 August 2008, Aleksandre Lomaia, secretary of Georgia's National Security Council, departed for Gori because the people had asked for help and "to get [the Russians] out of the city and to let the police in." He met with Russian soldiers for the first time during sunset. Estonian ambassador to Georgia commented on the scene of fires near Gori that it was difficult to imagine such scene in the 21st century. Major General Vyacheslav Borisov (the commander of the Russian occupying troops) told Lomaia that the Russian presence did not upset the locals of Gori. Lomaia was allowed into abandoned Gori after meeting with Borisov. Journalist reported for The Washington Post that "the area just outside its city center looked like a Russian military base".

=== 14–15 August ===
Russian troops were supposed to leave Gori by the morning of 14 August. Russian military let Georgian police into Gori and at about 10:00, combined guards of Georgian police and Russian forces in Gori were authorized by Russian major general while Russian troops were readying to withdraw. Interfax reported at 12:10 MSK that the Russian army gave back control of Gori to the Georgian Police. Major-general Borisov said Russian troops would begin leaving Gori in two days and claimed that the rumours about damaged town and marauding "do not correspond to reality". Alexander Lomaia, who was in Gori negotiating with the Russians, said on Rustavi-2 TV on the live broadcast that the situation in Gori was calm and Russian army only did patrolling job. The United Nations High Commissioner for Refugees and the World Food Programme workers were also preparing to enter Gori to lay the groundwork for humanitarian assistance. Combined patrol efforts by the Russian Army and Georgian police in Gori soon broke down at about 13:00 due to apparent tensions between servicemen. Georgian policemen withdrew from Gori. No agreement on the Russian withdrawal from Gori was reached. A showdown between Georgian and Russian forces near Gori occurred and the entrance was reinforced by Russian tanks by the afternoon. It was reported that explosions took place near Gori. Vyacheslav Borisov declared that he had allowed the residents to Gori to come back. Accounts of execution of civilians having taken place in Gori since Russian advance had emerged. Regarding Russian control of Gori, Russia's UN ambassador, Vitaly Churkin, claimed that Russian forces "are not in Gori, have never been in Gori and do not occupy Gori." He denied reports that Gori was destroyed. Some Russian troops near Gori complained to journalists that they had been hungry for days. Russian tanks began to move towards Tbilisi, the capital, but soon stopped.

The next day, Russian forces pushed to about 40 kilometres (25 mi) from Tbilisi, the nearest during the war, and stopped in Igoeti (41°59′22″N 44°25′04″E) at the same time as the United States Secretary of State Condoleezza Rice was received by Georgian president Saakashvili. The parts of Georgian army, which were entrenched nearby, did not deter Russians from blocking the key east-west highway of Georgia. Melik Kaylan later wrote for Forbes in 2009: "Once Condi got there, the situation stabilized. If Moscow attacked, the U.S. and Russia would be at war."

The network coverage of the Georgian cellular operators in Gori vanished and the signal of Russian MegaFon began to be served to Georgian cellular subscribers on 15 August. On late 15 August, Russian defense ministry official General Nikolay Uvarov reported that the Russian army had almost finished the disposal of the Georgian weapons in the base near Gori.

Major-General Vyacheslav Borisov said on 14 August, "Now Ossetians are running around and killing poor Georgians in their enclaves." A Russian officer commented on the prevention of the marauding: "It's not our job to do police work." The New York Times noted that some Russian troops sometimes have tried to curb the anarchy. Even the United Nations and journalistic cars were carjacked. Militiamen opened fire on journalists on 14 August and fired upon Turkish journalists on 15 August. The Herald suggested on the situation in Gori that the Russian forces were "hampering efforts by humanitarian organisations to alleviate the suffering of those still inside Gori." According to the Hague Convention, an occupying power has to guarantee public order and safety in the occupied areas.

=== 16–22 August ===
Russian forces turned back some humanitarian aid missions trying to help the population, with only the United Nations (UN) managing to bring small food provisions to the city. The humanitarian conditions in Gori by 16 August was assessed as "desperate" by the United Nations. Majority of journalists were not let into Gori. Human Rights Watch (HRW) reported that following Russian takeover of Georgian areas, Georgians from Gori and the adjacent villages reported South Ossetian militias pillaging and assaulting Georgian properties as well as abducting civilians. Russian Kommersant newspaper reported that the Russian deployment towards Tbilisi began in several hours after Russian president Medvedev had signed the ceasefire agreement on 16 August.

According to BBC's Gabriel Gatehouse, Russian troops in Gori were "much-reduced" on 17 August. Humanitarian relief was brought to the city; however, Russians were still in charge of major entrances of Gori. The Russian commander stated that Russian forces would remain to curb plunder until Georgian police was prepared to assume responsibility. Major General Vyacheslav Borisov claimed that day to have ordered Russian peacekeepers to be deployed in Igoeti in place of regular Russian forces, but this was brushed off by Georgia as "just a redeployment". UNHCR visited Gori on 17 August and stated that many shops and apartments had been robbed by marauders and that only 50-60 residents had remained. According to The New York Times and The Pentagon, there were no indications of the Russian pullout that day as Medvedev had promised. President of France Nicolas Sarkozy explained that the Russian occupation of Georgia's principal highway and Gori was not legally permitted under the ceasefire agreement. Georgian authorities were not let into Gori that day. A Russian soldier near Gori was reported to have suggested that the Russian forces would "be in Georgia for a very long time."

New checkpoints were erected by the Russian forces on the Tbilisi-Gori road on August 17. South Ossetian forces occupied Akhalgori and one fighter said that "It will be part of an independent country within the Russian Federation." The Guardian commented that Moscow's apparent plan to recreate Greater South Ossetia was coming to fruition. The Times reported from Gori on 18 August that Russian troops had reportedly told Georgian civilians fleeing South Ossetia: "Putin has given us an order that everyone must be either shot or forced to leave". Few Russian servicemen were seen inside Gori and the residents reported that there were Russian armored patrols after 22:00 curfew during the night. Georgian official Alexander Lomaia said that he didn't know when the Russian forces would leave Gori. Russians permitted the International Red Cross and the United Nations High Commission for Refugees entry into Gori. Russians had established six checkpoints between Gori and Igoeti with a column of Russian tanks being positioned in Kaspi in the direction of Tbilisi.

The Russian Ministry of Emergency Situations delivered humanitarian aid to Gori on 18 August. However, Russian Emergencies Minister Sergei Shoigu reported to Prime Minister Vladimir Putin that the distribution of the relief was hindered by the local authorities and the church.

On 20 August 2008, the Russian forces stopped a delegation of the Parliamentary Assembly of the Council of Europe near Igoeti and did not allow them to visit Gori. On 21 August, it was reported that Ambassador of France to Georgia Eric Fournier was detained by the Russian forces near Gori. The ambassador was returning from Sachkhere where he resisted the Russian occupation of the French-financed training base.

=== Withdrawal of Russian troops and aftermath ===
In the morning of 22 August, Georgia reported that Russian planes and helicopters began flying over Gori. At noon, Russian forces began leaving Gori. After the departure of Russian troops, Georgian police re-entered the city. The mayor of Tbilisi, Gigi Ugulava, said that "an organized return" of displaced Gori residents would be facilitated. The nearest Russian checkpoint in the village of Karaleti continued operation. Georgia's principal highway connecting east with west was now free for transit by the evening. According to the Georgian interior minister, the highway was in need of thorough inspection. Food Market resumed operation in Gori on 23 August.

The humanitarian situation in Gori on 27 August was still severe as many residents had no access to humanitarian assistance.

Journalist of German ARD TV told Vladimir Putin that he survived the Russian bombing of Gori by chance. Putin insisted that Russia had the right to act so under international law and did not apologize for the bombing of the residential areas.

In October 2008, EUobserver reported about Polish humanitarian worker who was in Gori after 11 August 2008. The Polish national said that he witnessed how the Russians fired on the EU flag in Gori in apparent demonstration of ideological hostility towards the European values and he wanted to award the damaged flag to the European Parliament.

== Gallery ==
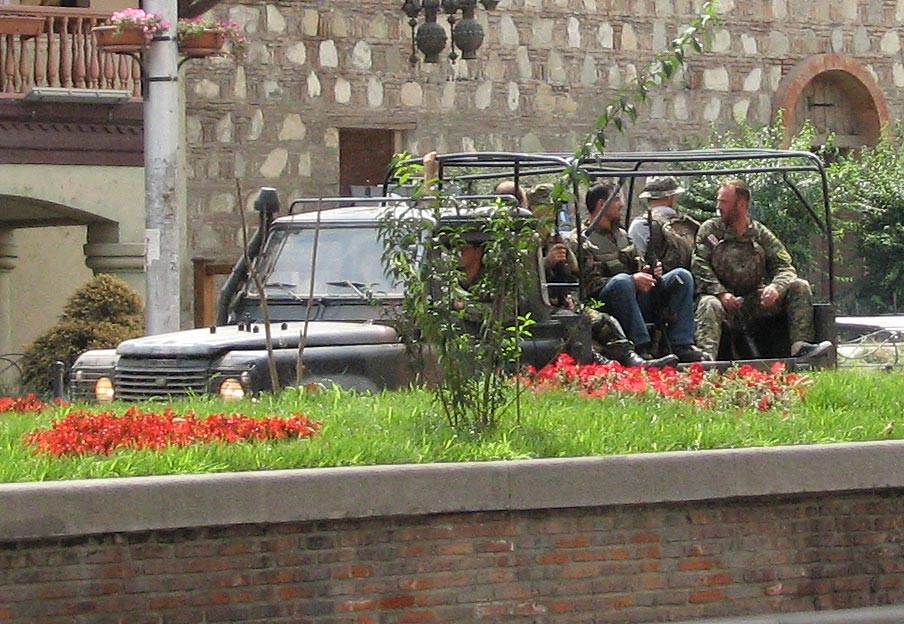
Georgian conscripts in Tbilisi after retreating from Gori

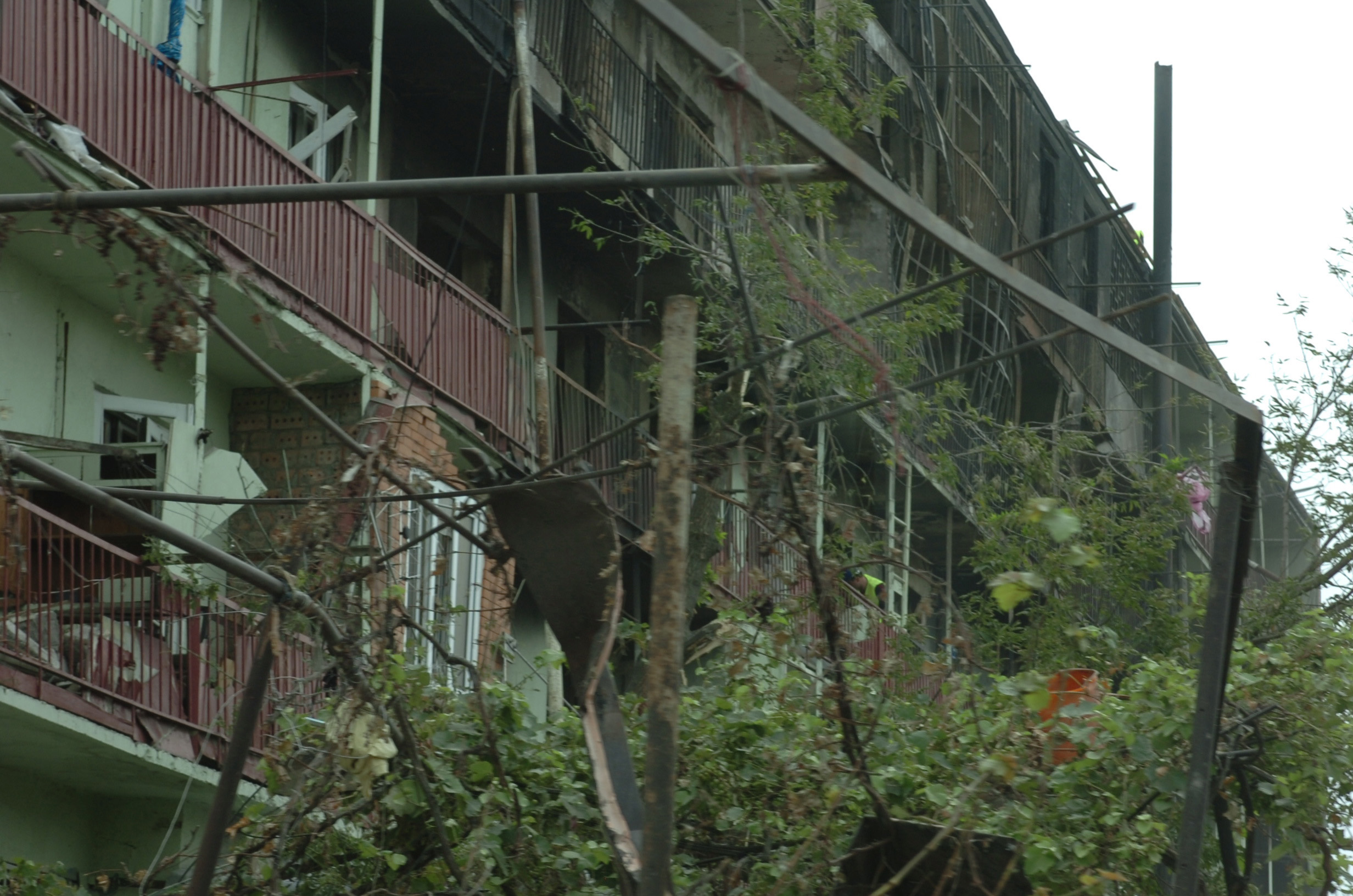
A burnt apartment building where 16 people were reportedly killed

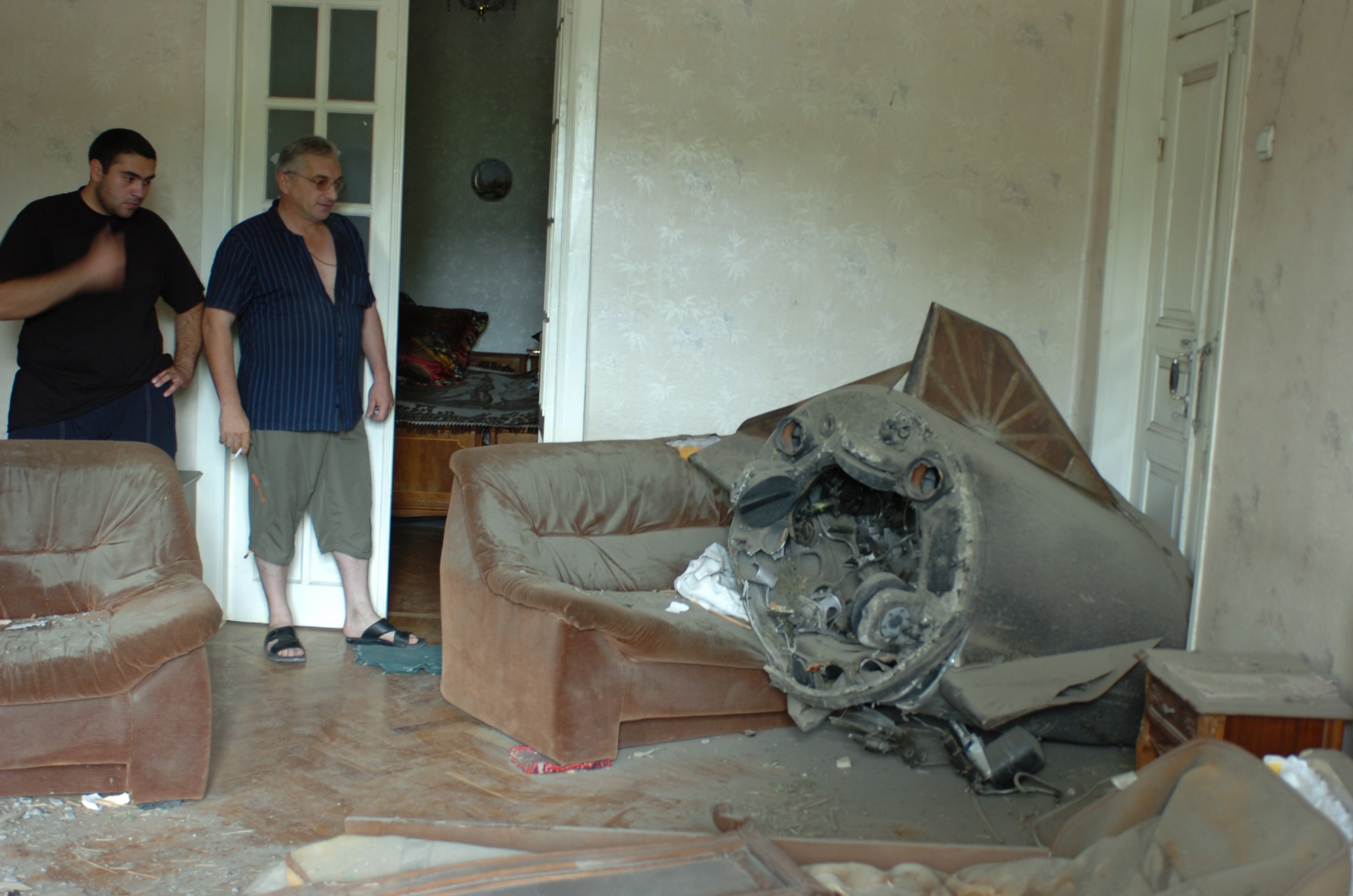
The propulsion stage of a Russian missile in a civilian apartment on August 25, 2008

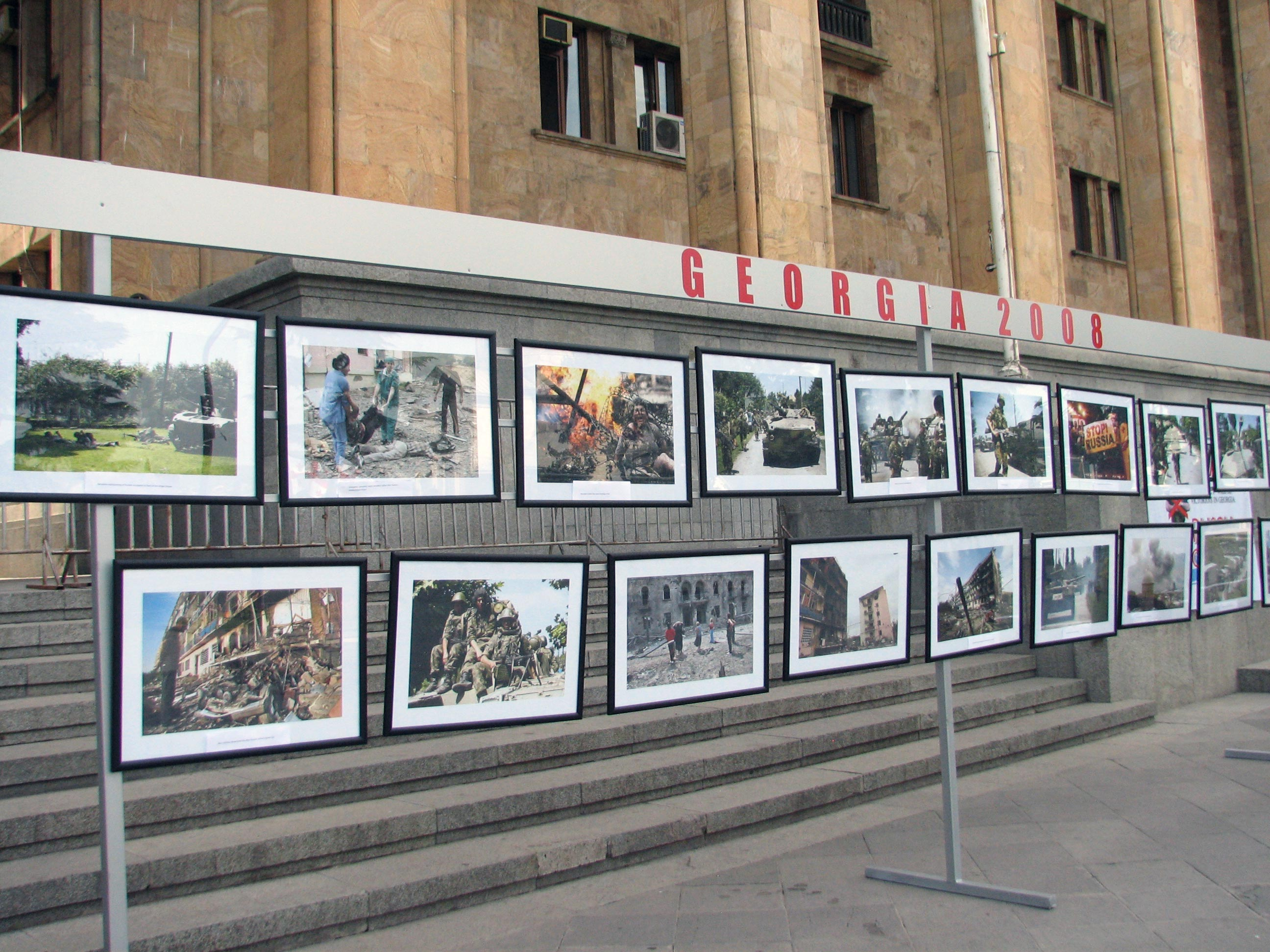
Pictures on display outside the Georgian parliament showing the destruction after Russian bombings in Gori

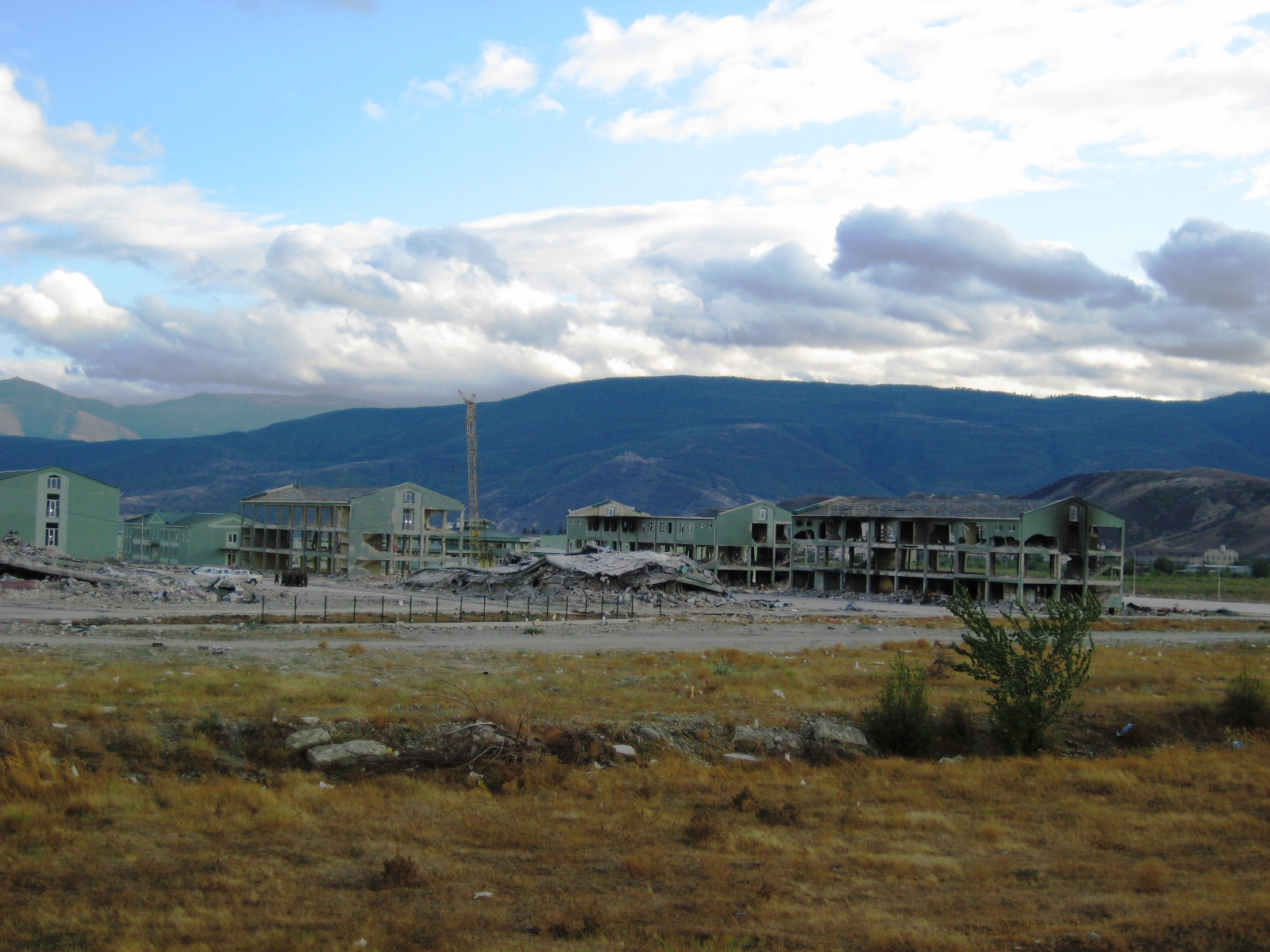
A Georgian military base near Gori largely demolished by Russian troops

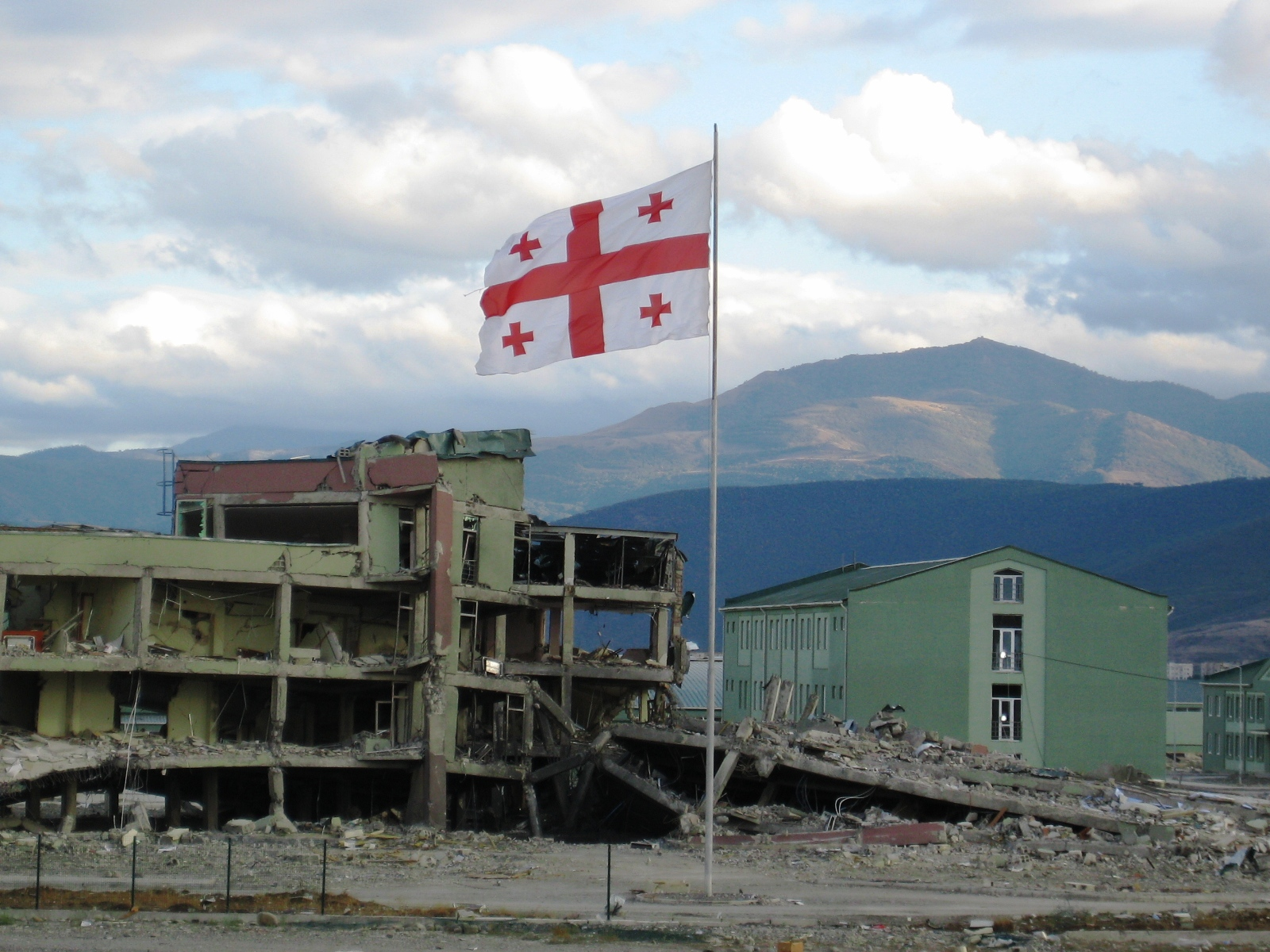
A destroyed Georgian military base in Gori

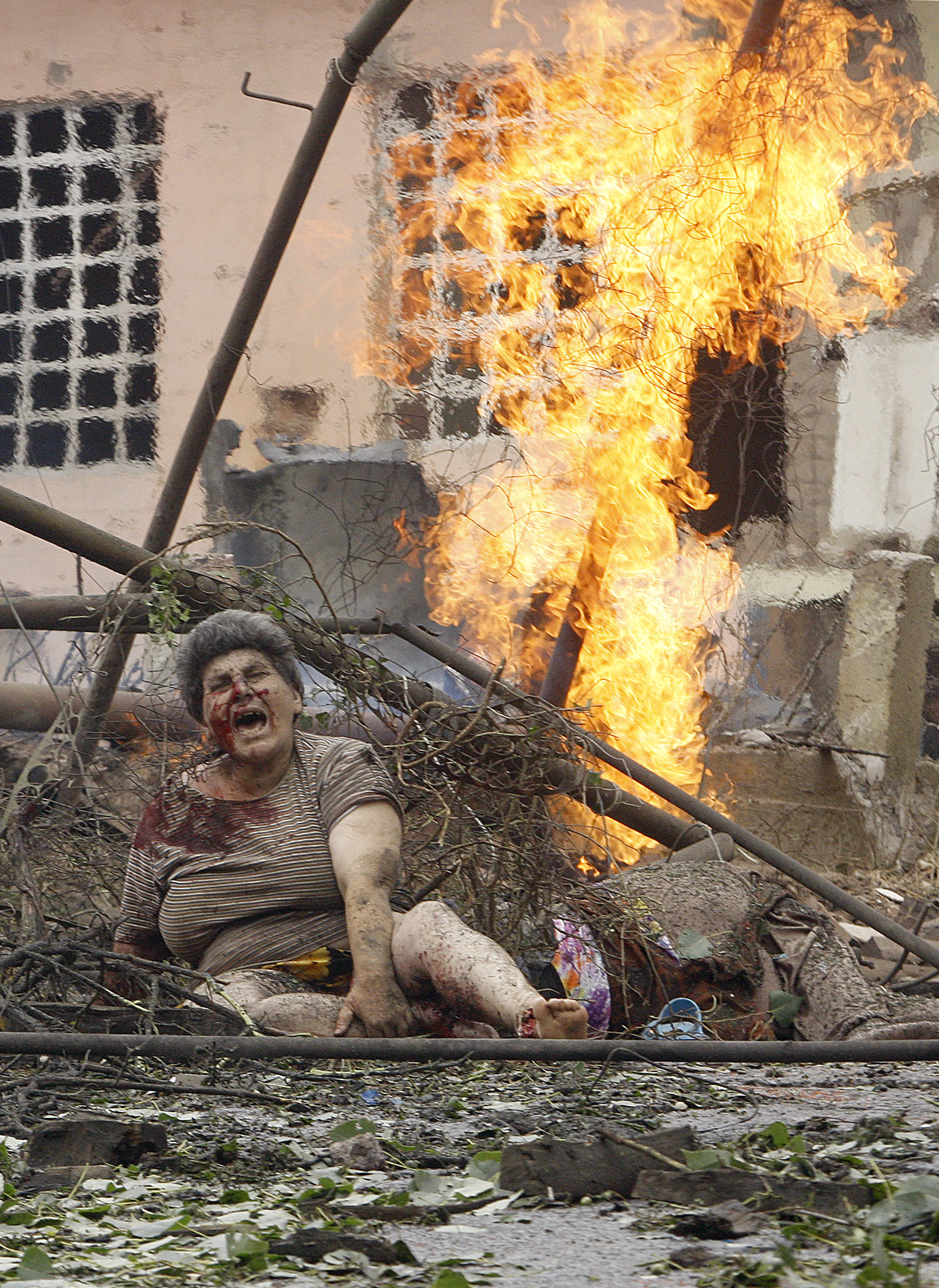
An injured woman sitting in rubble following a Russian bombing attack on Gori

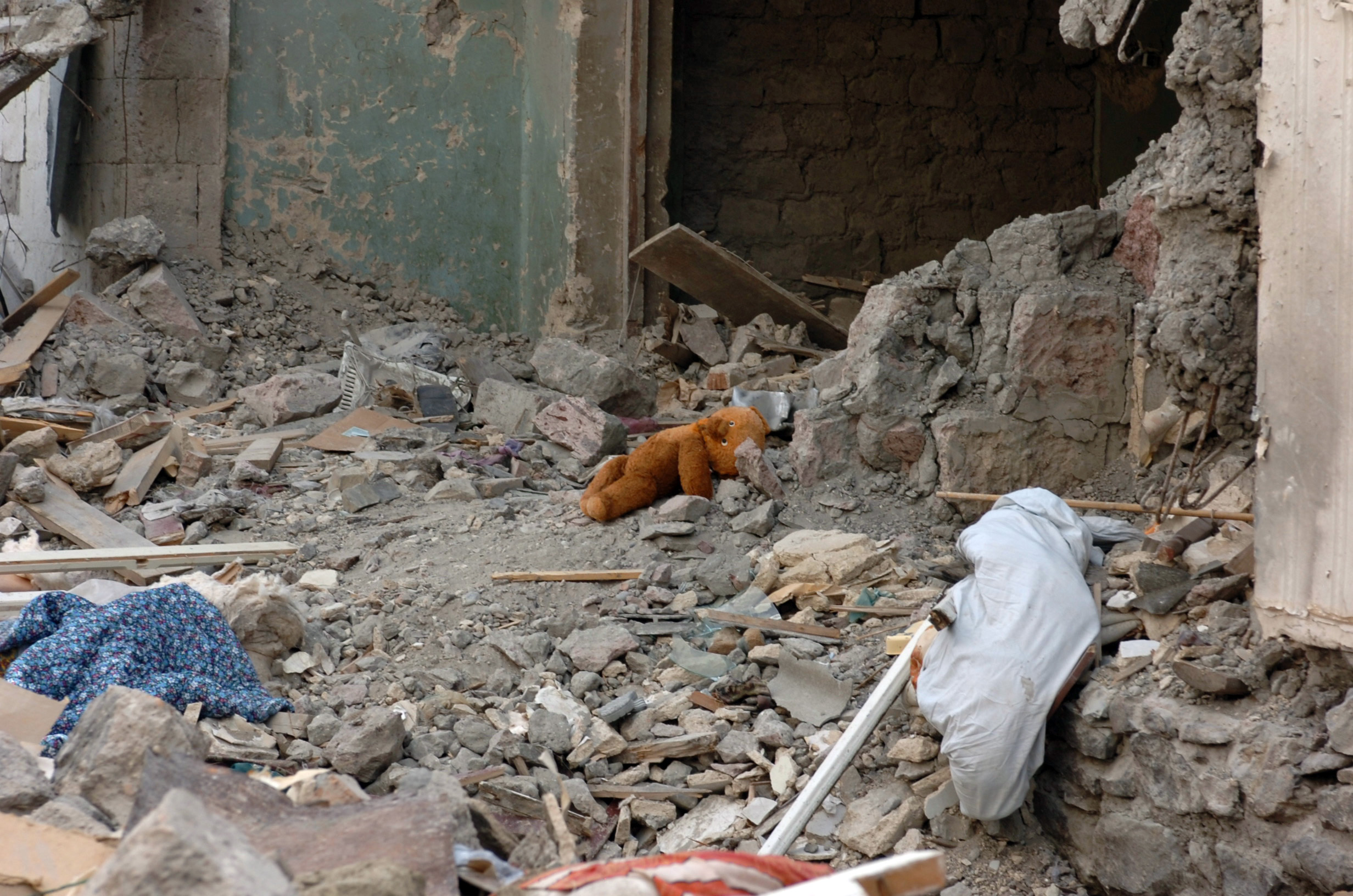
Teddy Bear in ruins, after Russian air strikes

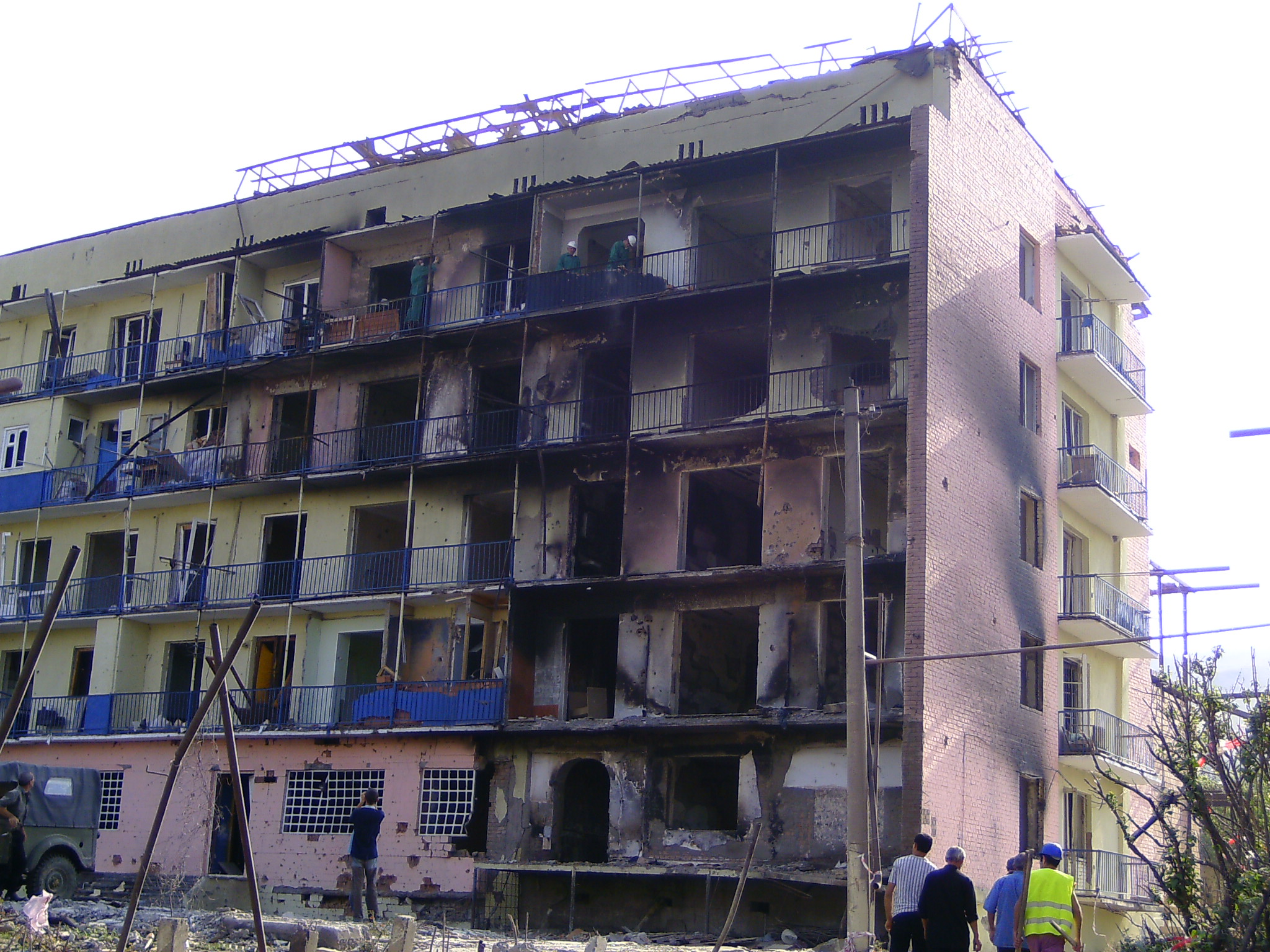
Destroyed apartment building in Gori after Russian air raid, picture taken 10 September 2008

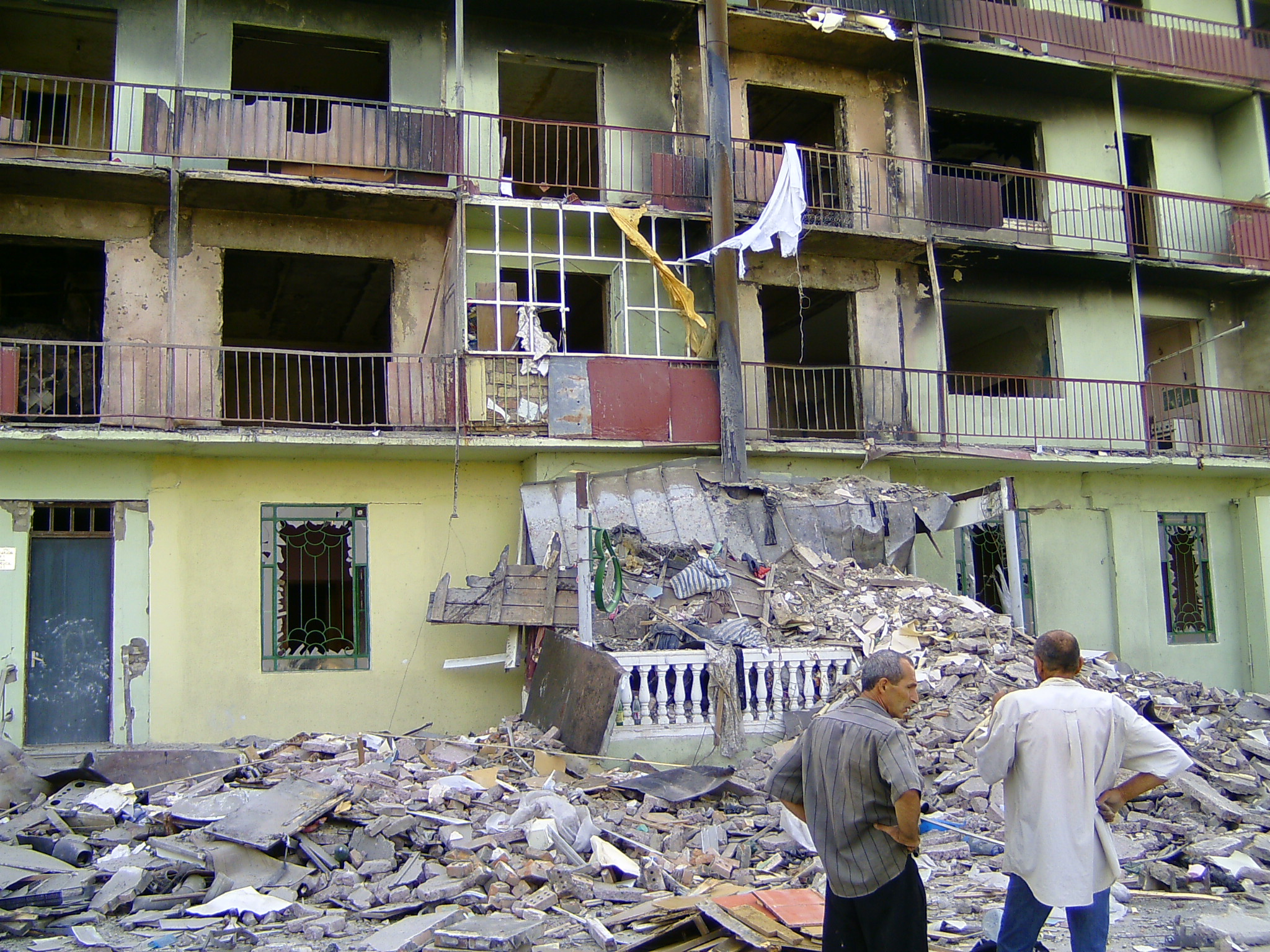
An air raid of the Russian army in August 2008 destroyed this house in Gori
