= Stan Storimans =

Dutch RTL television cameraman (1969–2008)

- Born: 8 January 1969; Tilburg, Netherlands
- Died: 12 August 2008 (aged 39); Gori, Georgia
- Cause of death: Missile strike
- Occupation: Photojournalist (television cameraman)
- Years active: c. 1984–2008
- Employer: RTL Group
- Known for: Being the only foreign national (civilian) to have been killed in the Russo-Georgian War
- Spouse: Marjolein Storimans-Verhulst
- Children: 2

Stanislaus Norbertus Ida Maria Storimans (8 January 1969 – 12 August 2008) was a Dutch photojournalist employed by RTL Nieuws who was killed in a Russian missile strike against the Georgian city of Gori while reporting on the 2008 Russo-Georgian War.

== Career ==
At the age of 15, Stan Storimans joined Persbureau Van Eijndhoven in Tilburg as a holiday job, where he worked on sound, editing and camera work, specializing in the latter. Starting as a sound engineer for NOS Journaal, Storimans found employment as a camera operator with television news service RTL Nieuws from 1989 onwards. He made his most prominent reports in conflict-affected areas, such as the former Yugoslavia, Zaire, Ethiopia, Indonesia, Palestine, Sri Lanka, and later in Afghanistan and Iraq. Storimans also filmed major sporting events, such as the 2002 and 2006 Winter Olympics, and the 2008 European Football Championship.

From 2000, Storimans ran his own media company in his North Brabant hometown of Goirle, called Storicam Mediaproducties, which he operated with his wife and three cameramen. His widow continued the company in collaboration with the cameramen that Storimans employed. As of 2010, Storicam still worked for RTL Nieuws, but also for the current affairs program EenVandaag.

At the time of Storimans' death, author Johan van Grinsven had been working on a book describing Storimans' 20 years of reporting from conflict zones, which was published posthumously on his 40th birthday in 2009.

== Death ==
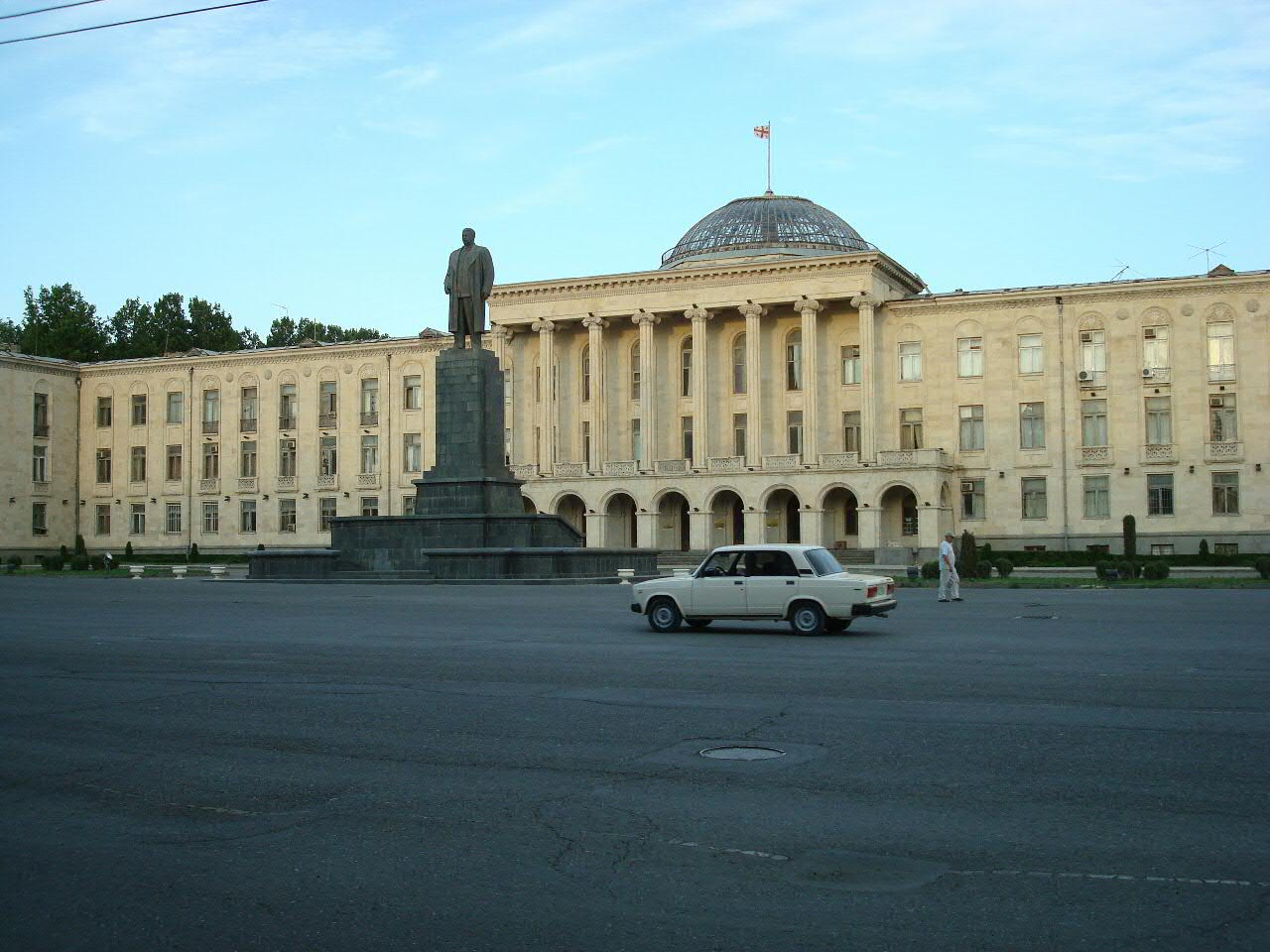
Gori's city hall and the statue of Stalin on its central square, 2007

On 11 August 2008, Stan Storimans had traveled to Tbilisi with RTL correspondent Jeroen Akkermans to report on the Russian invasion of Georgia. Upon hearing that the city of Gori had been abandoned ahead of the Russian military offensive, the duo arranged for a taxi driver to take them there the next day. The following morning they were joined by Tsadok Yecheskeli, an Israeli reporter for Yedioth Ahronoth. After witnessing bombings on the hills around the city, which the men took to be harmless due to the great distance at which these took place, they arrived in Gori at 10:00 on the morning of 12 August. Over the following half hour, the journalists viewed a number of locations in the city, such as damaged apartment blocks and the local hospital, before they came to the northeastern corner of Gori's central square. Moments before, a collision between two cars had taken place on the otherwise deserted square. While Akkermans and Yecheskeli stayed near the taxi, where other journalists were also gathered, Storimans walked onto the square to record footage of a statue of Joseph Stalin, among other things. He walked back around 10:45 and had almost reached the taxi when explosions occurred.

The bombing resulted in the deaths of Storimans, who suffered a fatal head wound, and 11 Georgian civilians. More than 20 other people were injured, including Yecheskeli, who was severely wounded and evacuated to Israel for treatment after surgery in Tbilisi, and Akkermans and the taxi driver, who both sustained nonthreatening leg injuries. All had been struck by shrapnel from a projectile that had impacted near the city's three-story television and radio center where a top-floor media center had been set up, some 200 meters/yards from Gori's city hall. Other buildings in the immediate area had also been hit, but no structural damage was reported. Immediately after the explosion, two small craters were found on the square, as well as the remains of the then-unidentified projectile.

Sandra Roelofs, the Dutch-born wife of Georgian President Mikheil Saakashvili, offered to attend Storimans' funeral, but his family declined the offer as they did not want to politicise the ceremony. Storimans was buried on 21 August 2008 on the Vredehof cemetery in Tilburg. Dutch ministers Ronald Plasterk and Maxime Verhagen were present during the memorial service at Saint Lucas' Church.

=== Investigations ===
After an early assessment by Reuters indicated that the blasts might have been the result of Russian mortar fire, Human Rights Watch reported that it had found evidence that the Russian military had been using controversial cluster munitions in Georgia, including in the attack on Gori.

The Dutch member of parliament and Foreign Affairs spokesman Harry van Bommel said that Foreign Minister Maxime Verhagen summoned the Russian ambassador for clarification regarding reports of alleged use of cluster bombs by Russian forces in Georgia; he also urged the Dutch government to persuade the Russians to sign the Convention on Cluster Munitions. The Director-General of UNESCO, Kōichirō Matsuura, also condemned the killings and recalled the obligation under international law to respect the civilian status of reporters. He called on the authorities to investigate and take appropriate action.

On 20 October 2008, the Dutch government announced its investigation has found that Storimans was in fact killed by a Russian cluster munition after the withdrawal of the Georgian army from the city. The investigative team sent to Georgia to gather forensic evidence and eyewitness accounts concluded Storimans was killed by a munition "propelled by a type of missile that is only found in Russia's military arsenal". Foreign Minister Maxime Verhagen called the findings "very serious" and said in a statement he had "made that clear to the Russian authorities. Cluster munitions must not be used in this way. There were no troops present in Gori and innocent civilians were killed." Verhagen said the Netherlands plans to raise the matter with the Organization for Security and Co-operation in Europe.

=== Legal proceedings ===
On 19 April 2024, Storimans' widow, Marjolein Storimans-Verhulst, and his former colleague Jeroen Akkermans announced that they had filed a complaint for war crimes with the International Crimes Team of the Dutch Public Prosecution Service against six (former) Russian servicemen. The accused are the driver of an Iskander missile launcher vehicle and a number of officers and their commanders, who are charged with attacking the city of Gori at a time it could not be considered a legitimate military target due to the lack of a Georgian military presence. The evidence for these charges was gathered and scrutinized through, among other things, open-source intelligence (OSINT). In the statement, a comparison was made to the criminal case following the 2014 shoot-down of Malaysia Airlines Flight 17, in which a Dutch court found two Russians and a Russian separatist in Ukraine guilty of shooting down the airliner and killing 298 civilians—193 of whom had been Dutch nationals.

== Stan Storimans Award ==
On 12 November 2009, the first Stan Storimans Award was presented; a prize for camera operators of news and current affairs programs. Its initiator and organizer was Peter van der Maat, editor-in-chief of the current affairs TV show Netwerk, who had worked frequently with Storimans since 1988 as a reporter for NOS Journaal and RTL Nieuws. The award was presented by Storimans' widow. Since 2015, the Stan Storimans Award has been a part of the prestigious De Tegel journalism awards, becoming the Storimans Tegel. It was first awarded in this new form on 31 March 2016 in The Hague.

=== Laureates ===
- 2009 - Joris Hentenaar, for a report on the war in Afghanistan for the current affairs TV program NOVA
- 2010 - Rachid el Mourif, for his Netwerk report on the earthquake in Haiti
- 2011 - Ivo Coolen, for his report on the Egyptian revolution for Nieuwsuur
- 2012 - Roel Rekko (NOS Journaal), for his report on the funeral of a murdered politician in Syria
- 2013 - Jeroen Kelderman (RTV Drenthe, photojournalist), for a report on the work of the Airmobile Brigade in Kunduz, Afghanistan
- 2014 - Erik Kooyman (Omroep West), for a documentary about the Schilderswijk in The Hague

== See also ==
- Netherlands–Russia relations
- Georgian–Ossetian conflict
- Occupation of Gori
