= Cherkaske missile attack =

Missile attack on Ukraine

- Type: Missile strike
- Target: Ukrainian Ground Forces
- Date: 1 March 2025
- Executed by: Russian Air Force
- Casualties: Per Ukraine: 32–39 killed over 90 wounded Per Russia: 150 Ukrainian soldiers and 30 foreign instructors killed

On 1 March 2025, a missile attack by the Russian Armed Forces hit a Ukrainian training ground in Cherkaske, Dnipropetrovsk Oblast, Ukraine.

== Event ==
On 1 March 2025, a Russian Iskander-M missile struck a Ukrainian military training ground located 130km from the frontline. The attack was recorded by a Russian Orlan-10 drone, and footage circulated in social media.

On 3 March, Ukrainian Commander Mykhailo Drapatyi reported that Russian forces struck a Ukrainian military camp in Cherkaske. Drapatyi did not specify the number of losses suffered, but said that he ordered an investigation on the circumstances of the attack.

The Commander in Chief of the Ukrainian Forces, Oleksandr Syrskyi, said the same day that the head and commander of the military unit were suspended from the Army, and called for further investigation into the actions that lead to the deaths and injuries of Ukrainian servicemen.

Ukrainian journalist Andrii Tsaplienko reported that the Ukrainian unit struck during the cluster munitions attack was the 157th Separate Mechanized Brigade based in Samar, Dnipropetrovsk Oblast, that was present at the settlement of Cherkaske during training. The 157 Mechanized Brigade was formed in spring 2024 and participated in the fighting for Kurakhove and Pokrovsk. Another journalist, Yurii Butusov, reported a different account, in which the attack targeted another formation, the 168th Reserve Battalion with losses ranging from 32 to 39 killed and more than 90 wounded. Russian officials said the missile attack killed 150 Ukrainian nationals and 30 foreign instructors.

== Aftermath ==
On 1 June, another Russian attack took place, 12 soldiers were killed and 60 were wounded, after the attack the Commander of the Ukrainian Ground Forces Mykhailo Drapatyi resigned.
