= Krivoi Rog Air Base =

Ukrainian Air Force base in Dnipropetrovsk Oblast

Kryvyi Rih Dolhintseve Dolgintsevo
- Kryvyi Rih in Ukraine

Site information
- Type: Air Base
- Owner: Ministry of Defence
- Operator: Ukrainian Air Force

Location
- Shown within Ukraine Kryvyi Rih (Europe)
- Coordinates: 47°53′19″N 33°32′03″E

Site history
- In use: 1946–2004; 2017–present

Garrison information
- Garrison: 16th Military-Transport Aviation Regiment (1964–1979); 363rd Military-Transport Aviation Regiment, 3rd Air Squadron, 6th Guards Military Transport Aviation Division (1946–2004); Ukrainian Air Force (2017–present)

Airfield information
- Elevation: 10 metres (33 ft) AMSL
Runways
Direction	Length and surface
18/36	2,500 metres (8,202 ft) Concrete

Kryvyi Rih (during the USSR period was also called in Russian: Krivoy Rog) is a Ukrainian Air Force airbase located near Kryvyi Rih city in south-central Ukraine.

The base was home to the 16th Military-Transport Aviation Regiment of the Soviet Air Forces between 1964 and 1979 with the Antonov An-12. along with the 363rd Military-Transport Aviation Regiment between 1946 and 1992 with the Ilyushin Il-76MD.

In 2017, in view of the funding and position on increasing combat capabilities, the Air Force Command decided to restore the airfield. Now [in 2018] "Kryvyi Rih" is ready to receive all aircraft types that are in service.

On 19 September 2023, Russian sources claimed that a ZALA Lancet conducted a strike against a Ukrainian Air Force MiG-29 fighter stationed at Krivoi Rog, some 70 km from front line on the Dnieper River. The MiG was reportedly hit near the cockpit.
