= Humanitarian impact of the Russo-Georgian War =

The Russo-Georgian War had a huge humanitarian impact on the lives of civilians. In the aftermath of the war, ethnic Georgians were expelled from South Ossetia and most of the Georgian villages were razed.

== South Ossetians ==
=== Tskhinvali ===
Russian media reported on 9 August that several journalists in Tskhinvali had gone into hiding as they appealed to the international community for right of passage. Mart Laar, Estonian adviser to Georgian president, alleged by 13 August 2008 that Russia was not allowing international missions into Tskhinvali so the people under the rubble would die.

Mayor of Tskhinvali Robert Guliev claimed on 12 August 2008 that almost 70% of Tskhinvali buildings were damaged or destroyed. Russian deputy Minister of Regional Development Vladimir Blank said that about 20 percent of Tskhinvali's some 7,000 buildings had been damaged and 10 percent were "beyond repair".

According to western journalists who had begun arriving in the city and were toured by the Russian military on 12 August, some urban areas "seemed to have little damage", while Tskhinvali's government area took the severe blow. Tskhinvali hospital was minimally damaged. Gazeta.ru reported that the term "wiped off from the Earth" did not apply to Tskhinvali. The Wall Street Journal reported on 15 August that Tskhinvali had not suffered severe damage from the war. Western journalist visited Tskhinvali on 17 August and wrote for McClatchy DC that "almost all of the buildings seen in an afternoon driving around Tskhinvali were still standing." He further noted that Tskhinvali "was scarred but still standing" while Deputy Chief of General Staff of the Armed Forces of the Russian Federation Anatoliy Nogovitsyn had claimed that "Tskhinvali doesn't exist, it's like Stalingrad was after the war."

Human Rights Watch (HRW) visited the mostly desolate Tskhinvali on 13 August 2008 and reported that "numerous" buildings had been affected by the war, adding that some buildings had been attacked by "inherently indiscriminate" weapons normally not used in civilian zones. Such weapons are BM-21 Grad multiple rocket launchers. HRW could not "definitely" lay blame for the wreckage either on Georgia or Russia due to the use of the exactly same Soviet armaments by both countries. Human Rights Watch reported that a projectile launched from a Grad could have been responsible for wrecking several rooms of the Tskhinvali hospital. One doctor told Human Rights Watch that all the wounded had to be relocated to the basement.

=== Refugees ===
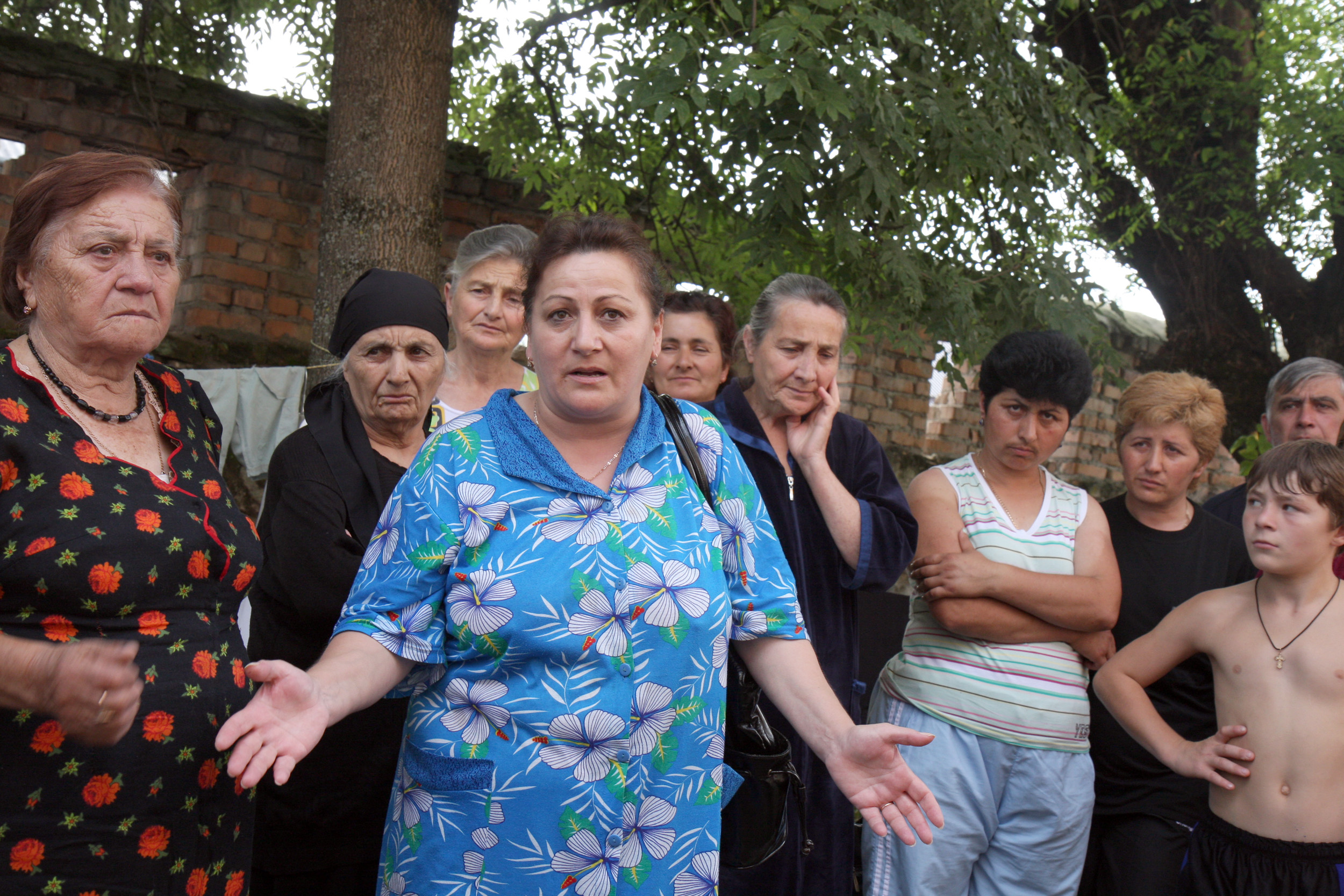
Women and children from South Ossetia in a refugee camp set up in the town of Alagir, North Ossetia, Russia.

The UN refugee agency, United Nations High Commissioner for Refugees (UNHCR), said that thousands of refugees left South Ossetia, mostly for North Ossetia–Alania in Russia by 8 August. Russian government agency in Vladikavkaz had counted the number of recorded South Ossetian refugees by 10 August 2008, which stood at 24,032; however, some of those refugees had been logged several times due to frequent travel and after Russia's full-scale invasion of Georgia, 11,190 of those refugees returned to South Ossetia, some of them to fight against Georgia.

On 14 August 2008, the Russian authorities reported that more than 12 thousand refugees had returned to South Ossetia.

On 15 August, the UNHCR said at least 30,000 people had arrived in North Ossetia from South Ossetia, with total number of displaced people (both Ossetians and Georgians) now standing at 115,000. On 16 August 2008, ITAR-TASS put the number of refugees present in North Ossetia at over 10,000 people.

=== Casualties ===
On 8 August 2008, the International Committee of the Red Cross (ICRC) urged the combatants to form a humanitarian corridor in South Ossetia to move the injured civilians out. The International Red Cross had information on 9 August that Tskhinvali hospitals were "overflowing".

On 9 August, the Russian ambassador to Georgia Vyacheslav Kovalenko claimed that at least 2,000 civilians were killed in Tskhinvali, adding that "The city of Tskhinvali doesn't exist anymore." According to western journalist who toured in Tskhinvali along with other western journalists by the Russian military on 12 August, there was hardly any proof that Georgian military intentionally attacked civilians and some Ossetian civilians admitted that the probable main targets of the Georgian military were the government buildings.

According to a doctor at Tskhinvali hospital, the hospital handled 273 injured (predominantly military) from 6 to 12 August, and received forty-four bodies (the majority of Ossetians killed in Tskhinvali). According to a later report by the Russian blogger, he asked the same doctor: "Could there possibly be 2,000 dead?" The doctor answered him: "If you’re counting the entire district, then yes."

Several South Ossetian women told HRW on 12 August that Georgian soldiers they had met did not want to attack the civilians and apparently only militias and hostiles were their targets. On 13 August, Human Rights Watch said that Georgian villagers in South Ossetia were threatened due to the conscious exaggeration of South Ossetian casualties by the Russian authorities. HRW representative also said: "By day five of a conflict one normally expects that there is some kind of list of the dead and injured, or at least an indication of their age and gender."

On 14 August, Russian and South Ossetian prosecutors started to investigate "genocide" perpetrated by Georgia against the Ossetian people. South Ossetian officials claimed 200 civilian corpses had been discovered while Russian investigators had found 60 dead civilians. While Russia was accusing Georgia of committing "genocide" in South Ossetia, The Wall Street Journal wrote that there was "little evidence of a high death toll." The WSJ reported that "the only dead bodies on show in Tskhinvali were those of five Georgian soldiers." On 20 August, the number of dead civilians identified was put by Russian official investigators at 133; The new reduced estimate was a tenth of the original fatality rate. Nevertheless, South Ossetian officials said 1,492 people died.

According to the testimonies of eye-witnesses, massive missile and bomb strikes by the Russian aircraft caused the bulk of the damage during the fighting in South Ossetia and Tskhinvali was shelled by Russian Grad MRLRs. One analyst suggested that Russia was responsible for the deaths of at least half of casualties in South Ossetia.

On 26 August 2008, Russian investigator claimed that proof of "genocide" of the South Ossetian people had been discovered. Aleksandr Bastrykin, the Head of the Investigative Committee of Russia, said that according to the witnesses, Georgian military used grenades against civilian sheltered in basements. He also claimed that "hundreds of houses" were obliterated by Georgians and a pregnant woman shot in the head had been found. Bastrykin claimed in early September that while so far only 134 civilian casualties had been documented, such low number did not mean that genocide did not happen. In August 2009, it was announced that the investigation of the "genocide" was extended until February 2010.

=== Hostages ===
On 18 August 2008, the South Ossetians alleged that Georgian troops had abducted 500 Ossetian persons from Tskhinvali. The Georgian government responded that they did not have any Ossetian in detention. By 20 August, the South Ossetian estimate was scaled down to some 170 "peaceful citizens" allegedly held by Georgia.

== Georgians ==
=== Bombings ===
On 9 August 2008, Russian warplanes dropped bombs on Gori and residential premises were damaged. Civilians were killed. Russian Foreign Minister Sergey Lavrov said that the Georgian shelling of Russian peacekeepers and civilian population warranted Russian air raids on Georgia. On 12 August 2008, the central square was bombed in Gori after the Georgian military had left Gori on 11 August. The bombing killed civilians, among them a Dutch journalist, and wounded Israeli journalist. This cluster bombing of Gori killed at least eight civilians and wounded dozens. The cluster attack on the Georgian town of Ruisi, located in the Kareli Municipality, on the same day claimed the lives of three civilians and injured five. It was the first time the weapons of such type were used since Israel had used them in the 2006 Lebanon War. The Gori Military Hospital carrying Red Cross flag was struck by a rocket.

On 15 August 2008, Human Rights Watch said it had collected proof of Russian warplanes using RBK-250 cluster bombs; rights group urged Russia to halt using the prohibited weapons. Russian General Anatoliy Nogovitsyn responded to the report by rejecting the Russian usage of cluster bombs because "There is no need to do so." Georgian doctors in Tbilisi treated the victims of cluster bombing. On 21 August 2008, HRW reported that unexploded cluster munitions were left in Gori Municipality; civilians continued to be killed and injured due to contact with unexploded cluster munitions long after the original bombings. Russia denied using cluster bombs, in spite of overwhelming proof.

On 28 August, United Nations Institute for Training and Research (UNITAR) Operational Satellite Applications Programme UNOSAT published report on an initial damage assessment on 19 August, based on satellite images of Gori. Total number of buildings that were classified as affected by Russian air raid, was 33, of which 18 were destroyed, and 15 were severely damaged. The UNOSAT report does not specify whether the damage was inflicted to military or civilian buildings.

=== Displacement of civilians ===
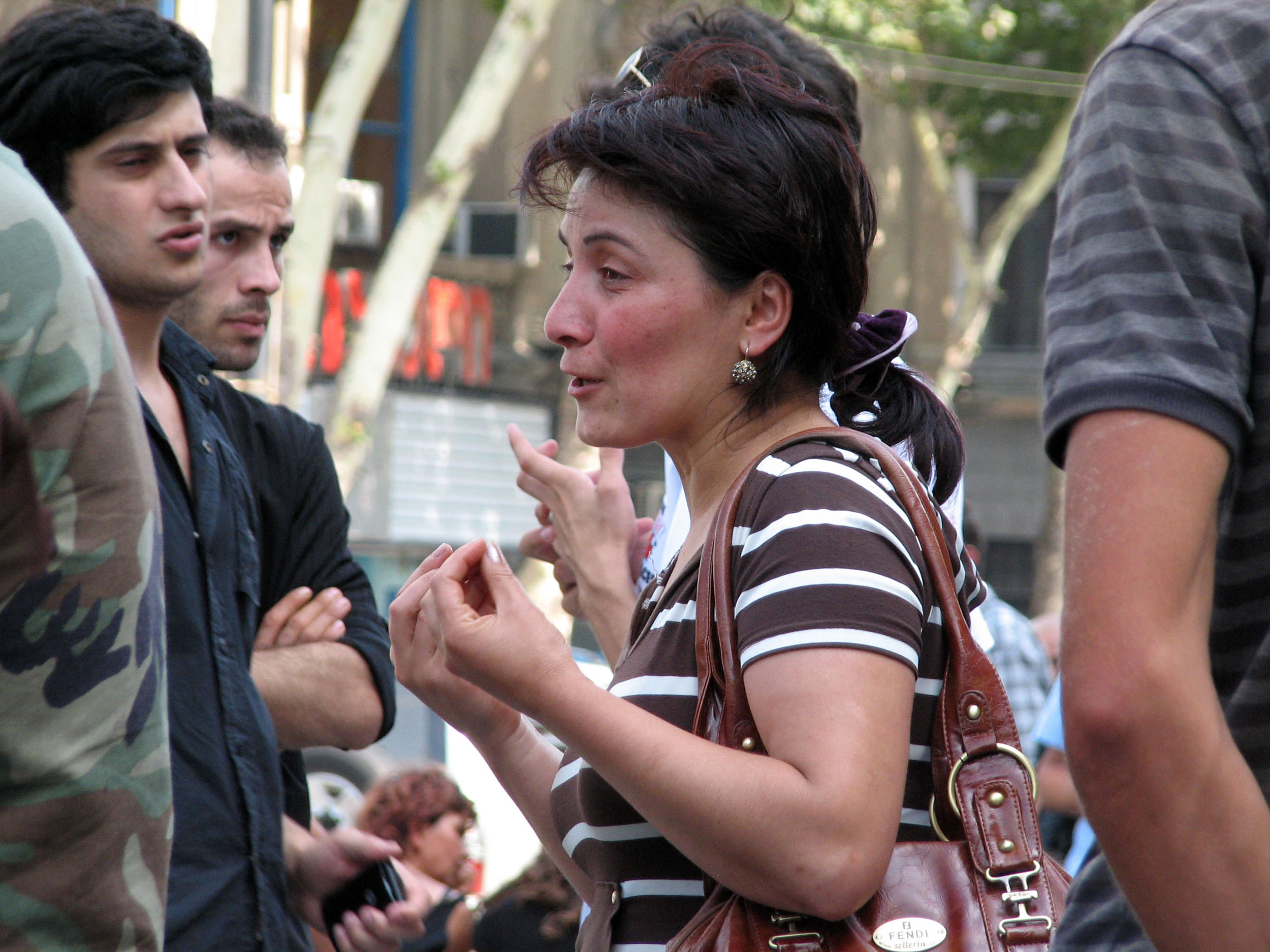
Refugees from South Ossetia asking for help outside the Georgian Parliament in Tbilisi on August 10, 2008.

According to one estimate, the pre-war population of ethnic Georgians living in South Ossetia was 18,000 people. This represented up to one quarter of South Ossetia's population.

On 10 August 2008, Georgia charged that ethnic cleansing of Georgians was occurring behind Russian lines. The Georgian villages located south of Tskhinvali underwent the bombardment before the Russian advance. Georgian president Mikheil Saakashvili commented on Russian "rampage" on 13 August: "What we are seeing is classic Balkan-type and WWII-type ethnic cleansing and purification campaigns." On 15 August, the UNHCR said that according to Georgia, up to 15,000 ethnic Georgians had departed South Ossetia for the rest of Georgia. As of 15 August 2008, some 73,000 uprooted people were present in Georgia proper. By 17 August 2008, many refugees in Tbilisi were jammed into provisional dwellings lacking any utilities and had no belongings with them, except the clothing on them. On 19 August, The Guardian commented on the situation north of Gori that the ethnic cleansing was "strikingly apparent". On 20 August 2008, Alexander Kvitashvili, Georgian minister for health, estimated that the war forced about 128,000 Georgian civilians (both in South Ossetia and Georgia proper) to flee their homes.

On 15 August, South Ossetian leader Eduard Kokoity, in the interview for Kommersant, officially confirmed that the alleged ethnic cleansing of South Ossetia was in fact committed against ethnic Georgians. He also said the Ossetians were not going to permit them to come back. South Ossetian leader said that the majority of the Georgian-controlled villages "had been virtually flattened."

The Times reported from Gori on 18 August that Russian troops had reportedly told Georgian civilians fleeing South Ossetia: "Putin has given us an order that everyone must be either shot or forced to leave". Georgians from South Ossetia described how their neighbours had been killed by Ossetian militants following Russian military. Journalist Michael J. Totten was told by one Georgian refugee that she had been told by Russian military that Georgians would be killed if they didn't abandon their homes. The Finnish Minister for Foreign Affairs and the OSCE chairman Alexander Stubb visited the war-affected area in Georgia in late August and accused the Russian troops of "clearly trying to empty southern Ossetia of Georgians." On 27 August, French foreign minister Bernard Kouchner accused the Russian forces of "ethnic cleansing, creating a homogeneous South Ossetia." British journalist Luke Harding wrote for The Guardian on 1 September that he had seen "the worst ethnic cleansing since the war in the Balkans", while the Russian army did not hinder a South Ossetian attempt "to create a mono-ethnic greater South Ossetia in which Georgians no longer exist".

The Russian army created a buffer area between Gori and South Ossetia. By 28 August 2008, the refugees recently returned to the villages north of Gori, which were still under the Russian military control, had to flee a renewed harassment by the South Ossetian militias. 2,300 people from the area north of Gori were recorded as internally displaced in Gori. It was reported that 18 Russian checkpoints had been established between Gori and South Ossetia which hindered the return of displaced persons. Journalist wrote for International Herald Tribune in early September that "the first thing that strikes" inside the 20-km wide "security zone" adjacent to South Ossetia is "the almost total lack of people". Russian military was not allowing the humanitarian mission of the United Nations High Commissioner for Refugees into the zone. HRW has recorded several attacks on civilian transports by Russian troops in the Gori district resulting in civilian casualties.

The Georgian civilians, who resided in the Akhalgori district and were willing to live in South Ossetia, were coerced into obtaining a Russian passport. Many displaced persons were able to go back to their homes after the war, but a year later around 30,000 ethnic Georgians were still uprooted.

=== Looting ===
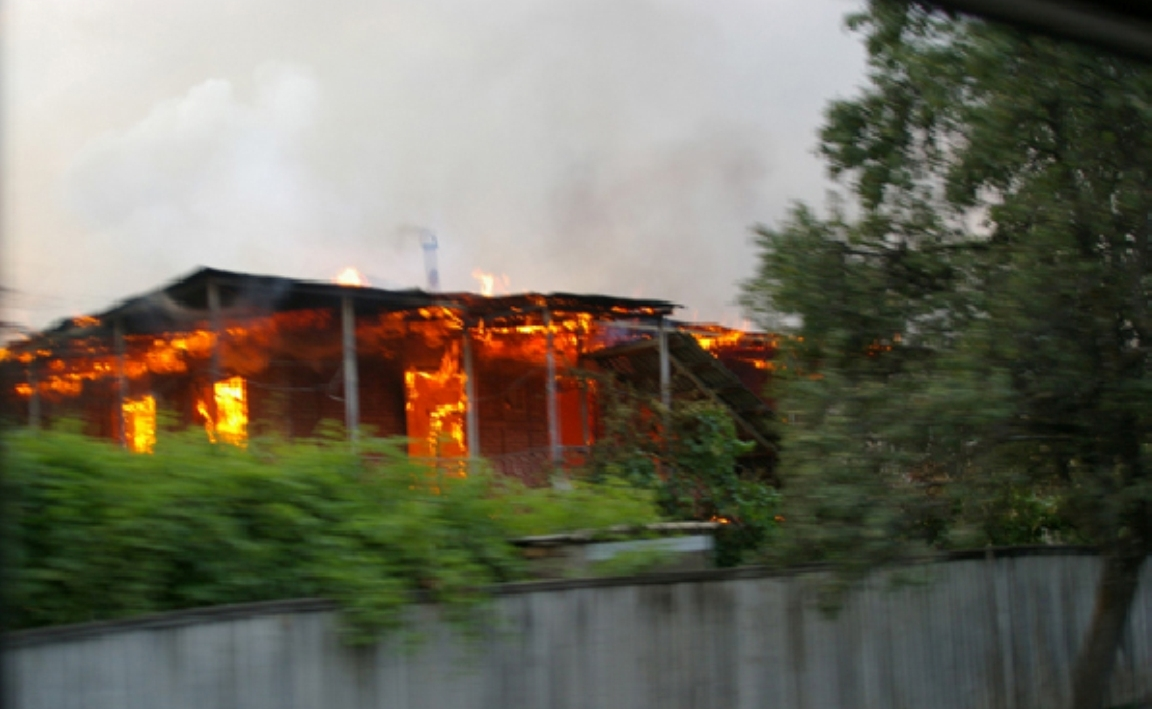
A burning house in the Georgian village of Kekhvi, on the road from Tskhinvali to Java.

On 12 August 2008, fires and plundering in the abandoned ethnic Georgian settlements were seen by Associated Press journalists toured by the Russian military through Tskhinvali; while a Russian army officer claimed that the combat had caused some houses to burn for several days, in fact none of the buildings was on fire before the hostilities in Tskhinvali had ended by 11 August. On 12 August, HRW workers in South Ossetia observed at least four ethnic Georgian villages being destroyed. Plunder was also witnessed. A HRW researcher said that the remaining Georgian people there were in "desperate" situation. According to the international law, attacks on civilian property and looting are war crimes. On 13 August, an interviewed South Ossetian officer acknowledged that the South Ossetian forces burned these houses "to make sure that they [the Georgians] can’t come back." HRW also learned from an Ossetian officer about the summary execution of a Georgian combatant, and that the looters, who were "everywhere" in the Georgian villages in South Ossetia, were "now moving to Gori". By 14 August, already after the official ceasefire, many international media outlets reported Georgian government and refugee stories that Ossetian and often also other pro-Russian irregulars (including reports of Cossack and Chechen paramilitaries) were looting and burning Georgian villages in South Ossetia and near Gori. There was looting in the town of Gori.

On 13 August, Russian interior minister Rashid Nurgaliev promised that Russia would adopt a firm stance on looting; according to Russia's Interfax, firing squad shot two marauders in South Ossetia. Nevertheless, on 14 August, The Daily Telegraph reporter witnessed looting around Gori by South Ossetian militias. Russian forces mostly endorsed looting, with one Russian officer yelling to "take whatever you want". Vehicles were even carjacked from the international officials by paramilitaries while Russian soldiers observed. According to HRW, the road linking Tskhinvali to Java had been closed by Russian forces as anti-plunder measure on 13 August, and HRW investigators did not detect fires there by 14 August while Georgia's Gori Municipality settlements were still being plundered. Russian Major General Vyacheslav Borisov was quoted as saying that Ossetian marauders were slaughtering "poor" Georgians and Russian forces would punish those responsible for such crimes. South Ossetian leader Eduard Kokoity admitted in an interview with Kommersant that there was looting in the Georgian villages. However, he added that "this is a consequence of any war."

On 18 August, journalists working for The New York Times visited the Georgian villages located between Gori and Tskhinvali and witnessed the situation indicating "ethnic anger and a sustained, often unchecked period of looting." The plundering and burning of Georgian villages in South Ossetia continued in late August, with an AP reporter witnessing ravage of Georgian properties in at least six settlements from 22 August through 28 August. It was also reported that according to South Ossetian official David Sanakoev, ethnic Georgian civilians in South Ossetia were "detained for their own protection" and were expelled to the Georgian side. One South Ossetian militiaman was quoted as saying: "This is not looting, this is trophies." On 25 August 2008, reporter for Novaya Gazeta witnessed how the militants were razing the burned Georgian houses in the Georgian villages of Tamarasheni, Kvemo Achabeti, Zemo Achabeti and Kurta within South Ossetia. Russian tour guide told foreign journalists that "Georgian special commandos burned the houses." The Times reporter described the Georgian villages in the "buffer zone" as "ghost towns" in September 2008. The reporter could not find neither humans nor the livestock in one Georgian village and witnessed that not a single building had been spared from arson attacks. The few last Georgian civilians told The Times on 1 September that Russian military was now denying South Ossetian irregulars entry into the "buffer zone". Anna Neistat of HRW stated in early September that marauding was continuing in the Georgian villages located in the uncontrolled buffer zone between Gori and South Ossetia. Journalist for International Herald Tribune observed in early September that large vehicles had been crashed into some robbed structures in the Russian-occupied Georgian villages near South Ossetia. Journalist observed that Russian military had not allowed the OSCE into the "security zone" because Russian military was not "eager for witnesses to view the results of the destruction they have promoted."

On 27 August 2008, Human Rights Watch used the UNOSAT satellite images to prove the rampant arson of ethnic-Georgian villages by Ossetian militia in South Ossetia. According to witnesses, Russian tanks attacked Georgian houses in Tamarasheni on 10 August.

The Georgian town of Akhalgori, now controlled and annexed by the South Ossetian authorities, was spared from plunder and razing.

=== Abuse of civilians ===
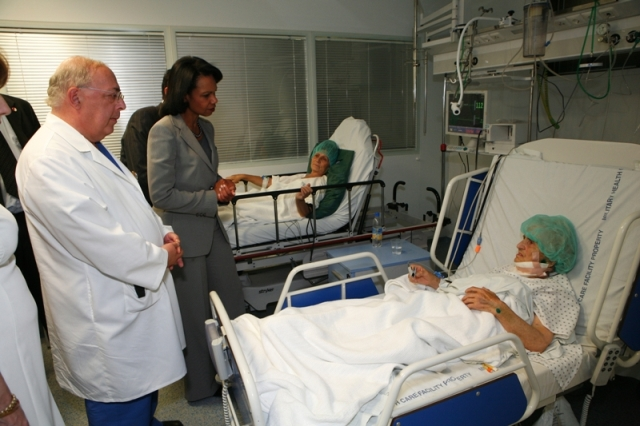
Secretary of State Condoleezza Rice in the Tbilisi Central Hospital, meeting with injured from Gori

Some of the emerging stories featured reports of atrocities. On 14 August, BBC News said that it was "difficult to verify" such "consistent" reports due to Russian control of the area. The new waves of Georgian refugees bringing reports of the widespread pillage and "revenge" killings in the territories occupied by the Russian forces kept coming over the next days. Reporters witnessed armed looters, but Russian forces did not prevent them from pillaging. Civilian victims asserted that the Russian army stood by as the militias were abusing civilians and pillaging. Russian forces did not try to curb the militias. According to witnesses, rape of women also took place. British journalists wrote: "The militia gangs were part of a murderous wave unleashed by Russia last week on Georgian civilians."

On 16 August, an Associated Press reporter witnessed groups of Georgian forced laborers in Tskhinvali under armed guard of Ossetians and Russians; South Ossetia's interior minister Mikhail Mindzaev acknowledged this, saying that the Georgians "are cleaning up after themselves". Russian military officer said he would detain an AP photographer in case of photoshooting. The Independent reported that around 40 Georgian civilian hostages, mostly elderly men, were marched in Tskhinvali and mistreated by South Ossetians. On 18 August, South Ossetian leaders put the number of the hostages at more than 130, about half of them females and mostly former Georgian workers. The Article 3 of the Fourth Geneva Convention prohibits the military to capture non-combatant population.

On 16 August, HRW appealed to Russian officials to halt Ossetian reprisals against Georgians in the Gori district and for the Russian army to guarantee freedom of movement for civilians evacuating the area and the operation of humanitarian aid agencies. Human Rights Watch (HRW) reported that following Russian takeover of Georgian areas, Georgians from Gori and the adjacent villages reported South Ossetian militias pillaging and assaulting Georgian properties as well as abducting civilians; however, after finding out about Ossetian assaults on those who did escape, the Georgians did not dare to leave. Russian forces turned back some humanitarian aid expeditions trying to help civilians, with only the United Nations (UN) managing to bring limited food provisions to the city. The humanitarian conditions in Gori by 16 August was assessed as "desperate" by the United Nations.

Russian (Novaya Gazeta) and British (The Sunday Times) journalists embedded with the Russian and Ossetian forces reported that irregulars were abusing and executing captured Georgian soldiers and suspected combatants captured during the "mopping-up operation" in South Ossetia and beyond.

== Reactions and assessments ==
=== August 2008 ===
Georgian president Mikheil Saakashvili said on 11 August that 90% of killed Georgians were civilians.

The Red Cross stated on 12 August that it was "still too early" to state the exact number of casualties, with deputy director of operations Dominik Stillhart saying that they had to cope with a large number of killed and injured people.

On 12 August, Georgia submitted a lawsuit with the International Court of Justice, accusing Russia of carrying out ethnic cleansing between 1993 and 2008.

Aslambek Apayev of Helsinki Group said on 15 August that "If Moscow considers that Saakashvili should stand before the Hague tribunal, then let it first send [to that court] Putin and his generals who are guilty in the mass murder of peaceful residents on the territory of the Chechen Republic."

According to an 18 August report by Human Rights Watch (HRW), Georgian forces employed unnecessarily excess force in the beginning of the conflict. Russia deliberately attacked fleeing civilians in South Ossetia and the Gori district of Georgia. Russian warplanes bombed civilian population centres in Georgia proper and villages of ethnic Georgians in South Ossetia. Armed militias engaged in plundering, burning and kidnappings. Attacks by militias compelled Georgian civilians to run away. HRW said the conflict was a civilian disaster and called for international organisations to send fact-finding missions to the area of conflict. It also asked for the officials to hold people responsible for any wrongdoing accountable. HRW found out in the Ossetian village of Khetagurovo that some Georgian troops did not know that civilians had not left Khetagurovo. HRW noted that there were no complaints by Khetagurovo residents about mistreatment by Georgian troops, who were checking for militants and weapons.

Don Cossack was quoted as saying on 19 August 2008 that many "thugs" from Southern Russia had gone to Georgia as volunteers and they were responsible for marauding the toilet seats in Gori.

The International Committee of the Red Cross managed to enter South Ossetia by 21 August. Georgian authorities reported that the Georgian casualties in Georgia proper were 215 killed and 1400 injured.

On 26 August 2008, French Foreign Minister Bernard Kouchner declared that the Russian forces were going to ethnically cleanse all Georgians in Akhalgori during the night of 27 August.

On 28 August 2008, German Foreign Minister Frank-Walter Steinmeier stated that Russia and South Ossetia had to confirm the atrocities committed in South Ossetia and urged Russia to agree to the international investigation.

=== September 2008 ===
Russian journalist Elena Milashina was told by the Investigative Committee of Russia in the Southern Federal District that the Russian investigators had been working for 3 weeks, but still did not manage to increase the South Ossetian death toll of 132 to the detriment of Eduard Kokoity and the Russian Foreign Ministry and that the vast majority of the casualties were militants.

On 5 September 2008, the first international delegation consisting of pro-Russian Members of Parliament visited Tskhinvali on a journey organised by the Russian Duma. The Latvian Nikolay Kabanov said he found the destruction greater than he anticipated. Lubomír Zaorálek, Deputy Chairman of the Chamber of Deputies of the Czech Republic stated that he "did not understand the military purpose of the action." The Bulgarian MP Petar Kanev, chairman of the group for Bulgarian-Russian Friendship in the National Assembly, claimed that he did not see any military object hit by the Georgian army.

On 5 September 2008, the ambassadors of Sweden, Latvia and Estonia attempted to visit Russian-occupied Georgian villages near South Ossetia on September 5 with the purpose of delivering aid and evaluation of the humanitarian situation in the area. But the ambassadors were unable to carry out their mission because they were stopped at Russian checkpoints in violation of the Vienna Convention on diplomatic relations and the ceasefire agreement. On 8 September, international aid missions were barred from entering Georgian villages.

On 8 September Council of Europe Commissioner for Human Rights Thomas Hammarberg issued a report, "Human Rights in Areas Affected by the South Ossetia Conflict", stating that during the conflict "a very large number of people had been victimised. More than half of the population in South Ossetia fled, the overwhelming majority of them after the Georgian artillery and tank attack on Tskhinvali and the assaults on Georgian villages by South Ossetian militia and criminal gangs." The report said that rockets struck the main Tskhinvali hospital, some residential areas in Tskhinvali were "completely destroyed" and "the main building of the Russian peace keeping force as well as the base's medical dispensary had been hit by heavy artillery." South Ossetian militia and criminals had razed villages with ethnic-Georgian majorities between Tskhinvali and Java . The use of M85S cluster bombs by the Georgians and RBK 250 cluster bombs by the Russians resulted in civilian casualties. Georgia was reported to have used cluster munitions twice to hit civilians fleeing via the main escape road and admitted using cluster bombs against Russian troops and near the Roki Tunnel. Hammarberg voiced his concern about the security situation in the Russian-controlled "buffer zone" between Tskhinvali and Karaleti.

On 9 September, the BBC reported, "now the Ossetians are making sure [Georgians] will never return." According to the BBC, South Ossetian and Russian allegations of perpetration of genocide "now seem wildly exaggerated."

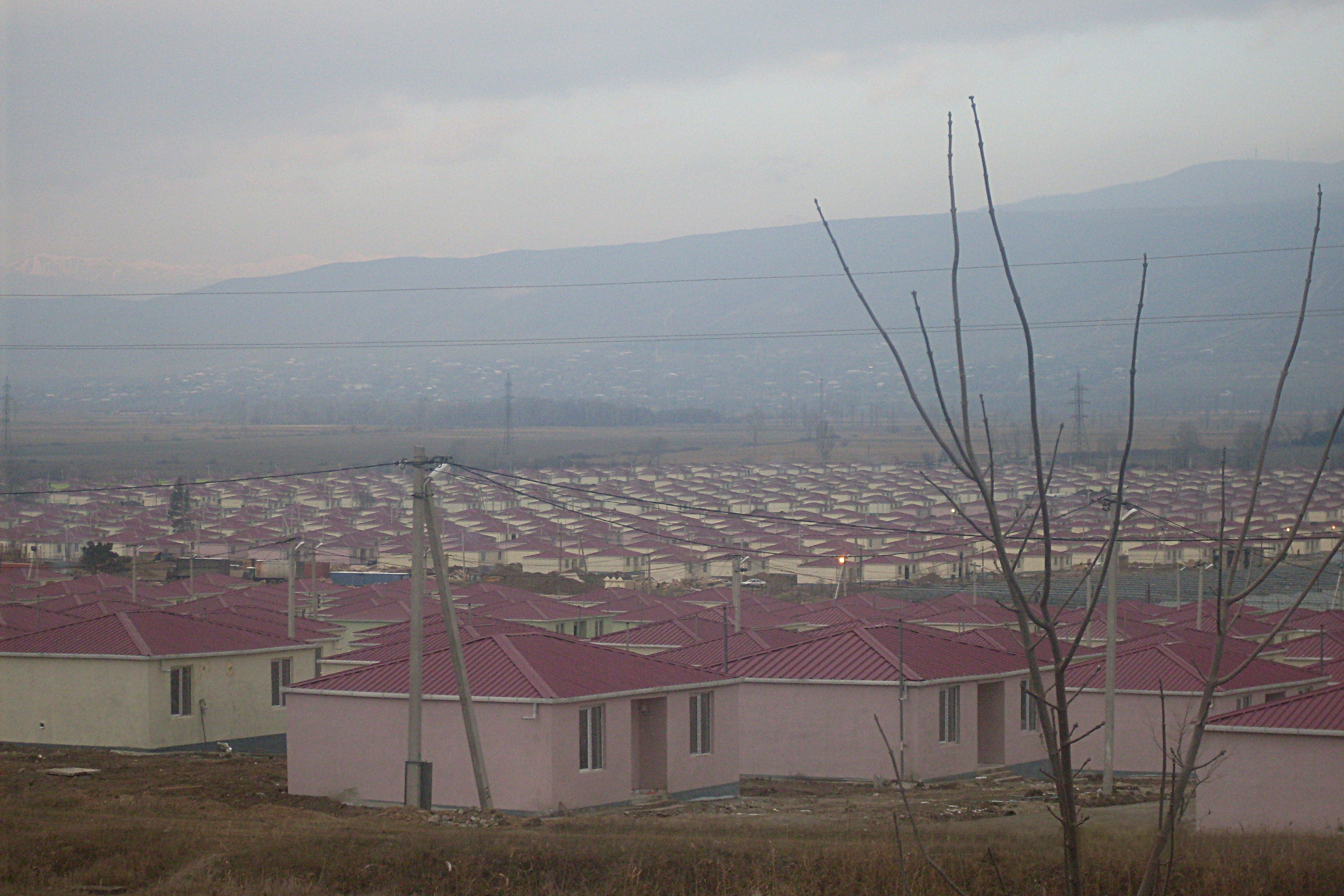
Tserovani, one of the villages built by the Georgian government for IDPs from the conflict zone

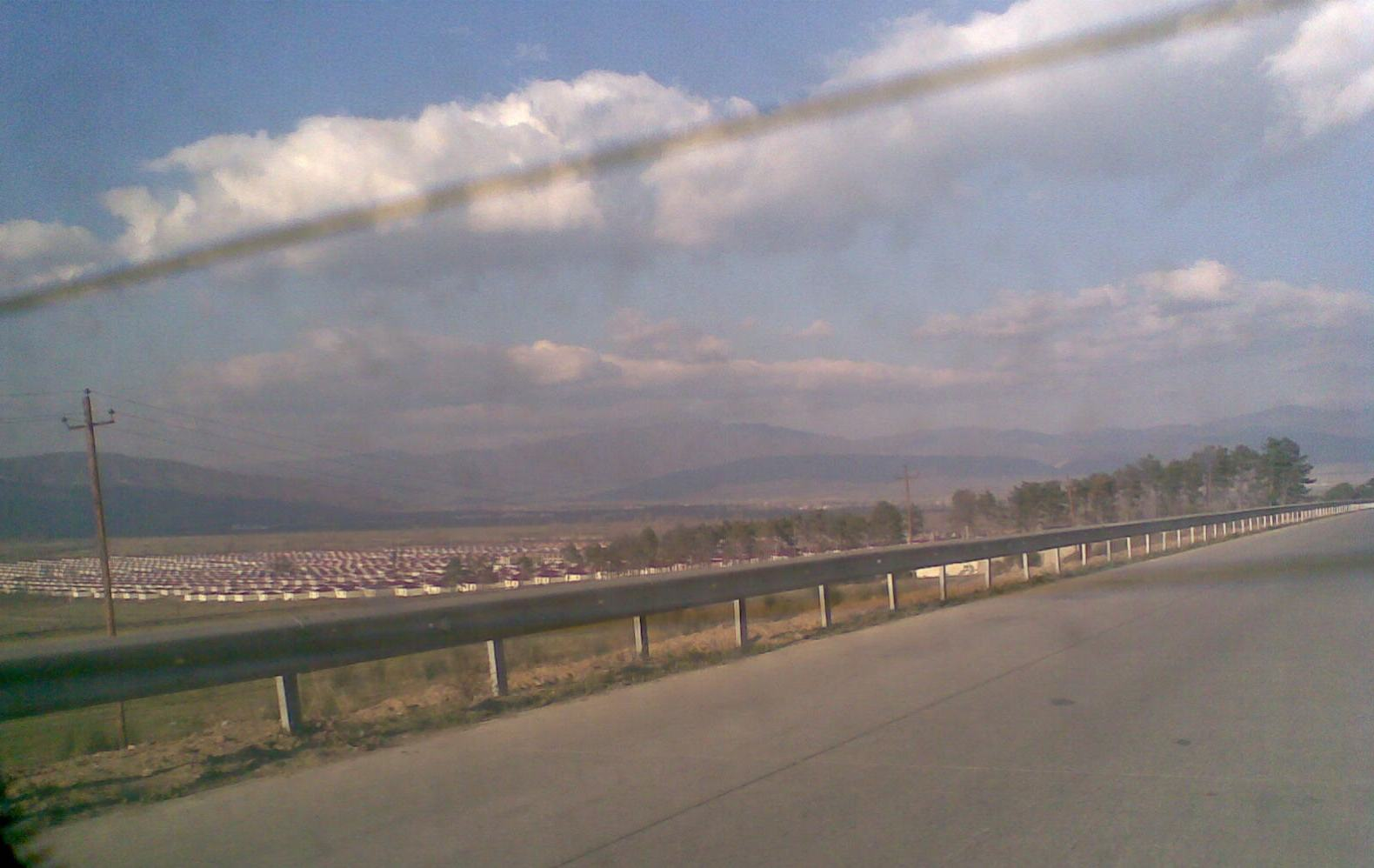
Tserovani, a settlement built by the Georgian government for refugees.

On 10 September 2008, Novaya Gazeta reported that its correspondent witnessed the remains of the Russian ballistic missile in the corn field in the village of Sinaguri.

On 11 September 2008, Human Rights Watch researcher Tatyana Lokshina said that the civilian casualties of the war were seemingly "fewer than 100" and that South Ossetian claims of 1,500 civilian casualties probably contained militiamen and some injured civilians.

On 11 September 2008, Memorial reported that the villages of Kekhvi, Kurta, Achabeti, Tamarasheni, Eredvi, Vanati and Avnevi were "virtually fully burnt down". Neither South Ossetian authorities nor Russian forces did not protect the Georgian properties and civilians. Memorial said that it was "impossible" to verify the South Ossetian allegations of "thousands of killed" and also reported that "we learnt that most of the killed were the representatives of armed resistance."

On 15 September 208, Human Rights Watch called for unimpeded access to the so-called "security zone" near South Ossetia for the EU mission. The Georgian police was barred from entering the villages in the Gori area. Uprooted Georgian civilians could not return to the area either due to destroyed homes or out of fear. New wave of the burning of Georgian homes had begun in South Ossetia.

On 18 September 2008, Taymuraz Khugaev, Prosecutor General of South Ossetia, claimed that Georgian marauders were looting the Georgian villages near South Ossetia and that the Georgian villages inside South Ossetia were still standing undamaged.

On 21 September 2008, HRW published a report on abuse of captive Georgian servicemen.

Member of the Parliamentary Assembly of the Council of Europe Luc Van den Brande said on 25 September 2008 that there had been no genocide in South Ossetia.

=== Rest of 2008 ===
On 2 October 2008, Resolution 1633 of the Parliamentary Assembly of the Council of Europe (PACE) confirmed that Georgian army used cluster munitions, saying "[t]he use of heavy weapons and cluster munitions, creating grave risks for civilians, constituted a disproportionate use of armed force by Georgia, albeit within its own territory, and as such a violation of international humanitarian law". The Assembly stated that "differences about the role of EU monitors in the so-called “buffer zone” may lead to an even further deterioration of the security situation in this area".

On 9 October 2008, an analysis of satellite images of the conflict zone was published which demonstrated that during the Russian capture of the area, the burning of numerous houses in Georgian villages had taken place from 10 August to 19 August 2008. Amnesty International noted that the Russo-Georgian battle in Tskhinvali during the war had possibly resulted in most damage of the city by the end of large-scale conflict by 10 August; however, Georgian villages near Tskhinvali were damaged after the war.

On 10 October 2008, HRW reported that Grad and BM-27 Uragan rockets were used by Russian military in areas populated by civilians.

On 15 October 2008, the International Court of Justice called on both Georgia and Russia to refrain from racial discrimination and provide humanitarian assistance.

In late October 2008, the BBC reported that according to the Ossetians, Georgian troops could have perpetrated war crimes during the battle of Tskhinvali, such as possible intentional attacks on civilians. BBC witnessed proof of the organised destruction of Georgian villages in South Ossetia. BBC interviewed one of the South Ossetian combatants who gave a tip on arson.

On 16 November 2008, Oleg Orlov, chairman of the Memorial organization, said that South Ossetian forces violated human rights during the war. Russian forces sometimes protected the civilians, however, they did not actively curb marauding even after multiple requests by Catholicos-Patriarch of All Georgia Ilia II of Georgia and local Georgian archbishop. He confirmed that the Georgian villages in South Ossetia were deliberately burned. He said that some marauders were women and some Georgian residents were killed if they resisted robbing. After the Russian withdrawal from the buffer zone on 9 October 2008, marauding and attacks on civilians continued in the Georgian villages bordering South Ossetia. More than 2,000 Georgians had already left the occupied Akhalgori district due to pressure and the military commandant of the Russian troops in South Ossetia confirmed that the South Ossetian separatists had an intention to expel the Georgian population.

Chairman of the Union of South Ossetian journalists Batradz Kharebov told Echo of Abkhazia in November 2008 that according to his calculations, only 70 people died in Tskhinvali.

In November 2008, Amnesty International released a 69-page report detailing serious international-law violations by Georgia and Russia. The Amnesty representative commented on the "buffer zone" that the "twilight zone" had appeared near the borders of South Ossetia. In response to the report, Russian foreign ministry official Igor Lyakin-Frolov suggested that it was "too late" to conduct an investigation into violations of the humanitarian law.

In November 2008, HRW reported on the humanitarian situation in Akhalgori. Deputy director of the Moscow office of HRW, Tanya Lokshina, said: "South Ossetian militias are running wild attacking ethnic Georgians in Akhalgori."

In December 2008, Novaya Gazeta journalist reported that ISU-152 artillery had been deployed on the Zar road before August 2008 in violation of the Dagomys agreement. During the war, Georgia opened the humanitarian corridor on the Zar road and fleeing South Ossetian civilians were caught in the artillery duel between Georgian and Ossetian forces in Java.

In December 2008, former Secretary of the South Ossetian Security Council Anatoly Barankevich told Kommersant that president Eduard Kokoity personally beat the captive Georgian prisoner of war.

Thomas Hammarberg reported in early September 2008 that 133 confirmed deaths was received by the commissioner from Russian authorities. Russian authorities initially claimed that up to 2,000 ethnic Ossetian civilians of Tskhinvali were killed by Georgian forces; according to Russia, the reason for the Russian involvement in the conflict in Georgia was this large number of fatalities. Public opinion among Ossetians was impacted by claims of high casualties; according to HRW, some Ossetian civilians said in interviews that they approved of burning and pillaging of Georgian villages because of the "thousands of civilian casualties in South Ossetia" announced by Russian television. In December 2008, the figures were revised down to a total of 162 South Ossetian casualties by the Investigative Committee of the Prosecutor's Office of the Russian Federation. However, it is not known whether the Investigative Committee of the Prosecutor's Office of the Russian Federation discerned militiamen from civilians. The Public Investigation Commission on War Crimes in South Ossetia counted 365 civilian deaths as of 8 November 2008, but the representative of the Public Investigation Commission on War Crimes in South Ossetia stated that the commission did not separate militiamen from civilian victims of the war.

Georgia and South Ossetia have filed complaints about alleged war crimes committed by the other side with international courts, including the International Criminal Court, the International Court of Justice, and the European Court of Human Rights.

=== Up in flames ===
In January 2009, Human Rights Watch (HRW) stated that all parties to the war seriously breached international laws governing war and caused many fatalities among civilians. HRW, summarizing its findings, said: "Which party started the conflict has no bearing on parties' obligations to adhere to international humanitarian and human rights law and to hold violators accountable."

HRW reported that no proof of intentional attacks on non-combatants by Georgian troops had been discovered. Georgian forces used Grad multiple rocket launchers, self-propelled artillery, mortars and howitzers against South Ossetian targets during the initial phase of the conflict. The South Ossetian parliament and several schools and nurseries were used as military posts by South Ossetian troops and volunteer militias and targeted by Georgian artillery fire. Georgia stated that its strikes only intended to "neutralize firing positions from where Georgian positions were being targeted". HRW documented witness accounts of the usage of civilian objects by South Ossetian fighters. Such usage made civilian objects permissible military aims, and HRW concluded that South Ossetian fighters put non-combatant population at risk by setting up military positions near or in civilian structures. Georgia was responsible for the indiscriminate use of force by using inaccurate weapons to target military targets in civilian areas. HRW noted that many civilians had left Tskhinvali before 7 August 2008. HRW reported that no charges of mistreatment by Georgian troops were leveled by most South Ossetian residents and Georgian forces were seemingly checking only for militants.

HRW commented on the conduct of war by Russia that Russian attacks, carried out with bombers and artillery, killed or wounded civilians in Georgia, including areas outside of South Ossetia. HRW said that it was possible that Russians carried out intentional attacks on civilian targets in Georgia. HRW found out that there were some possibly deliberate attacks on civilian cars by Russian military and found evidence of Russian tanks attacking civilian buildings. HRW further stated that Russia's massive failure to safeguard law and security in South Ossetia under its obligation as an occupying power enabled South Ossetians to massively attack Georgian properties and civilians.

HRW also documented South Ossetian multiple breaches of humanitarian law and ethnic cleansing of Georgians, stating that South Ossetian forces and militias destroyed those villages in South Ossetia loyal to the government of Georgia in an organized way and assaulted the villagers present there. HRW noted that Russian military took part in the extensive marauding of Georgian villages and seemingly safeguarded South Ossetians during the campaign against Georgian villages. HRW concluded that the aim of the South Ossetian actions during the war was an ethnic cleansing. Russian advance into undisputed Georgia from South Ossetia was trailed by South Ossetian forces, who began attacking Georgian civilians and homes in undisputed Georgia.

=== 2009-2012 ===
In June 2009, Russian president Dmitry Medvedev claimed that Georgia was responsible for the death of Dutch cameraman Stan Storimans.

In August 2009, Russian journalist Yuriy Snegirev, traveling from the Roki Tunnel to Tskhinvali, saw the Georgian villages north of Tskhinvali, which had been "a showcase of Georgian democracy" before the war. He wrote for Izvestia, "Now showcase is shattered. From splendor only asphalt has remained. The villages no longer exist."

Nearly one year after the conflict, more than 400 deaths in the war had been confirmed by Georgia.

German Stern magazine published the account of the Georgian soldier, who was tortured during his imprisonment by South Ossetians.

Dutch journalist Jeroen Akkermans, who had been injured in Gori in August 2008, submitted a lawsuit against Russia to the European Court of Human Rights.

South Ossetian opposition reported in August 2009 that the residents of South Ossetia were scavenging the construction materials and fruits in the abandoned Georgian villages north of Tskhinvali.

In September 2009, the EU commission said it was likely that during the hostilities and in the aftermath of the war, an ethnic cleansing of Georgians was committed in South Ossetia.

Walter Kälin, the Representative of the United Nations' Secretary-General on the Human Rights of Internally Displaced Persons, visited South Ossetia on 5–6 November 2009. He called for the return of all displaced persons and refugees to South Ossetia. He noted that the reconstruction work was slow and part of the South Ossetian population did not have shelter.

In 2009, Open Society Georgia Foundation published the report on atrocities committed during August–September 2008, where the Georgian witnesses' accounts were included.

In April 2010, Georgia submitted a claim to the European Court of Human Rights on behalf of the family of Giorgi Antsukhelidze, a Georgian soldier who died in captivity and a subject of internet videos showing his torture at the hand of South Ossetian militias.

In 2012, an article published by Georgia Online accused Moscow of planning the genocide of South Ossetians. It stated:

Although the 58th division of Russian Army by then had already spent two days in Java, as Ossetian sources say, the army did not take any actions. There are questions, in particular, Alan Chochiev, the chairman of the Popular Front of South Ossetia "Adamon Nykhas" puts forward the following question: if genocide was taking place, why didn’t the president of Russia order the 58th Army to prevent the tragedy, and only on 10th of August, Medvedev began to be indignant about the "massive civilian casualties among population", which "has risen to two thousand people." It looks like the Russian President and the Prime Minister were playing for time and waited until the number of victims reached 2000, to qualify the incident as genocide and accuse Georgia, more precisely President Saakashvili, in crimes against the civilian population and to request the Hague Tribunal for him."

=== International Criminal Court investigation ===
In October 2015, the Prosecutor of the International Criminal Court Fatou Bensouda stated that the expulsion of ethnic Georgians from South Ossetia had been planned and called upon the court to investigate the war crimes. Bensouda said she possessed proof that peacekeepers had been killed by both Georgians and Ossetians. Justice Minister of Georgia Tea Tsulukiani said that Georgia was cooperating with Bensouda. The International Criminal Court started an official investigation in February 2016, which was the court's first investigation outside Africa.

On 10 March 2022, the ICC chief prosecutor Karim Ahmad Khan requested warrants of arrest of South Ossetian officials on the charges of abuse of ethnic Georgian civilians.

The International Criminal Court concluded its investigation in the Situation in Georgia in December 2022, delivering arrest warrants for three de facto South Ossetian officials believed to bear responsibility for war crimes committed during the 2008 war — Mikhail Mindzaev, Gamlet Guchmazov and David Sanakoev, respectively, holding the positions of Minister of Internal Affairs, head of a detention centre in Tskhinvali, and Presidential Representative for Human Rights of South Ossetia, at the relevant time. The fourth suspect, Russian general Vyacheslav Borisov, was not indicted as he had died in 2021.

=== European Court of Human Rights ===
Georgia started a series of legal battles to hold Russia accountable for the 2008 conflict. In the 2021 Georgia v. Russia (II) judgment, the European Court of Human Rights ruled that the European Convention on Human Rights does not apply to extraterritorial actions during the active, chaotic phase of a military conflict. However, the Court held Russia responsible for widespread human rights violations committed during the subsequent occupation phase, asserting that Russia exercised effective control over the territory. On 14 October 2025, the European Court of Human Rights ordered Russia to pay Georgia more than 250 million euros ($289,000,000) for violations committed following the war. On 23 June 2026, the European Court of Human Rights ruled Russia liable for the torture and unlawful deaths of eight Georgian prisoners of war during the 2008 conflict, including national hero Giorgi Antsukhelidze, establishing Russian jurisdiction and responsibility over South Ossetian forces despite Moscow's legislative refusal to execute the monetary judgments.

== See also ==
- Humanitarian impacts of the Russian invasion of Ukraine
