= Ethnic cleansing of Georgians in South Ossetia =

2008 removal and flight of Georgians from South Ossetia

- Part of Russia–Georgia war
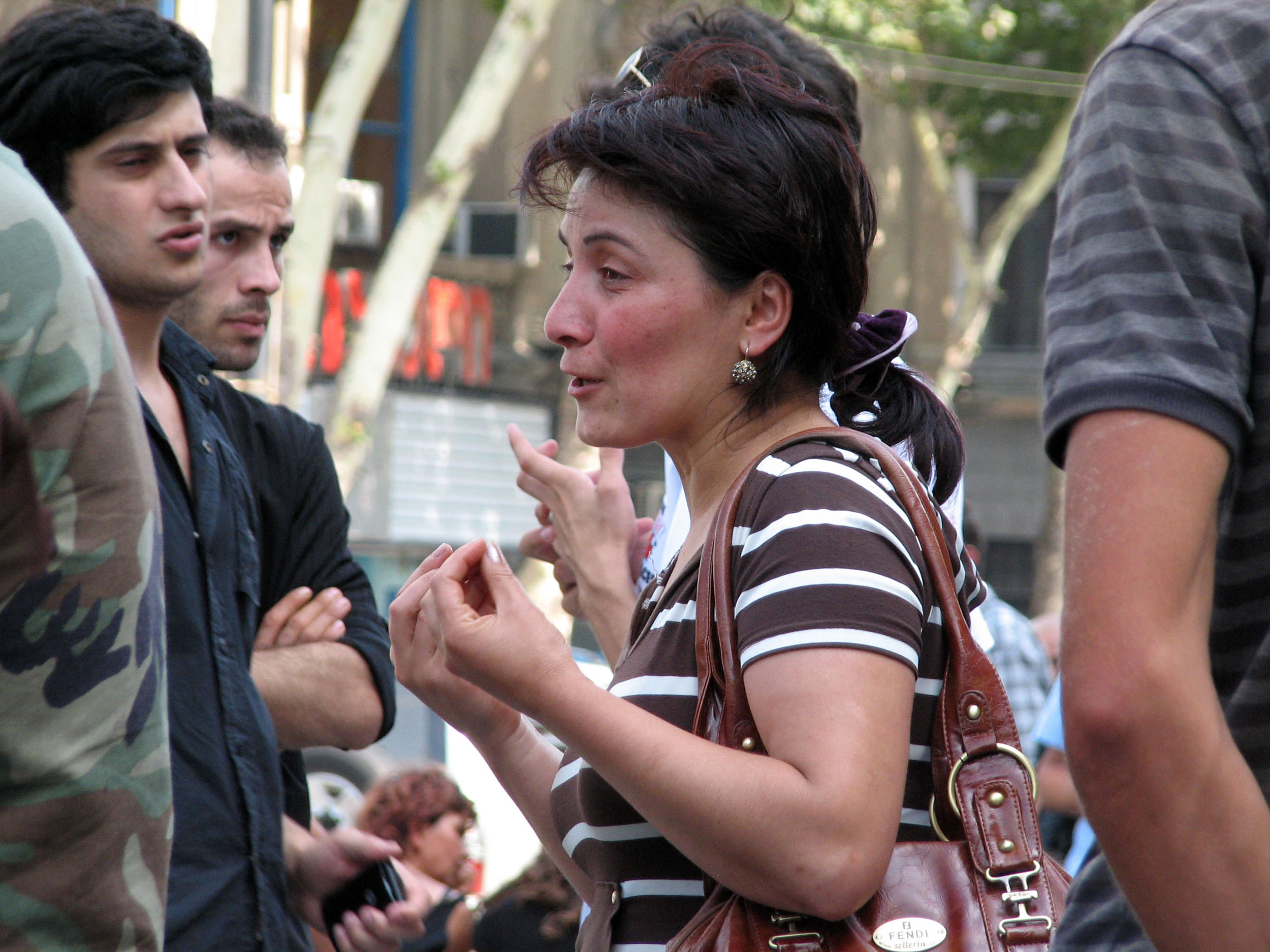
- Georgian refugees from South Ossetia in Tbilisi, 10 August 2008
- Location: South Ossetia
- Date: 2008
- Target: Ethnic Georgians
- Attack type: Ethnic cleansing, forced displacement, war crimes, mass murder
- Deaths: At least 16 civilians
- Victim: At least 20,000 Georgians forcibly displaced from South Ossetia
- Perpetrators: Russian Armed Forces; Armed Forces of South Ossetia

Ethnic cleansing of Georgians in South Ossetia was a mass expulsion of ethnic Georgians conducted in South Ossetia and other territories occupied by Russian and South Ossetian forces, which happened during and after the 2008 Russia–Georgia war. Overall, at least 20,000 Georgians were forcibly displaced from South Ossetia. The overall aim of the ethnic cleansing campaign was to establish mono-ethnic South Ossetia in which Georgians would no longer exist.

Human Rights Watch concluded that the "South Ossetian forces sought to ethnically cleanse" the Georgian-populated areas. In 2009, the Parliamentary Assembly of the Council of Europe resolutions condemned "the ethnic cleansing and other human rights violations in South Ossetia, as well as the failure of Russia and the de facto authorities to bring these practices to a halt and their perpetrators to justice". According to the September 2009 report of the European Union-sponsored Independent International Fact-Finding Mission on the Conflict in Georgia, "several elements suggest the conclusion that ethnic cleansing was carried out against ethnic Georgians in South Ossetia both during and after the August 2008 conflict."

Of the 192,000 people displaced in the 2008 war, 127,000 were displaced in Georgia proper, 30,000 within South Ossetia, and another 35,000 fled to North Ossetia. According to the 2016 census conducted by the South Ossetian authorities, 3,966 ethnic Georgians remained in the breakaway territory, constituting 7% of the region's total population of 53,532.

== Perpetrators ==
The policy of ethnic cleansing was affirmed by the president of South Ossetia, Eduard Kokoity, who in his interview of 15 August 2008 given to the Russian publication Kommersant, on the question "Will Georgian civilians be allowed to return?" gave the following answer: "We do not intend to let anybody in here anymore".

The Economist also quoted a South Ossetian intelligence officer on 22 August as follows: "We burned these houses. We want to make sure that they [the Georgians] can't come back, because if they do come back, this will be a Georgian enclave again and this should not happen".

The Times reported from Gori on 18 August 2008 that Russian troops had reportedly told Georgian civilians fleeing South Ossetia: "Putin has given us an order that everyone must be either shot or forced to leave".

== Ethnic cleansing ==
According to Rachel Denber, Europe and Central Asia director at Human Rights Watch, "Instead of protecting civilians, Russian forces allowed South Ossetian forces who followed in their path to engage in wanton and wide-scale pillage and burning of Georgian homes and to kill, beat, rape, and threaten civilians." She added that "Such deliberate attacks are war crimes, and if committed as part of a widespread or systematic pattern, they may be prosecuted as a crime against humanity." According to HRW, 15,000 of 17,500 Georgians left South Ossetia before the arrival of Russian forces.

On 25 August 2008, speaking in his capacity as Chairman of the OSCE, Finnish Foreign Minister Alexander Stubb stated that, in Gori district, he had personally witnessed Russian emergency personnel bringing in "two lorries full of elderly people" from South Ossetia who had been "torn away from their homes." He concluded that "they are clearly trying to empty South Ossetia of Georgians."

In October 2008, the Norwegian Helsinki Committee, in cooperation with three other human rights organizations, conducted an investigation that concluded that ethnic cleansing was continuing in the de facto border region between Georgia and South Ossetia. "The Human rights monitors found evidence of the burning of houses, attacks on civilians and forced displacement of the Georgian population as late as Friday 17 October. The material collected describes 16 alleged cases of killings of civilians (excluding deaths resulting from crossfire, bombing and shelling at the time of large scale military operations, and accidents with unexploded ordnance), in areas controlled by Russian forces, many of which seems to be instances of summary executions."

According to Human Rights Watch's January 2009 report on the war in Georgia: "[HRW's] observations on the ground and dozens of interviews conducted led us to conclude that the South Ossetian forces sought to ethnically cleanse this set of Georgian villages: that is, the destruction of the homes in these villages was deliberate, systematic, and carried out on the basis of the ethnic and imputed political affiliations of the residents of these villages, with the express purpose of forcing those who remained to leave and ensuring that no former residents would return... [In undisputed Georgian territory] Beginning with the Russian occupation of Georgia and through the end of September, Ossetian forces, often in the presence of Russian forces, conducted a campaign of deliberate violence against civilians, burning and looting their homes on a wide scale, and committing execution-style killings, rape, abductions, and countless beatings."

== Reactions ==
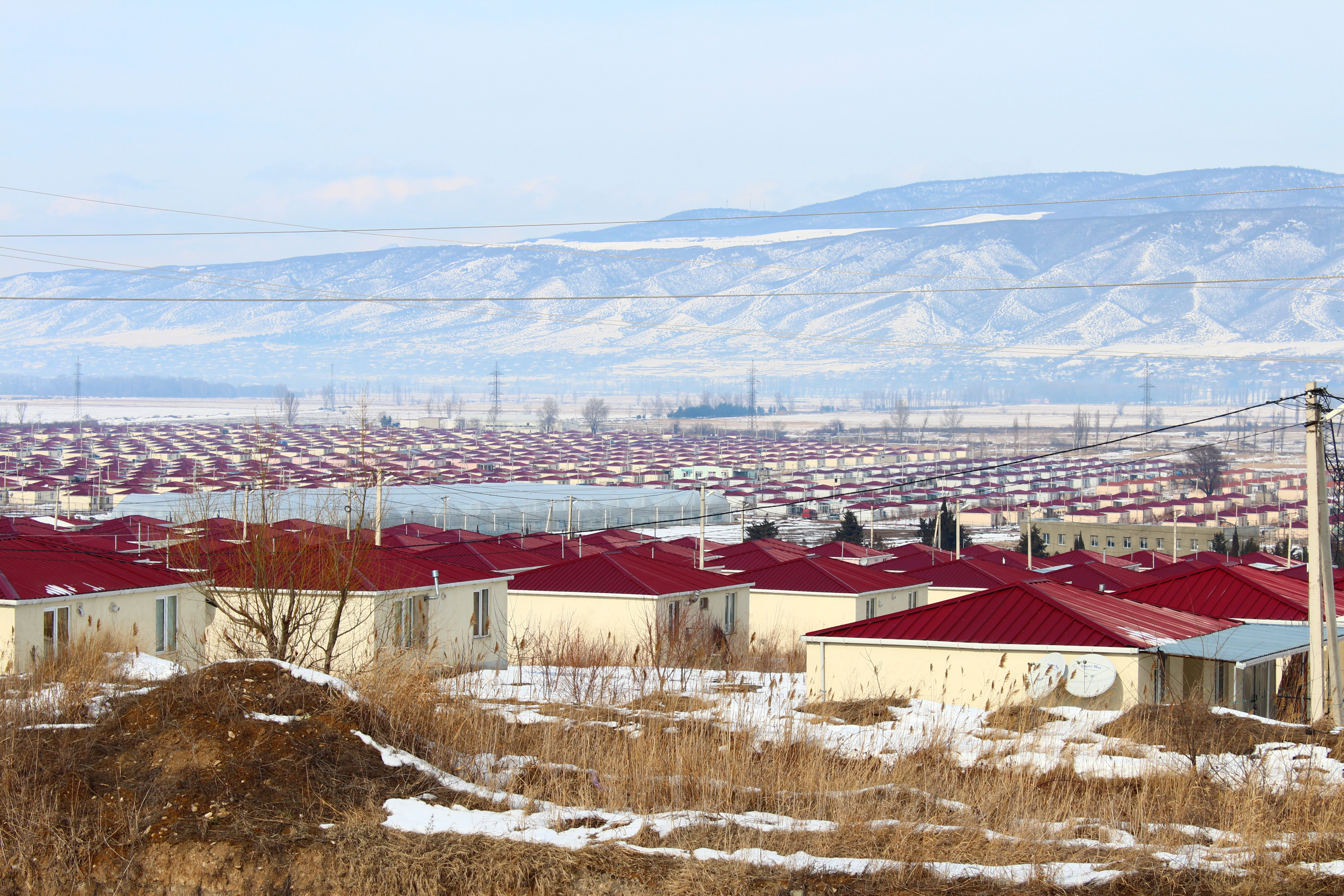
Tserovani is one of the settlements built by the Georgian government for the IDPs from South Ossetia

The Australian paper The Age quoted Major-General Vyacheslav Borisov, the commander in the Russian-occupied city of Gori in their description of the circumstances: "There is growing evidence of looting and "ethnic cleansing" in villages in the area of conflict between Russia and Georgia. The attacks — some witnessed by reporters or documented by a human rights group — include stealing, the burning of homes and possibly killings. Some are ethnically motivated, while at least some of the looting appears to be the work of opportunistic profiteers. The identities of the attackers vary, but a pattern of violence by ethnic Ossetians against ethnic Georgians is emerging and has been confirmed by some Russian authorities. "Now Ossetians are running around and killing poor Georgians in their enclaves," said Major-General Vyacheslav Borisov, the commander in the Russian-occupied city of Gori."

=== International courts ===
Georgia started a series of legal battles to hold Russia accountable for the 2008 conflict. In the 2021 Georgia v. Russia (II) judgment, the European Court of Human Rights ruled that the European Convention on Human Rights does not apply to extraterritorial actions during the active, chaotic phase of a military conflict. However, the Court held Russia responsible for widespread human rights violations committed during the subsequent occupation phase, asserting that Russia exercised effective control over the territory. On 14 October 2025, the European Court of Human Rights ordered Russia to pay Georgia more than 250 million euros ($289,000,000) for violations committed following the war. On 23 June 2026, the European Court of Human Rights ruled Russia liable for the torture and unlawful deaths of eight Georgian prisoners of war during the 2008 conflict, including national hero Giorgi Antsukhelidze, establishing Russian jurisdiction and responsibility over South Ossetian forces despite Moscow's legislative refusal to execute the monetary judgments.

The International Criminal Court concluded its investigation in the Situation in Georgia in December 2022, delivering arrest warrants for three de facto South Ossetian officials believed to bear responsibility for war crimes of unlawful confinement, torture, outrages upon personal dignity, hostage taking, and unlawful transfer of civilians committed during the 2008 war — Mikhail Mindzaev, Gamlet Guchmazov and David Sanakoev, respectively, holding the positions of Minister of Internal Affairs, head of a detention centre in Tskhinvali, and Presidential Representative for Human Rights of South Ossetia, at the relevant time. The fourth suspect, Russian general Vyacheslav Borisov, was not indicted as he had died in 2021.

== See also ==
- Ethnic cleansing of Georgians in Abkhazia
- Humanitarian impact of the Russo-Georgian War
