= Merab Ratishvili =

Merab Ratishvili (born 16 May 1959) is a Georgian businessman, political scientist and author who has been imprisoned in Georgia since 15 July 2008 for his political activities and opposition to the Mikheil Saakashvili government.

== Childhood and education ==
Merab Ratishvili was born in Gori, and educated in Moscow.

== Administrator ==
He is a former Chair of the Organisation for Economic Development and Cooperation, as referenced on the back cover of the English versions of his novels "Juga" and "Iliadi".

== Legal case ==
On 26 October 2007 Merab Ratishvili was arrested in Tbilisi, Georgia and on 15 July 2008 sentenced to 9 years imprisonment, charged with the possession and use of drugs.

Both Georgian and international human rights organisations reported that in their opinion Ratishvili had been arrested because of his support for the political opposition to Mikheil Saakashvili, then President of Georgia.

Merab Ratishvili always maintained his innocence, and his case was submitted to the European Court of Human Rights.

In a 2008 report by the then Public Defender of Human Rights in Georgia Sozar Subari Merab Ratishvili was identified as a political prisoner.

A 2011 report by the Georgian Young Lawyers' Association highlighted Merab Ratishvili's case and concluded that "the preliminary investigation and court review were conducted with both material and procedural violations, meaning that the verdict delivered in Ratishvili's case is unlawful."

In its 2009 report the International Federation for Human Rights (FIDH), stated, "The FIDH fact-finding mission is convinced that Merab Ratishvili is the victim of a purely fabricated, politically motivated case".

In April 2011, Thomas Hammarberg, Commissioner for Human Rights of the Council of Europe, visited Merab Ratishvili in Rustavi prison No.6 as part of a visit to Georgia to report on the administration of justice and level of protection of human rights in the justice system of Georgia.

In November 2012 Ratishvili was one of the first prisoners released by the new Georgian government, which acknowledged he was a political prisoner.

== Author ==
Ratishvili used his time in prison to become a novelist. His first two novels, "Juga" and "Iliadi", have been translated into Russian, English and French. Other works, including another novel, "White Lama", are available in Georgian.
