= Razhden Kuprashvili =

Georgian lawyer and public official, head of the Anti-Corruption Bureau

- რაჟდენ კუპრაშვილი
- Born: March 31, 1983 (age 42); Kutaisi, Georgian SSR
- Occupations: Lawyer, civil servant
- Known for: Head of Georgia’s Anti-Corruption Bureau

Razhden Kuprashvili (რაჟდენ კუპრაშვილი; born 31 March 1983) is a Georgian lawyer and government official who has served as head of Georgia's Anti-Corruption Bureau (ACB). Since 2024–2025, Kuprashvili has been a central figure in the government's escalating repressions against non-governmental organisations (NGOs) and civic groups under amendments to Georgia's “Law on Grants” and the so-called “foreign agents” regime, drawing sustained criticism from domestic and international civil society and international organizations. Kuprashvili is sanctioned by Lithuania using the regime intended to bar foreign individuals involved in gross human rights violations, money laundering, and corruption from entering the country.

== Early life and career ==
Kuprashvili was born in Kutaisi on 31 March 1983 and trained as a lawyer. He served as Director of the State Legal Aid Service from 2019 to 2023 before moving into anti-corruption oversight roles in central government. His asset and income disclosures are catalogued by watchdog databases tracking Georgian public officials.

== Head of the Anti-Corruption Bureau ==
As head of the Anti-Corruption Bureau (ACB), Kuprashvili's office became the focal point for implementation of newly adopted repressive powers over non-profits and civic initiatives in 2025. The Bureau initiated broad blank “monitoring” requests to NGOs for documents and data covering program activities, partners, and finances, citing the amended Law on Grants. On 17 September 2025, the Tbilisi City Court granted the Bureau's motions against several organisations, obliging them to provide extensive information.

== Repressions of civil society ==
As head of the Anti-Corruption Bureau (ACB), Kuprashvili became a central figure in the enforcement of Georgia's 2025 “foreign influence” and “Law on Grants” framework, overseeing investigations and compliance monitoring of non-governmental organisations (NGOs) and civic initiatives. Under his leadership, the Bureau issued broad “monitoring” requests demanding financial and program documentation from dozens of NGOs, often citing the amended Law on Grants and the Law on the Registration of Foreign Agents (GEOFARA). Observers, including domestic and international rights groups, have characterised these measures as part of a wider campaign of political control over civil society. The Bureau's actions—including repeated summons, data seizures, and injunctions—have been described by NGOs such as Transparency International Georgia, GYLA, the Social Justice Center, and WISG as politically motivated and aligned with the ruling party's agenda, while Kuprashvili himself has consistently rejected accusations of overreach, insisting that his office acts strictly within the bounds of Georgian law and constitutional oversight. In media briefings and on social media, he has maintained that the Bureau's requests are legally grounded and aimed at enhancing transparency in foreign-funded political activity.

The Venice Commission, in its Opinion on the Law on the Registration of Foreign Agents, the Amendments to the Law on Grants and Other Laws Relating to “Foreign Influence” (CDL-AD (2025)034, adopted 9–10 October 2025), issued one of the most severe international critiques of the Bureau's role. It found that enforcement under GEOFARA established “a regime of pervasive administrative control comparable in intrusiveness to the Russian ‘foreign agent’ laws,” and that the Bureau possessed “excessive discretion” while lacking “sufficient guarantees of independence and political neutrality.” The Commission warned that empowering the Head of Bureau to seek injunctions and issue regulations without checks “raises concerns about potential regulatory overreach,” and that combining anti-corruption and “foreign influence” mandates risked arbitrary or selective enforcement. It further concluded that oversight by a politically dependent body “cannot be regarded as compatible with the principles of legal certainty and proportionality,” that the cumulative effect of these measures was “coercive, stigmatising, and ultimately inconsistent with democratic pluralism,” and explicitly recommended that GEOFARA and the related grant-approval regime be repealed.

The Venice Commission also highlighted that assigning the Anti-Corruption Bureau as the enforcement authority over GEOFARA was institutionally inappropriate and risked politicising the country's anti-corruption architecture, citing its “lack of independence” and “potential for selective application.” These concerns echoed the findings of the GRECO Fifth Evaluation Round (March 2024), which noted deficiencies in the Bureau's structural independence and safeguards against political influence. Despite the criticism, Kuprashvili and government officials have defended the Bureau as an instrument of transparency ensuring that all organisations receiving foreign support comply with national sovereignty and disclosure laws.

== See also ==
- Civil society in Georgia (country)
- Foreign influence laws
- Georgian Dream
