= International Criminal Court investigation in Georgia =

Situation in Georgia
- The seal of the International Criminal Court
- File no.: 01/15
- Referred by: Pre-Trial Chamber I
- Date referred: 13 October 2015
- Date opened: 27 January 2016
- Incident(s): Russo-Georgian War
- Crimes: War crimes and crimes against humanity:

Status of suspects
- Mikhail Mindzaev: Arrest warrant, at large
- Hamlet Guchmazov: Arrest warrant, at large
- David Sanakoev: Arrest warrant, at large
- Vyacheslav Borisov: Deceased

The International Criminal Court opened a proprio motu investigation in the Situation in Georgia on 27 January 2016 to look into war crimes and crimes against humanity that may have occurred in and around South Ossetia in the context of an international armed conflict between Georgia and Russia between 1 July and 10 October 2008. The investigation phase was announced to have been completed on 16 December 2022. Arrest warrants for crimes committed against Georgian civilians were issued against three high-ranking officials in the Russian-backed South Ossetian government. A fourth suspect, a senior Russian general, was not indicted as he had died in 2021.

== Preliminary examination ==
Georgia is a state party to the Rome Statute of the International Criminal Court (ICC). The Office of the Prosecutor (OTP) of the ICC announced the preliminary examination of the situation in Georgia on 14 August 2008, shortly after a ceasefire agreement was achieved in a conflict that pitted Russia and Russian-backed South Ossetian secessionists against Georgia. The hostilities were accompanied by mutual recriminations of war crimes by all sides involved, including Georgia and several human right groups alleging ethnically-based attacks and forced displacement of Georgian civilians and Russia accusing Georgian forces of attacking Russian troops who had been deployed in the area as peacekeepers under an earlier peace agreement.

In its preliminary examination, the ICC OTP gathered information on alleged crimes attributed to the three parties involved in the armed conflict, specifically crimes that may have occurred in South Ossetia and around it, on the undisputed territory of Georgia temporarily occupied by Russia, such as murder, forcible transfer of population and persecution as well as attacks against the civilian population, willful killing, intentionally directing attacks against peacekeepers, destruction of property and pillaging.

== Investigation ==
On 8 October 2015, the ICC Presidency assigned the Situation in Georgia investigation to Pre-Trial Chamber I, consisting of three judges: Péter Kovács, Reine Alapini-Gansou, and Socorro Flores Liera. The Prosecutor of the ICC Fatou Bensouda submitted a request to the Pre-Trial Chamber for authorisation to open an investigation into the situation on 13 October 2015. On 27 January 2016, Pre-Trial Chamber I granted the Prosecutor's request to open an investigation proprio motu in the situation in Georgia. After several months of active advocacy, the ICC's Registrar visited Georgia and announced the opening of the field office in October 2017. The office was initially heavily undersourced and its work was affected by the lack of experience of the region as well as political turbulences in Georgia.

== Arrest warrants ==
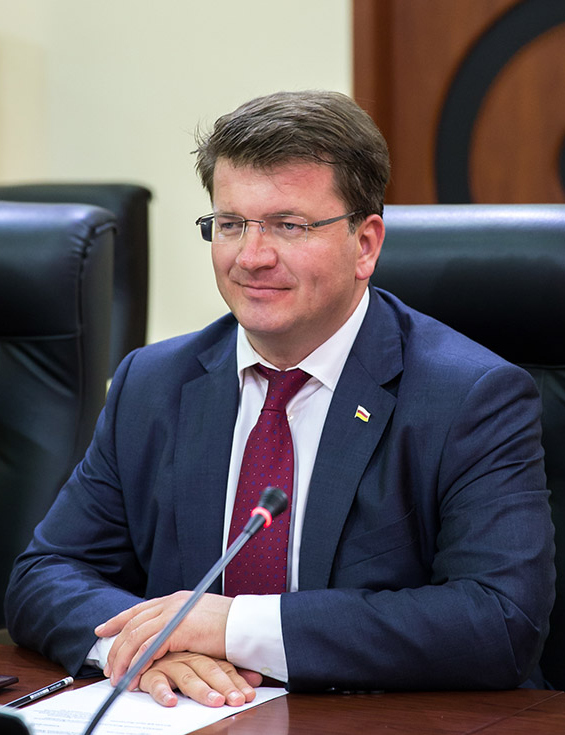
David Sanakoev, one of three ICC indictees for the investigation in Georgia

On 30 June 2022, on the strength of evidence collected during the investigation, the ICC Pre-Trial Chamber delivered arrest warrants for three de facto South Ossetian officials believed to bear responsibility for war crimes committed during the 2008 war — Mikhail Mindzaev, Hamlet Guchmazov and David Sanakoev, respectively, holding the positions of Minister of Internal Affairs, head of a detention centre in Tskhinvali, and Presidential Representative for Human Rights of South Ossetia, at the relevant time.

== Conclusion of investigation phase ==
On 16 December 2022, Karim Ahmad Khan, the Prosecutor of the ICC, announced the conclusion of the six-year investigation phase in the Situation in Georgia. The statement confirmed that the three South Ossetian officials had been indicted for "unlawful confinement, torture, and ill-treatment, hostage taking, and subsequent unlawful transfer of ethnic Georgian civilians in the context of an occupation by the Russian Federation". The three men remained at large at that time. A senior Russian commander, Major General Vyacheslav Borisov, was "believed to have intentionally contributed to the execution of some of [the] crimes", but was not indicted on account of having died. The Prosecutor noted that the mentioned crimes were "representative of a wider pattern of criminality which included the widespread looting and destruction of Georgian villages and homes and the denial of the return of almost all of the Georgian population of the Tskhinvali region".

Karim Ahmad Khan also revealed that due to the lack of any significant change in circumstance the Prosecutor's Office would not pursue new lines of inquiry into the responsibility of other persons or for other conduct within the Situation in Georgia. This was the first time that the Office decided to conclude the investigation phase of the work in relation to a Situation addressed by the Court. The Prosecutor emphasized that the ICC's efforts in Georgia were "far from over" as the individuals subject to arrest warrants had yet to be successfully prosecuted.
