= Hamlet Guchmazov =

South Ossetian war criminal

- Born: July 9, 1976 (age 49); Tskhinvali, South Ossetian AO, Georgian SSR, USSR
- Years active: 2008
- Known for: Head of the Tskhinvali prison ICC indicted war criminal International fugitive

Hamlet Guchmazov (born July 9, 1976) is an indicted Ossetian war criminal from the partially recognized Caucasian Republic of South Ossetia. (Note: All but 6 countries of the United Nations recognize South Ossetia as part of Georgia illegally occupied by Russia.) Guchmazov was indicted by the International Criminal Court for war crimes related to his actions as the head of the Tskhinvali prison.

== Biography ==
Guchmazov was born on July 9, 1976, in the Tskhinvali region.

Guchmazov was named the head of the Tskhinvali prison during the 2008 Russo Georgian war. During which he has been accused of committing crimes against humanity against the Georgian inmates, including; illegal detention, torture and ill-treatment, insulting personal dignity, hostage-taking and illegal displacement of civilians. Guchmazov would be indicted by the International Criminal Court due to these crimes on July 1, 2022. The ICC investigator, Karim Ahmad Khan, stated that the crimes showcased a wider nature of criminal acts, such as mass looting and destruction of Georgian villages, and the denial of the right of Georgians to return to their homes.

At the outbreak of war Guchmazov advocated and pursued the arrest and detention of all ethnic Georgians in the Tskhinvali region, stating that it was to ensure their "safety." Guchmazov was indicted alongside David Sanakoev, the South Ossetian Commissioner for Human Rights, and Mikhail Mindzaev the minister of foreign affairs. Vyacheslav Borisov, a general who had recently died at the time of the indictment, was also investigated, but his charges where dropped with his death. In response to the indictment the government of South Ossetia denounced the ICC as illegitimate, since the court has no jurisdiction on the territory of either Russia or South Ossetia, however, Georgia is a member of the ICC, which all but six members of the United Nation recognize South Ossetia as being illegally occupied by Russia. The South Ossetian government also denounced the ICC as a "tool of the west" accusing it of being anti-Russian.

Shortly after his indictment a grenade was thrown at Guchmazov's house, detonating and destroying his car. Guchmazov was not present at the time of the incident.
