= Georgia v. Russia (II) =

European Court of Human Rights case

Submitted 11 August 2008 Decided 21 January 2021
- Full case name: Case of Georgia v. Russia (II)
- Case: Application no. 38263/08
- ECLI: ECLI:CE:ECHR:2021:0121JUD003826308
- Case type: Inter-State application
- Chamber: Grand Chamber
- Language of proceedings: English / French
- Nationality of parties: Georgia / Russia

Ruling
- Found extraterritorial jurisdiction did not apply to the "active phase of hostilities" during the 2008 war, but did apply during the subsequent "occupation" phase. Found multiple violations by Russia under Articles 2, 3, 5, and 8 of the ECHR, and Article 1 of Protocol No. 1 and Article 2 of Protocol No. 4, alongside a procedural violation of Article 2 for failing to conduct effective investigations.
- President; Robert Spano
- Judges: Linos-Alexandre Sicilianos; Jon Fridrik Kjølbro; Paul Lemmens; Yonko Grozev; Helena Jäderblom; Vincent A. De Gaetano; Ganna Yudkivska; Paulo Pinto de Albuquerque; Helen Keller; Dmitry Dedov; Aleš Pejchal; Krzysztof Wojtyczek; Branko Lubarda; Georges Ravarani; Marko Bošnjak; Lado Chanturia

Instruments cited
- European Convention on Human Rights (Articles 1, 2, 3, 5, 8, 13, 33, 38); Protocol No. 1 (Article 1); Protocol No. 4 (Article 2); Fourth Geneva Convention

Keywords
- Extraterritorial jurisdiction; armed conflict; active hostilities; effective control; state agent authority; administrative practice; international humanitarian law

Georgia v. Russia (II) was an inter-state legal case decided by the Grand Chamber of the European Court of Human Rights (ECHR). The case originated from an application lodged by Georgia against the Russian Federation on 11 August 2008, amid the still ongoing armed conflict between the two nations over the breakaway entities of South Ossetia and Abkhazia. The final judgment, delivered on 21 January 2021, established important precedents regarding the extraterritorial application of the European Convention on Human Rights during wartime and military occupation.

The final ruling introduced a distinction between the active hostilities and the subsequent occupation phase. By an 11-to-6 vote, the Court ruled that events during the active fighting phase fell outside Russia's jurisdiction due to the "context of chaos," effectively creating a legal vacuum for battlefield actions. By an overwhelming 16-to-1 majority, the Court held Russia legally accountable for an administrative practice of severe human rights violations — including ethnic cleansing, civilian killings, torture of prisoners of war, and a failure to investigate deaths — during the occupation that followed the ceasefire.

== Proceedings ==
Georgia alleged that the Russian military and armed separatist groups under Russian control engaged in indiscriminate attacks against civilians, destroyed properties, and committed widespread human rights abuses during the August 2008 Russo-Georgian War. The complaints included violations of the right to life (Article 2), prohibition of torture and ill-treatment (Article 3), right to liberty (Article 5), and right to respect for private life (Article 8) envisaged in the European Convention on Human Rights, alongside structural barriers blocking the return of internally displaced persons (IDPs).

The Russian government contested the claims, arguing that its military intervention was a legitimate response to Georgian action. Russia maintained that the ECHR lacked jurisdiction because the events occurred during an armed conflict regulated by International humanitarian law, rather than the European Convention on Human Rights.

== Judgment on jurisdiction ==
The Grand Chamber drew a clear line between the active fighting phase and the post-ceasefire occupation phase. It ruled that during the active phase of the war (8–12 August 2008), Russia did not exercise "effective control" over the contested combat zones. It concluded that the chaotic reality of active fighting represents the antithesis of effective control. Consequently, the Court declared it lacked jurisdiction to evaluate operations occurring strictly within the active combat window.

Conversely, the Court ruled that after the ceasefire, Russia's strong military presence and its political and financial influence over the contested territories amounted to "effective control" over South Ossetia, Abkhazia, and the "buffer zone", that is, occupied parts of undisputed Georgian territory. Russia was thus held responsible for ensuring human rights protections within these areas.

== Findings on merits ==
The ECHR found Russia responsible for a continuous "administrative practice" — widespread and tolerated systemic violations — regarding multiple abuses such as systemic killing of civilians, torching, and looting of homes in ethnic Georgian villages within South Ossetia and the "buffer zone"; inhuman treatment and arbitrary detention of over 160 Georgian civilians (mostly women and elderly people); acts of torture perpetrated against Georgian prisoners of war by South Ossetian and Russian forces; and the systematic blocking of approximately 23,000 ethnic Georgian IDPs from returning home.

Additionally, the Court ruled that Russia failed to carry out prompt, effective, or independent domestic criminal investigations into these events. Russia was also cited under Article 38 for failing to fully cooperate with the ECHR by refusing to release classified military combat reports.

== Reactions ==
In Georgia, the "historic decision" by ECHR was hailed as a major victory by both government officials and the opposition, while Georgia's international partners similarly emphasized the significance of the landmark ruling. Georgian legal experts, including key contributors to the state's application, highlighted several core implications of the historic ruling. First, the judgment provides irreversible legal recognition of the Russian occupation and formally classifies the systemic abuses as deliberate, state-tolerated administrative practices. Additionally, by judicially validating the severe suffering of the victims, the ruling establishes a concrete legal framework for individual remedies and claims for just satisfaction and compensation. Finally, the decision significantly bolsters ongoing war crimes investigations at the International Criminal Court and offers a strategic opening for Georgia to renew its ethnic cleansing disputes against Russia at the International Court of Justice.

Regarding the Court's refusal to rule on the active combat phase, Georgian legal experts explained that the Grand Chamber avoided this politically sensitive area to adhere to established precedents, refusing to expand its jurisdiction into International Humanitarian Law or take on the burden of managing chaotic battlefield evidence.

Legal scholars Marco Longobardo and Stuart Wallace criticized the ECH's ruling in Georgia v Russia (II), arguing it was driven by political caution rather than sound legal reasoning. They contended that this ruling relied on flawed logic as the Court paradoxically claimed Russia lacked jurisdiction over active wartime deaths, yet still held Russia responsible for investigating war crimes from that exact same period. Ultimately, this landmark decision created dangerous gaps in human rights protections during armed conflicts, setting Strasbourg jurisprudence back and placing it "out of step" with mainstream international law.

== Related cases ==
Building upon the precedent established in Georgia v. Russia (II), the European Court of Human Rights issued a follow-up ruling on 23 June 2026 in the case of Malachini and Others v. Russia. The Court unanimously found Russia liable for the systemic torture and extrajudicial execution of Georgian prisoners of war during the 2008 conflict. In its legal reasoning, the Court distinguished captive military personnel from fluid combat operations, ruling that captured individuals fall directly under the extraterritorial jurisdiction of the detaining state and confirming that Russia maintained "effective control" over South Ossetia.
