= Gori Military Hospital =

Military Hospital of the Ministry of Defense of Georgia
- Ministry of Defense of Georgia
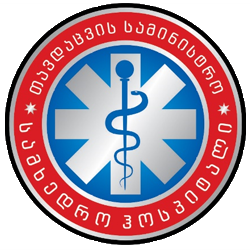

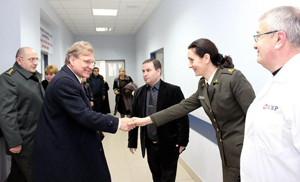
- The U.S. diplomats visiting the Gori Military Hospital in 2013.

Geography
- Location: Gori, Georgia (country)
- Coordinates: 41°58′49″N 44°6′53″E

Organisation
- Type: Military hospital
- Affiliated university: Tbilisi State Medical University

Services
- Beds: 176

History
- Opened: 2006

Links
- Website: guard.mod.gov.ge
- Lists: Hospitals in Georgia (country)
Giorgi Abramishvili Military Hospital
- Country: Georgia
Insignia
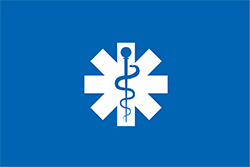
- Flag

Giorgi Abramishvili Military Hospital of the Ministry of Defence of Georgia (Georgian: გიორგი აბრამიშვილის სახელობის საქართველოს თავდაცვის სამინისტროს სამხედრო ჰოსპიტალი, romanized: giorgi abramishvilis sakhelobis sakartvelos tavdatsvis saminist'ros samkhedro hosp'it'ali), also known as the Gori Military Hospital (გორის სამხედრო ჰოსპიტალი, goris samkhedro hospitali), is a medical facility operated by the Ministry of Defense of Georgia and located in the city of Gori. In its current form, the center was established on 15 August 2006, succeeding the Soviet-era military hospital based in Georgia's capital of Tbilisi.

The hospital is a 176-bed facility, providing general medical and surgical care as well as a 24-hour emergency service for military personnel as well as for civilians. About 25% of the patients being treated at the hospital at any one time are civilians. It also functions as a teaching hospital for the Tbilisi State Medical University.

== History ==
The ability of the hospital to respond to mass casualty events was put to test during the August 2008 war with Russia. Beyond the Georgian military personnel, most of the civilians injured in or around Gori were initially taken to the Gori hospital for treatment. On 13 August 2008, at around 2:00 a.m. local time, a rocket fired from a Russian military helicopter hit a group of medical staff members in the hospital yard, killing an emergency room physician, Giorgi Abramishvili, who had spent the previous four days operating on people wounded during the hostilities. The Human Rights Watch concluded that attack on the hospital, which was "clearly marked with a red cross", was a "serious violation of international humanitarian law". The hospital was named after Abramishvili in August 2013.
