= Kekhvi =

Abandoned village in Georgia

Coordinates: 42°18′15.34″N 43°56′21.97″E

Kekhvi in Georgia

Kekhvi (Georgian: კეხვი Kekhvi, Ossetian: Чъех Chekh, Russian: Кехви Kekhvi) is a village in South Ossetia abandoned after the 2008 Russo-Georgian War. The village is located on the left bank of the Greater Liakhvi River. The Transcaucasian highway passes through the village. The road from Tskhinvali to Kekhvi is 7.38 km. Since the 2008 South Ossetia war, the village is controlled by the breakaway republic and included in the Tskhinvali district by its administrative divisions.

In the south of the village is situated the village of Kurta. To the east of the river is the village Kemerti.

North of the village is a small hydroelectric dam.

== See also ==
- Shida Kartli
