= Marko Bošnjak =

Marko Bošnjak may refer to:

- Marko Bošnjak (musician), Bosnian Croat singer-songwriter
- Marko Bošnjak (judge), Slovenian jurist
- Marko Bošnjak (basketball player), Bosnia and Herzegovina player, with KK Vrijednosnice Osijek
- Marko Bošnjak (banker), vice-governor of the Bank of Slovenia, Appointments by the 8th National Assembly of the Republic of Slovenia
