= Malachini and Others v. Russia =

European Court of Human Rights case

Submitted 11 February 2009 Decided 23 June 2026
- Full case name: Case of Malachini and Others v. Russia
- Case: 9184/09 and 22580/10
- ECLI: ECLI:CE:ECHR:2026:0623JUD000918409
- Case type: Human Rights
- Chamber: Second Section (Chamber)
- Language of proceedings: English
- Nationality of parties: Russia / Georgia

Ruling
- Unanimous violation of Articles 2 (substantive and procedural) and 3 (substantive and procedural) of the European Convention on Human Rights due to the torture, extrajudicial execution, and lack of effective investigation regarding captured Georgian servicemen by Russian and South Ossetian forces.
- President; Arnfinn Bårdsen
- Judges: Saadet Yüksel; Péter Paczolay; Oddný Mjöll Arnardóttir; Gediminas Sagatys; Stéphane Pisani; Juha Lavapuro

Instruments cited
- European Convention on Human Rights (Articles 1, 2, 3, 38, 41); Third Geneva Convention of 1949

Keywords
- Extraterritorial jurisdiction, prisoner of war, armed conflict, Russo-Georgian War, torture, effective control, right to life

Malachini and Others v. Russia, joined with Chikviladze and Antsukhelidze v. Russia, is a human rights case decided by a seven-judge chamber of the European Court of Human Rights (ECtHR) on 23 June 2026. The case arose from applications lodged in 2009 and 2010 concerning the summary execution and systemic torture of Georgian prisoners of war by Russian forces and their South Ossetian allies during the August 2008 Russo-Georgian War. The Court unanimously found the Russian Federation liable for substantive and procedural violations of Article 2 (right to life) and Article 3 (prohibition of torture) of the European Convention on Human Rights.

== Background ==
During the active phase of the August 2008 conflict, several Georgian military personnel were taken prisoner in and around Tskhinvali. The applications detailed the cases of eight servicemen held in captivity. Junior Sergeant Ushangi Sopromadze was executed on 10 August 2008, after captors identified him as a tank crew member. Corporal Kakhaber Khubuluri was singled out and executed on 11 August 2008, by captors who discovered his Ossetian ancestry and branded him a "traitor". Assistant Gunner Giorgi Antsukhelidze went missing on 9 August 2008; video footage later emerged showing him bound, brutally beaten, and tortured by men in military uniforms. The remains of all three men were returned to Georgia in November 2008 and identified via DNA analysis.

Five surviving servicemen — Davit Malachini, Zaza Kavtiashvili, Imeda Kutashvili, Malkhaz Meladze, and Kakhaber Zirakashvili — were detained between 8 August and 19 August 2008. The Court found they were routinely beaten, had their skin and fingers burnt, and were forced to walk on the Georgian flag. The survivors were repatriated on 19 August in a prisoner exchange.

== Legal proceedings and core findings ==
The applicants were represented by the Georgian Young Lawyers' Association (GYLA) and the Stichting Justice Initiative (SJI), with the Georgian government acting as a third-party intervener.

=== Extraterritorial jurisdiction ===
Russia argued that because these abuses happened during active battlefield fighting, they fell outside the Court's reach. However, the ECtHR rejected this argument, drawing a distinction between fluid combat operations and the physical custody of captives and ruling that once a soldier is captured and detained, they are under the extraterritorial jurisdiction of the capturing state.

=== Effective control and attribution ===
Building upon the precedent of Georgia v. Russia (II), the Court ruled that Russia exercised "effective control" over South Ossetia through military, political, and financial influence. Citing the European Union Fact-Finding Mission's report, the Court noted that the South Ossetian de facto government was not "effective on its own". Consequently, Russia was held responsible for the abuses committed by South Ossetian forces without requiring proof of "detailed control" over each specific act. The Court also cited direct Russian military involvement, including the presence of Russian federal forces at detention sites and the direct interrogation of prisoners by Russian servicemen.

The ECtHR ruled that the ill-treatment constituted "acts of torture" under Article 3, emphasizing its gravity against protected prisoners of war under international humanitarian law. It also found a procedural violation because Russia failed to carry out an effective criminal investigation into the abuses.

== Judgment enforcement ==
As compensation, the Court ordered Russia to pay €65,000 to each family of the three deceased soldiers and €40,000 to each of the five surviving servicemen. However, enforcement remains uncertain because Russia, following its expulsion from the Council of Europe in 2022, has enacted domestic legislation refusing to execute ECtHR judgments delivered after 15 March 2022.

The Georgian Young Lawyers' Association hailed the ECtHR ruling as a major, precedent-setting victory and pursued alternative enforcement. They petitioned the ECtHR and the Georgian Ministry of Foreign Affairs to establish an international Compensation Fund. This proposed mechanism aimed to seize and accumulate Russian material assets frozen outside its borders to ensure the affected Georgian citizens actually receive their legal reparations.
