= Georgian Young Lawyers' Association =

- Abbreviation: GYLA
- Motto: GYLA - 30 Years of Impartial Election Observation
- Location: Georgia
- Chairpersons: Tamar Oniani
- Website: www.gyla.ge/en

Georgia Young Lawyers' Association or GYLA is a Georgian lawyers' association created in 1994 with the aim of providing human rights and legal support. In April 2025, GYLA was awarded the Organization for Security and Co-operation in Europe (OSCE) Democracy Defender Award for its support for human rights and the rule of law. On 30 September 2026, GYLA was named a recipient of the prestigious 2026 Right Livelihood Award (often called the "Alternative Nobel Prize").

== Creation and aims ==
In 1988, as the Soviet Union started to dissolve, Georgian lawyers wishing to practice law rather than serving repressive aims of the state started to discuss coordinating as a group. In 1994, ninety lawyers met in the Tbilisi Schoolchildren's Palace and established the Georgia Young Lawyers' Association.

GYLA's aims include promoting the rule of law and contributing to awareness and protection of human rights in Georgia. GYLA aims to encourage ethical standards among lawyers.

== Leadership and structure ==
From 2022 to 2025, Nona Kurdovanidze was the chairperson of GYLA. In December 2025 Tamar Oniani was elected as the chairperson of GYLA.

== Activities ==
GYLA provides free legal consultations, provides legal representation, promotes legal reform, and monitors government activities and elections. It has legal aid centres in Tbilisi and seven other towns. As of 2025, GYLA provided free consultations to about 50,000 people annually.

GYLA specialises in legal help in relation to human rights violations by government or other administrative institutions, the rights of minorities and prisoners' rights.

The Kutaisi GYLA branch carried out a women's rights training, including simulations of court trials and legislative debates.

GYLA has taken actions in the Constitutional Court of Georgia and the European Court of Human Rights (ECHR). According to GYLA, as of 2025, eight of the 30 lawsuits submitted to the Constitutional Court were successful, and eight of the 135 lawsuits submitted to the ECHR were successful, while most remained open.

GYLA created a legal defence centre against violation of journalists' rights.

In June 2026, the GYLA secured a major victory before the European Court of Human Rights in the joined cases of Malachini and Others v. Russia. Representing the families of Georgian servicemen tortured and executed during the 2008 Russo-Georgian War, GYLA successfully argued that Russia held extraterritorial jurisdiction over prisoners of war from the moment of capture, even during active hostilities. The Court ruled in favor of GYLA's clients, ordering Russia to pay €395,000 in damages.

== Awards ==
In April 2025, GYLA was awarded the Organization for Security and Co-operation in Europe (OSCE) Democracy Defender Award by eight OSCE member states for its "efforts to protect democracy, human rights, the rule of law, and due process for Georgians since 1994". British government Minister Stephen Doughty stated that GYLA had provided "essential support" to human rights activists and non-governmental organisations during the democratic backsliding, including repression, during the 2024–2025 Georgian political crisis.
