= Mikhail Mindzaev =

Russian government official (born 1955)

Mikhail Mayramovich Mindzaev (also spelled Mindzayev, Russian: Михаил Майрамович Миндзаев; born 28 September 1955) is a former Russian police officer and government official. Married to Manana Mindzaeva since 1973. He was Minister of Internal Affairs in the de facto government of South Ossetia, a breakaway entity in Georgia, from 2005 to 2008, including throughout the 2008 Russo-Georgian War. The International Criminal Court (ICC) indicted him for war crimes against Georgian civilians and issued an arrest warrant in 2022.

== Biography ==
Born in Vladikavkaz, North Ossetian ASSR (now North Ossetia–Alania), Russian SFSR, in 1955, Mindzaev served in the Soviet and then Russian Internal Troops, rising to the rank of colonel in 2005. In April 2005, Mindzaev — by that time Deputy Chief of Staff of the Ministry of Internal Affairs of North Ossetia–Alania — was appointed Minister of Internal Affairs in the secessionist government of South Ossetia. He was promoted to the rank of lieutenant general in 2007.

When hostilities broke out in South Ossetia in August 2008, Mindzaev remained in the region and accused the Georgian government for the state of war. His duties during and after the war brought him in close contact with Russian forces. Mindzaev was dismissed as Minister of Internal Affairs of South Ossetia shortly after the war. He then served in Russia in various capacities, including Deputy Chief of the Main Directorate of Internal Affairs of Russia's Southern Federal District and chief of police of the Nenets Autonomous Okrug. Local Ossetian media reported that Mindzaev was granted the title of Hero of Russia in 2009, but the Russian news outlet Izvestia was unable to verify the claim.

In 2022, the International Criminal Court investigation concluded that, during the 2008 war, Mindzaev "intentionally and knowingly perpetrated or otherwise contributed to alleged war crimes" committed against ethnic Georgians, including unlawful confinement, torture, and hostage taking. In June 2022, arrest warrants were issued for Mindzaev and two other South Ossetian officials.
