= Giorgi Antsukhelidze =

Georgian soldier (1984–2008)

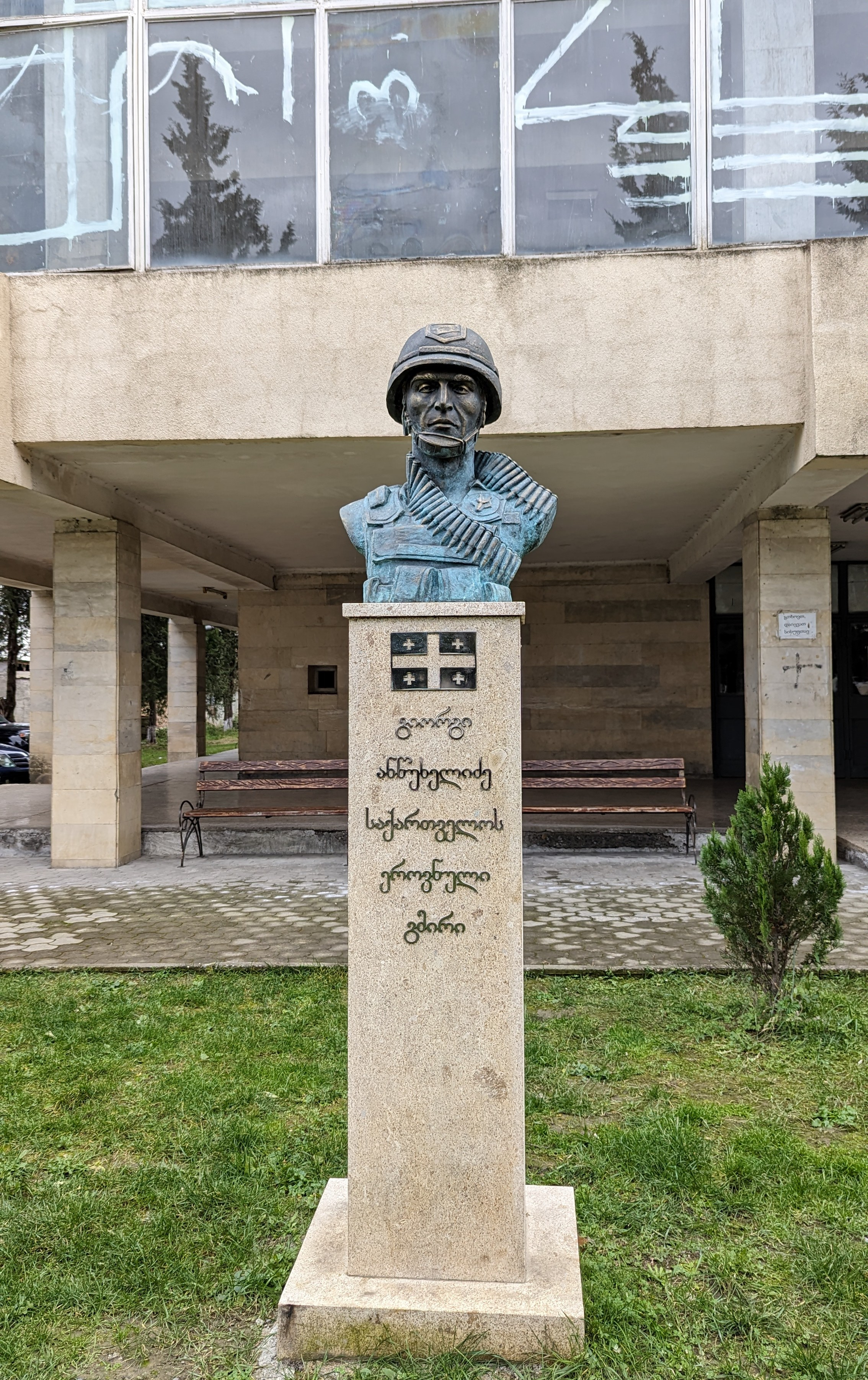
- Antsukhelidze's bust in Kvemo Alvani, Georgia.
- Born: August 18, 1984; Kvemo Alvani, Georgian SSR, Soviet Union
- Died: August 10, 2008 (aged 23) Tskhinvalis Region, Georgia
- Allegiance: Georgia
- Conflicts: Russo-Georgian War; Battle of Tskhinvali (executed)

Giorgi Antsukhelidze (Georgian: გიორგი ანწუხელიძე; 18 August 1984 – c. 9–10 August 2008) was a Georgian soldier who was murdered during the hostilities in Samachablo in the course of the Russo-Georgian War of August 2008. He is the subject of two Internet videos showing his interrogation and torture by the South Ossetian militants and Russian forces. He was posthumously awarded the Order of National Hero by the Georgian government in 2013.

== Military service and death ==
Giorgi Antsukhelidze was born in 1984 in the village of Kvemo Alvani in the highland Akhmeta Municipality in northeast Georgia. He was conscripted in the Georgian Armed Forces in 2001. He then served in various infantry units, headquartered at Senaki and then at Vaziani. Junior Sergeant Antsukhelidze served as an assistant gunner in the 41st Battalion of the 4th Infantry Brigade during the Russo–Georgian War of August 2008. He went missing in action on 9 August 2008 during the battle of Tskhinvali as Georgian forces were advancing into the Shankhai district of Tskhinvali, and was considered as such until December 2008, when his body was identified through DNA testing remains retrieved from South Ossetian militants. He was buried at the fraternal cemetery of Georgian soldiers at Mukhatgverdi near Tbilisi.

== Personal life ==
He had a wife Maka Chikviladze and two children.

== Torture ==
In January 2009 two video recordings emerged on the Internet showing soldiers in the South Ossetian uniforms torturing a captured Georgian soldier whom the relatives identified as Antsukhelidze. The video footage shows the militants, speaking in Ossetian and Georgian, interrogating the prisoner, forcing him to kneel and ordering him to kiss the earth. The captured soldier in a Georgian uniform is shown being repeatedly beaten and replying to each question: "I have no idea". One of the torturers is heard shouting in Ossetian: "Look, what a tough guy!". In April 2010, the Georgian non-governmental organization Georgian Young Lawyer's Association filed a claim to the European Court of Human Rights in favor of the Antsukhelidze family. The claim refers to facts of torture and murder by Russian and Ossetian militaries. A high-ranking South Ossetian officer, Soslan Pukhayev, claimed by the Georgian reports to have been associated with the murder of Antsukhelidze, was arrested by the Georgian police in July 2009.

According to Ukrainska Pravda, Russian Colonel Sergey Sukharev, who was involved in the torture of Georgian soldier Giorgi Antsukhelidze, was killed during the Russo-Ukrainian War in March of 2022. Sukharev served as the commander of the 331st Guards Airborne Regiment, which participated in the 2008 Russo-Georgian War. In March 2025, Kazbek Timov, an Ossetian separatist and one of the torturers of Giorgi Antsukhelidze, was killed by Ukrainian forces while participating in the Russo-Ukrainian War. Another Ossetian separatist Vladimir Khanikaev, who took part in the torturing of Giorgi Antsukhelidze was killed in Russo-Ukrainian War in March 2025. Another Ossetian from Vladikavkaz, Alan Beroev, who took part in the torture was killed in October 2025 in the Russo-Ukrainian war. Russian soldier, Vladimir Liakin, who took part in torturing of Giorgi Antsukhelidze was killed in Ukraine November 2025. Ossetian separatist, Alan Kazachkov, who took part in torturing of Giorgi Antsukhelidze was killed in Ukraine November 2025

=== European Court of Human Rights ruling ===
On June 23, 2026, the European Court of Human Rights (ECtHR) delivered a ruling against Russia for severe human rights violations during the 2008 conflict. The Court found Russia liable for violating the right to life and the prohibition of torture regarding eight Georgian prisoners of war, including Giorgi Antsukhelidze. The ECtHR established that Russia exercised "effective control" over South Ossetian forces, meaning Moscow bore responsibility for the systematic torture inflicted on the prisoners. Furthermore, the Court ruled that Russia failed to conduct an effective investigation into the deaths of Antsukhelidze and two other servicemen, as well as the torture of five survivors. Russia was ordered to pay €65,000 to Antsukhelidze's family and varying damages to other victims. However, enforcement remains unclear as Russia passed legislation refusing to honor ECtHR judgments following its 2022 expulsion from the Council of Europe.

== Awards and memory ==
On 15 April 2013 President of Georgia Mikheil Saakashvili posthumously awarded Giorgi Antsukhelidze the Order of National Hero. Antsukhelidze had earlier been awarded the Order of Vakhtang Gorgasali, 1st Class. Antsukhelidze's name was given to a NCO school operated by the Ministry of Defense of Georgia in November 2013. He was also honored by President Giorgi Margvelashvili in his inaugural speech in November 2013.
