= List of political parties in South Ossetia =

This article lists political parties in South Ossetia, a partially recognized Caucasian republic, considered by most countries to be a part of Georgia.

== Current Parliamentary Parties ==
| Name | Abbr. | Leader | Ideology | Parliament | Political position |
|---|---|---|---|---|---|
| Nykhas; Ныхас | N Н | Zita Besayeva | Ossetian nationalism | 10 / 34 | Centre-right to right-wing |
| United Ossetia; Иугонд Ир | UO; ИИ | Alan Tadtaev | Conservatism; Ossetian nationalism | 7 / 34 | Centre-right |
| People's Party; Хуссар Ирыстоны Адӕмон парти | PPSO; ХИАп | Sergei Kharebov | Social liberalism | 5 / 34 | Centre to centre-left |
| Communist Party of South Ossetia; Хуссар Ирыстоны Коммунистон парти | HIKP; ХИКп | Stanislav Kochiev | Marxism–Leninism; Soviet patriotism | 3 / 34 | Far-left |

== Current non-Parliamentary Parties ==
| Name | Abbr. | Leader | Ideology | Political position | Ref |
|---|---|---|---|---|---|
| Development Party | DP; Пр | Albert Valiev | Autarky | Centrist | |
| Fatherland Socialist Party | F о | Vyacheslav Gobozov | Socialism | Left-wing | |
| For Justice | FJ; Зс | Harry Muldarov | Conservatism | Centre-right | |
| Ira Farn | IF; ИФ | Hoh Chochiev | Nationalism | Right-wing | |
| Iryston's feet of the faltar | | | | | |
| Iron | I И | Georgiy Kabisov | Democratic socialism Soviet patriotism | Far-left | |
| Patriots of Alanya | PA пА | Dzambolat Tedeev | Ossetian nationalism | Right-wing | |
| Unity of the People | UP; Ен | Vladimir Kelekhsaev | Ossetian nationalism | Centre-right | |
| Unity Party | UP; И | Zurab Kokoyev | Social conservatism | Centre-right | |

== Historic Parties ==
| Name | Abbr. | Dates | Leader | Ideology | Political position |
|---|---|---|---|---|---|
| Party of Communists of the Republic of South Ossetia (Note: Member of the Communist Party of the Soviet Union (2001)) | PCRSO; ПкРЮО | 2001-2004 | | Marxism–Leninism; Anti-revisionism | Far-left |
| Alanian Union | AU; Ас | 2017–2019 | Alan Gagloev | Ossetian nationalism | Right-wing |
| Homeland | H Р | | | | |
| New Ossetia | NO; НО | 2012–2019 | David Sanakoyev | Anti-corruption | Centrist |
| Social Democratic Party | SDP; Сдп | 2010–2014 | Dmitry Tasoev | Ossetian nationalism | Centre-right |
| Styr Nyxas | SN; СН | 1993–? | | Ossetian nationalism; Anti-Ingush sentiment; Anti-militarism | |
| Towers | T б | 2016-2019 | Botaz Gagloev | Reformism | Centrist |
| Iron | I И | 2010–2010 | Timur Tskhovrebov | Anti-corruption | Centrist |
| Ossetia – Liberty Square | O-LS; О–ПС | 2012–2019 | Alla Dzhioyeva | Anti-establishment | Centrist |

== See also ==
- List of political parties in Abkhazia
- List of political parties in Georgia
- Lists of political parties
