= Alan Alborov (politician) =

South Ossetian politician

- Æлборты Алан; Алан Алборов
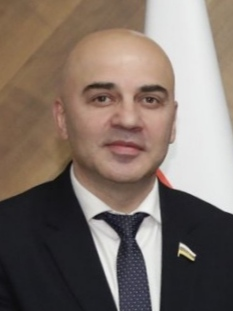
- Alborov in 2023

Speaker of the Parliament of South Ossetia
- In office 15 September 2022 – 24 June 2024
- Preceded by: Alan Tadtaev
- Succeeded by: Alan Margiev

Member of the Parliament of South Ossetia
- In office 2019–2024

Mayor of Tskhinvali
- In office 2013–2017

Chairman of Nykhaz
- In office 2013–2014
- Preceded by: Position established
- Succeeded by: Ruslan Gagloyev

Personal details
- Born: 22 August 1976 (age 50)
- Party: Independent (before 2013); Nykhaz (since 2013)
- Occupation: Businessman

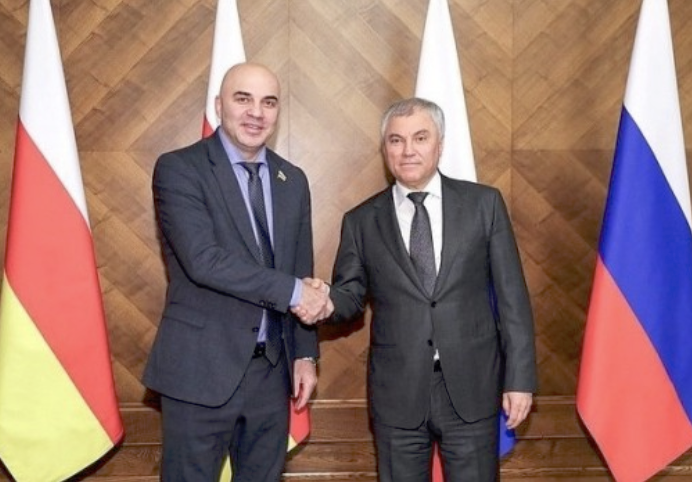
Alborov meeting with the Chairman of the Russian Duma, Vyacheslav Volodin

Alan Yuryevich Alborov (Iron Ossetic: Æлборты Алан Юрийы фырт, Ælborty Alan Jurijy fyrt, Russian: Алан Юрьевич Алборов; born 22 August 1976) is an Ossetian politician from partially recognized South Ossetia and former speaker of the Parliament of South Ossetia from September 2022 to June 2024. Alborov has served as the founding chairman of the Nykhaz political party, as well as the mayor of the capital city of Tskhinvali.

== Early life ==
Alborov was born to an urban middle-class family in Tskhinvali. He had a successful career as a businessman in Russia, where he and his brother, Oleg, made a small fortune selling vodka in North Ossetia.

Alborov was named by President Leonid Tibilov as the head of housing and communal services in the Leningor District after a long period of absence from his homeland.

== Political career ==
=== Mayoralty ===
After Tibilov introduced Alborov to politics he quickly elevated his position in Tibilov's entourage, being named the mayor Tskhinvali in 2013. At the same time Tibilov, a political independent, tasked Alborov with creating for him a pro-government political party to unite his supporters. Alborov's political party was named Nykhaz, literally meaning "speech" or "meeting."

Alborov's leadership of the party would be brief, as he would be replaced as chairman by Ruslan Gagloyev early in 2014 so he could prepare for the 2014 election. After the 2017 election saw Tibilov's re-election bid be defeated, Alborov was replaced as mayor by the new president, Anatoly Bibilov.

=== Parliamentarian ===
Prior to being named speaker, Gagloev was elected to the Parliament of South Ossetia for Nykhaz in 2019. Since 2020 Nykhaz, Unity of the People and the People's Party entered a governing coalition. Additionally, Alborov served as chairman of the committee on natural resources.

=== Speakership ===
Following the 2022 election, Nykhaz's Alan Gagloev secured the Presidency and moved to limit the power and influence of the former ruling party, United Ossetia. This included pressuring incumbent Speaker, Alan Tadtaev, to resign with Alborov being named to the position after defeating another United Ossetian cannidate, the chairman of the defense and security committee, Atsamaz Bibilov. Alborov was officially sworn in as speaker on September 15, 2022.

On December 15, 2022, Alborov went on a state visit to Russia where he met with the chairman of the Russian Duma, Vyacheslav Volodin. The pair discussed future cooperation between Nykhaz and United Russia and to establish an “inter-parliamentary” bilateral commission to promote cooperation. During the meeting, Volodin referred to South Ossetia as an independent state, instead as either part of Russia or Georgia, and that the relationships between the states of Russia and South Ossetia are “based on the principles of equality, good neighborliness and mutual respect.”

On July 5, 2023, Alan Tekhov, chairman of the committee on economy, small business and agriculture, and Zaza Driaev, chairman of the profile committee, proposed a motion to investigate possible Belarusian recognition of South Ossetia as an independent state. Speaker Alborov approved the motion and opened an official investigation for further elaboration.

In March 2024, Alborov, while discussing the proposal to have South Ossetia be annexed by Russia, didn't rule out the possibility of holding a referendum regarding the issue, saying that it was "being discussed in close coordination with Moscow".

=== Presidential administration ===
Alborov did not seek re-election in the 2024 elections, instead opting to leave Parliament and return to Gagloev's staff as his new Head of the Presidential Administration via decree on July 22, 2024.
