= Atsamaz Bibilov =

South Ossetian politician

Member of the Parliament of South Ossetia

Personal details
- Party: United Ossetia

Atsamaz Bibilov is an Ossetian politician from the partially recognized Caucasian Republic of South Ossetia, which most of the UN recognizes as part of Georgia, occupied by Russia. Bibilov is a member of the Parliament of South Ossetia, being the chairman of its defense and security committee, one of the senior leadership roles.

== Biography ==
Bibilov is a member of the Parliament of South Ossetia, serving as member of United Ossetia, the Russophilic establishment party. In 2019, as chairman of the defense and security committee, Bibilov condemned Georgian police for establishing a roadblock and checkpoint at the border near the village of Uista, calling the action a "provocation" and a violation of South Ossetian "sovereignty." Bibilov reported the incident to the Incident Prevention and Response Mechanism, however, as with all the instances of Russian and South Ossetian forces establishing border barriers, did nothing to stop Georgian police. The State Security Service of Georgia responded to the incident, stating that Georgia will not be bullied by foreign powers to dictate what Georgia can and cannot do within its own border.

In 2020 Bibilov approved Konstantin Dzhussoev being named Prime Minister of South Ossetia after Dzhussoev was interviewed by Bibilov, and two other members of the defense and security committee, Robert Ostaev and Ivan Slanov. In 2022, following the election of Nykhaz's Alan Gagloev to the office of President of South Ossetia, Gagloev removed speaker of parliament Alan Tadtaev, due to his opposition to Gagloev, and being one of the leading ideologues of United Ossetia. Bibilov was presented by United Ossetia as a compromise candidate due to Bibilov's chairmanship of the defense and security committee, however, Alan Alborov, the founder of Nykhaz, was elected speaker instead.
