= Garry Muldarov =

South Ossetian politician

Member of the Parliament of South Ossetia
- Incumbent
- Assumed office 2019

Personal details
- Born: 1987 (age 38–39)
- Party: United Ossetia (before 2021); Independent (since 2021)

Garry Muldarov is a politician from the small, partially recognized, South Caucasian Republic of South Ossetia, serving as a member of parliament since 2019 as a member of the pro-Russian establishment United Ossetia, however, would leave the party in 2021 to become a political independent.

== Biography ==
Muldarov was born in 1987.

Muldarov worked in the South Ossetian defense ministry from 2003 to 2013 and for the South Ossetian KGB from 2013 to 2018. Muldarov was elected to the Parliament of South Ossetia in 2019 as part of Anatoly Bibilov's pro-Russian United Ossetia, however, broke from the party and became a political independent.

In 2021, Muldarov made headlines when he engaged in a fist fight with fellow MP Igor Chochiev. Muldarov denied any wrongdoing while also attacking his opponents as pro-Georgian agents spreading disinformation. Strelkov, a former militia leader and volunteer in the War in Donbass, was accused of pocketing money designated for the construction of housing. At the time, both Chochiev and Muldarov were part of United Ossetia.

Muldarov's dispute with United Ossetia centered around his time as the head of the parliamentary commission for the delimitation and demarcation of the border with Georgia, with Muldarov splitting from United Ossetia shortly after accusing Bibilov of ceding 200 square kilometers of land to Georgia. Bibilov would survive a vote of no confidence initiated by 14 MPs after the scandal.

Muldarov stood as a candidate in the 2022 South Ossetian presidential election, earning 9.33% of the electorate, or 2,592 votes, placing fourth and being eliminated in the first round. In the second round Muldarov supported opposition candidate Alan Gagloev. The election was noted for the incumbent government of Bibilov barring 12 candidates, mostly from the opposition, from standing.

In 2022, Muldarov announced that he intended to create his own political party. The then 35-year old Muldarov called on the youth of South Ossetia to rally around him to form a youth-populist movement. Local pundits are unsure if Muldarov's new party will support or oppose the presidency of Gagloev, as, post election, the relationship between Gagloev and Muldarov has soured, and Muldarov has extensive ties to the pro-Russian establishment.

In 2022, Muldarov, alongside two other South Ossetian MPs, Robert Ostaev and Arsen Kvezerov personally delivered aid to Russian forces in the Donbas as part of the Russian invasion of Ukraine.

In 2024 Muldarov, alongside two other leading anti-establishment politicians, Dzambolat Medoev and David Sanakoev, had their Russian citizenship stripped at the behest of the Federal Security Service due to their support of "establishing a state border with Georgia." This comes as Russia is attempting to re-approach Georgia, with a softer position on South Ossetia, which the South Ossetian government has accused of being the product of a "Georgian lobby" in Moscow.
