= Zalina Lalieva =

South Ossetian politician

South Ossetian Minister of Justice
- In office 2017–2022
- Preceded by: Marina Bestayeva (acting)
- Succeeded by: Oleg Gagloev

Personal details
- Party: Independent

Zalina Lalieva is a lawyer from the small partially recognized Caucasian republic of South Ossetia who served as President Anatoly Bibilov's Minister of Justice from 2017 to 2022.

== Biography ==
Lalieva worked as a lawyer for the Parliament of South Ossetia since 2005.

=== Minister of Justice ===
After the election of Anatoly Bibilov in the 2017 presidential election, Lalieva was named the new Minister of Justice. During her appointment, Bibilov praised her "independent opinion", as she did not belong to his United Ossetia party, as well as her principledness. Lalieva called the appointment "unexpected" but that she welcomed the post. Her deputy was Marina Bestayeva, who had served as acting Minister of Justice between Bibilov's election on April 9, and Lalieva's appointment on June 7. One of her first acts was to ban Jehovah Witnesses in South Ossetia, branding the group an extremist organization, and allowing the unrestricted searches and seizures of suspected Jehovah Witnesses.

On July 11, 2019, inmates at a South Ossetian penal colony started a hunger strike due to poor conditions. After failing to negotiate with the inmates, employees in Lalieva's ministry force fed the inmates, and beat those that continued their strike. On July 7, 2020, 20 inmates of the same penal colony attempted to perform a mass suicide by slitting their wrists, however, each of them where forcefully given medical care and none died. Shortly afterwards 20 of the 34 members of Parliament put forward a motion requesting a vote of no confidence to oust Lalieva, however, the vote was blocked by the head of the Council of Ministers, Erik Pukhaev.

In 2019 Lalieva met with her Russian counterpart Alexander Konovalov in Moscow to discuss creating a unified pension program, penal system, and bailiff service. In 2021 Lalieva met with her Russian counterpart Konstantin Chuichenko over video-call to sign a Cooperation Program for 2022-2023 in the fields of digitalization, departmental rule-making, monitoring of law enforcement, forensic examination, state accounting and systematization of regulatory legal acts, etc.

Lalieva survived a mass sacking of ministers by Bibilov in 2021, in the wake of the Murder of Inal Djabiev by excessive police force. She would be replaced by the new President Alan Gagloev in favor of Oleg Gagloev, following Bibilov's defeat in the 2022 presidential election.
