= Towers (South Ossetia) =

- Leader: Botaz Gagloev
- Founded: 2016
- Dissolved: 2019
- Headquarters: Tskhinvali
- Ideology: anti-Bibilov; Reformism
- Political position: Centrism

Towers was a political party in the partially recognized Caucasian republic of South Ossetia founded in 2016 to contest the 2019 South Ossetian parliamentary election, however, had their registration blocked and never contested an election.

== History ==
President Anatoly Bibilov, while having his supporters, also had many critics, however, due to the structure of the South Ossetian state, the only political parties tolerated by Bibilov and the government where those supportive of them, leaving no room for official dissent. Towers was formed in an attempt to form an official opposition party that would actually challenge Bibilov to implement reforms like a non-partisan judiciary, improved access to healthcare, as well as general anti-corruption efforts. The party was wholly grassroots with its membership and leadership not coming from any prior established political movement.

The party attempted to contest the 2019 election, however, the Ministry of Justice blocked their registration, while not giving an official reason. Justice Minister Zalina Lalieva stated that the reason their registration was rejected was due to "serious mistakes of the party’s representatives" and refused to elaborate. At around the same time Speaker of Parliament Peter Gassiev stated that there where too many parties in South Ossetia to properly represent its small population, and the government also refused the registration of two other parties; Alanian Union and New Ossetia. The party tried to sue the Ministry of Justice to force them to release why their registration was rejected, which reached the Supreme Court of South Ossetia which found in favor of the Ministry of Justice.
