= For Justice =

For Justice Рӕстдзинады сӕрыл За справедливость
- Leader: Harry Muldarov
- Founder: Harry Muldarov
- Founded: February 26, 2023,
- Registered: May 4, 2023
- Split from: United Ossetia
- Ideology: Ossetian nationalism; Anti-Establishment; Reformism; Russophilia
- leanings: pro-Bibilov
- Parliament: 0 / 34

For Justice (Ossetian: Рӕстдзинады сӕрыл; Russian: За справедливость) is a political party in the partially recognized Caucasian republic of South Ossetia. Founded in 2023 (Note: The group had existed since 2020 as a NGO) by Member of Parliament and former journalist, Harry Muldarov, the primary goal of the party was stated as fighting for truth and justice in South Ossetia. Muldarov also stated that the primary demographic of the new party is the younger generations, and that social media has been one of their key avenues for spreading their messages.

== History ==
Prior to the party's official foundation, the group existed as a NGO founded after the Murder of Inal Djabiev. In August 2021 two members of the society where named to the Central Election Commission (CEC), the body that organizes elections and counts votes. At the party's official establishment it had five members in parliament, including Muldarov, all of them defections from United Ossetia The party was officially registered on May 4, 2023.

At the party's founding congress on February 26, 2023, 100 delegates voted on the party's leadership, with Muldarov winning unanimously, and a seven-member executive committee being named consisting of; Gino Tskhovrebov, Andrey Maldzigov, Arthur Zasseev, Azamat Tedeev, Alina Dzeranova, Snezhan Gogichev, and Nana Bakaeva. At the congress Muldarov congratulated "our guys" fighting for Russia in Russia's invasion of Ukraine and announced he would support the annexation of South Ossetia into Russia.

They would be joined by former leader of the People's Party, Amiran Diakonov, and former leader of Nykhaz, and convicted war criminal and international fugitive David Sanakoev, bringing their total presence in Parliament up to 7, making them the second largest party.

The party has been notably critical of overtly pro-Russian politicians, accusing a number of MPs who regularly travel to Russia of smuggling cigarettes and other contraband over the border, bypassing dues and customs.

The party was initially supportive of longtime opposition leader Alan Gagloev following his election as President of South Ossetia in 2022, however, after the Russian government stripped Muldarov, Diakonov, and Sanakoev of their Russian citizenship for supporting creating a "state border" between South Ossetia and Georgia, the party claimed that the Russian government acted under orders of Gagloev to punish and weaken his opposition.

=== 2024 election ===
The party held its second congress on April 11, 2024, where the party nominated its candidates for the 2024 elections. 30 delegates participated, ten from Tskhinvali, and five from each of South Ossetia's districts. At which the party nominated the following candidates: incumbent MPs Harry Muldarov, David Sanakoev, Dzambolyt Medoev, and Amiran Diakonov, as well as SVR veteran Andrei Maldzihov, and former Leningor district head Soslan Gabaraev, controversial for his staunch support of Anatoly Bibilov, as well as a number of Muldarov's "Jorz-lapu" (yes-men). The party focused most of their efforts and famous candidates on the 17 seats awarded by proportional vote, leaving the first-past-the-post seats up to political unknowns.

Despite initial optimism that the party would be allowed to stand for election due to a general relaxation of the election laws, the party would be denied registration by the CEC, a decision that the party heavily protested. The party issued a statement where they denounced that ruling saying it "contradict[s] the law and massively violate[s] the constitutional rights of citizens to elect and be elected" and is an "unlawful decision." Diakonov went on to say that "The ruling party ‘Nykhas’ blatantly disregards the law. The election campaign is conducted outside the boundaries of both law and decency." The party appealed the ruling, which stated that the party could not stand for election since its leadership are Russian citizens, despite Muldarov, Diakonov, and Sanakoev having their Russian citizenship stripped, and there being no ban on foreigners seeking elected office anywhere in South Ossetian law.
