= Alan Margiev =

South Ossetian politician

- Алан Мæргъиты; Алан Маргиев

Speaker of the Parliament of South Ossetia
- Incumbent
- Assumed office June 24, 2024
- Preceded by: Alan Alborov

Member of the Parliament of South Ossetia
- Incumbent
- Assumed office 2024

Minister of Agriculture of South Ossetia
- In office 2021–2023

Personal details
- Born: 1987 (age 38–39) Tskhinvali, South Ossetian Autonomous Oblast, Georgian SSR, Soviet Union
- Party: Nykhas
- Education: Moscow State Pedagogical University; Russian Presidential Academy of National Economy and Public Administration

Alan Taimurazovich Margiev (Russian: Алан Таймуразович Маргиев, Iron Ossetic: Алан Таймуразы фырт Мæргъиты, Alan Tajmurazy fyrt Mærhity; born 1987) is an Ossetian politician from the small, partially recognized Republic of South Ossetia who, since June 24, 2024, has been the Speaker of the Parliament of South Ossetia.

== Biography ==
Alan Margiev was born in the city of Tskhinvali in 1987. He studied at the Moscow State Pedagogical University and graduated with a degree in management in 2008; he then attended the Russian Presidential Academy of National Economy and Public Administration from 2013-2015.

Margiev began his political career in October 2017 when he was appointed the head of the State Veterinary and Phytosanitary Surveillance Service. Margiev made a name for himself as a staunch supporter of Nykhas' former leader and the incumbent President of South Ossetia, Alan Gagloev. In February 2021, Margiev was appointed as the Minister of Agriculture, after which he was appointed the Head of the Administration of the President of the Republic of South Ossetia in October 2023.

Margiev was elected to the Parliament of South Ossetia during the 2024 South Ossetian parliamentary election as a member of Nykhas' party list. Shortly after Margiev was elected Speaker after a single ballot with 27 votes out of 34. Margiyev has denounced efforts by United Ossetia to protest the election and refuse to participate in government due to perceived fraud. However, he eventually called for "compromise" with United Ossetia, for national stability, announcing that the Central Election Commission would investigate claims of fraud at polling stations which could cost the Communists two seats in parliament to be awarded to United Ossetia instead. This came shortly after the arrival of Russian politicians for negotiations for a bilateral cooperation treaty between the Russian Duma and South Ossetia's parliament.
