= Vladimir Kelekhsaev =

South Ossetian politician

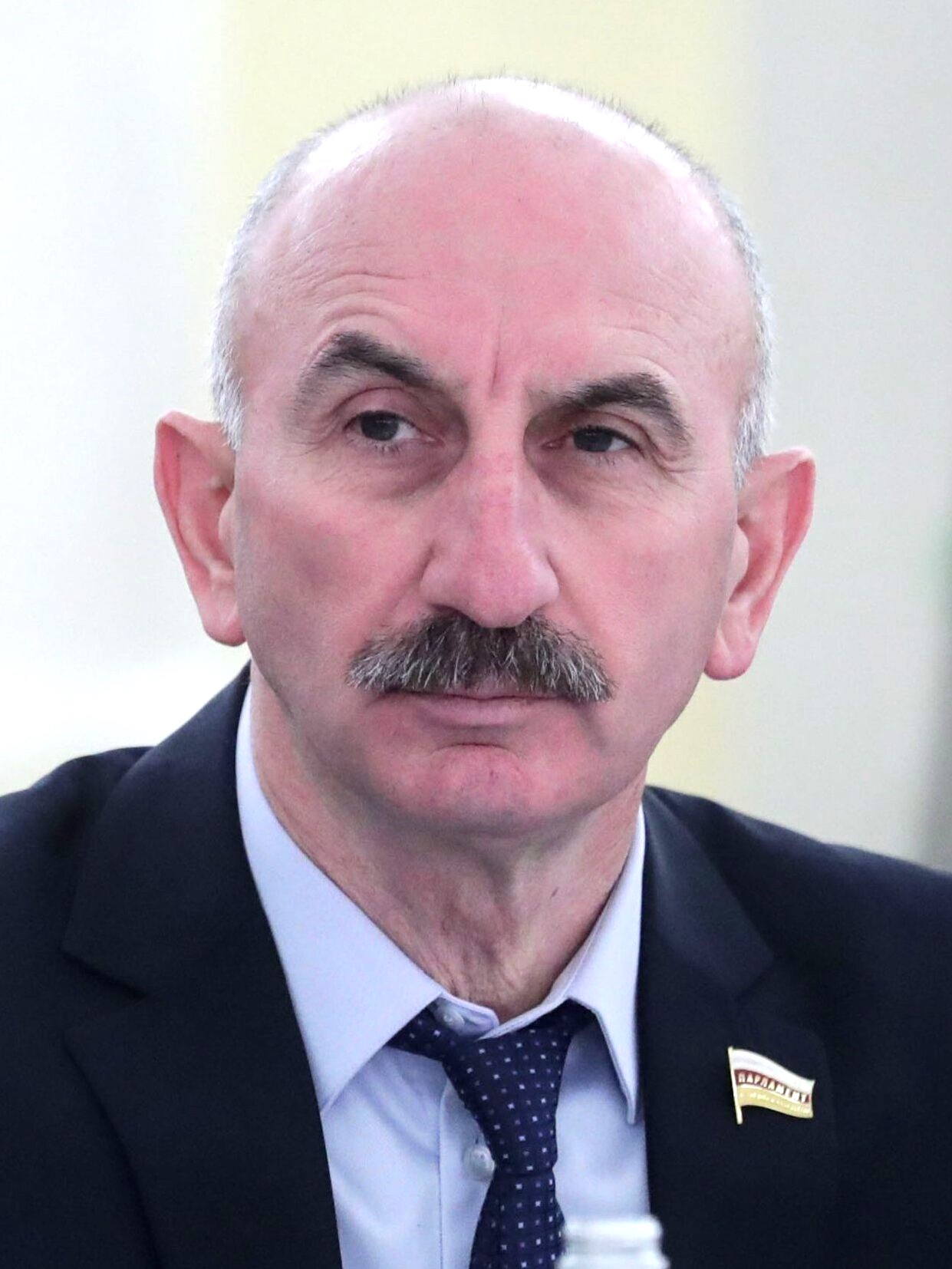
- Kelekhsaev in 2023

Leader of Unity of the People
- Incumbent
- Assumed office 2011
- Preceded by: position created

Member of the Parliament of South Ossetia
- In office 2014–2024

Vice Speaker of the Parliament
- In office 2019–2024

Head of the Java District
- In office 2012–2017

Personal details
- Party: Unity of the People

Vladimir Kelekhsaev (Russian: Владимир Келехсаев) is a South Ossetian politician. He has served as the chairman of the political party Unity of the People since its creation. Although not Russophobic, he, and Unity of the People, are Russoskeptic, believing Russian interest in South Ossetia as simply a means to control the small de facto independent republic. He promotes a policy of economic independence and pragmatic foreign policy.

== Political career ==
Unity of the People was created before the 2011 South Ossetian presidential election and Kelekhsaev stood as their candidate receiving 1,623 votes or 6.65% of the electorate. He did not advance to the second round of the election and endorsed eventual winner Alla Dzhioyeva. However, these election results would be annulled. Kelekhsaev attempted to run again during the 2012 South Ossetian presidential election, however, failed his Ossetian proficiency test and was disqualified. He would attempt to run for the 2022 South Ossetian presidential election, however, he would be disqualified from the ballot. In the 2014 South Ossetian parliamentary election Unity of the People received 2,790 votes or 13.81% of the electorate and Kelekhsaev was elected to parliament. He would be re-elected in the 2019 South Ossetian parliamentary election. During his time in parliament he participated in diplomatic talks with Abkhazia. Following his re-election in 2019 he was named the Vice-Speaker of Parliament.

Kelekhsaev has also served as the head of the Java District.

== Election results ==
Candidate	Party	First round		Second round	
Candidate	Party	Votes	%	Votes	%
Anatoliy Bibilov	Unity Party	6,066	24.86	10,462	40.88
Alla Dzhioyeva	Independent	6,052	24.80	14,828	57.95
Vadim Chovrebov		2,418	9.91		
Alan Kotaev		2,358	9.66		
Dmitriy Tasoev	Social Democratic Party	2,318	9.50		
Georgiy Kabisov		1,859	7.62		
Vladimir Kelekhsaev	Unity of the People	1,623	6.65		
Sergej Bitiev		815	3.34		
Soslan Tedety		275	1.13		
Alan Pliev		255	1.04		
Dzhemal Dzhigkaev		231	0.95		
Against all		134	0.55	299	1.17
Total		24,404	100.00	25,589	100.00
Source: RES, Kavkaz Uzel (second round 87% counted)
