= Vitaly Ikaev =

South Ossetian politician

Vitaly Zaurovich Ikaev
- Виталий Икоев

Member of the Parliament of South Ossetia for the 14th district
- In office 2019–2024
- Succeeded by: Andrey Zakharievich Bagaev

Personal details
- Party: United Ossetia

Vitaly Ikaev (Russian: Виталий Икоев) is an Ossetian politician from the partially recognized Caucasian republic of South Ossetia. (Note: All but 4 UN member states recognize South Ossetia as part of Georgia illegally occupied by Russia) He is a member of the United Ossetia party.

== Biography ==
Ikaev was elected in the 2019 election as a member of United Ossetia in District Nº 14.

Ikaev, as a member of the Parliament of South Ossetia, was chosen to be a member of their Presidium, and as such approved Konstantin Dzhussoev as Prime Minister. To this end he has denounced "illegal US military-biological activities in Ukraine" and has called for closer ties to the Russian and Belarusian governments. Additionally, the Presidium approved budgetary changes, and in 2021 Ikaev was part of an emergency meeting due to the Parliament's failure to pass a budget in time for state pensions to be paid. He took efforts to remodel the South Ossetian tax code to be a carbon copy of the Russian tax code, and to streamline the administration to be more in line with the Russian model of governance.

In 2023 as a member of the presidium Ikaev supported fundamental reforms to the South Ossetian judicial system, reforming the power of local judges, and the process of their appointments.

Ikaev is also the director of the National Bank of South Ossetia.

Ikaev did not stand for re-election in 2024, with his seat being won by Andrey Zakharievich Bagaev of Nykhas.
