= Zaza Driaev =

South Ossetian politician

Zaza Nodarovich Driaev

Member of the Parliament of South Ossetia
- Incumbent
- Assumed office 2019

Personal details
- Party: Political independent

Zaza Nodarovich Driaev is an Ossetian politician from the partially recognized Caucasian Republic of South Ossetia, which most of the UN recognizes as part of Georgia, occupied by Russia. Driaev is the chairman of the Parliamentary Committee on Foreign Policy and Interparliamentary Ties, and as such, determines much of the foreign policy of the Republic.

== Biography ==
Diraev was elected to the South Ossetian parliament in the 2019 election as a political independent, however, joined the governmental support of Anatoly Bibilov, despite refusing to join his United Ossetia party.

In 2019 Driaev was among the South Ossetian politicians who called on Georgian officials to take down a police post close to the de facto South Ossetian border, namely near the Ossetian controlled village of Tsnelisi, suggesting the South Ossetian KGB dismantle the post by force. However, despite South Ossetian protests over the police post supposedly being in South Ossetian territory, the post was well outside the administrative boundary of the former South Ossetian Autonomous Oblast, the territory the South Ossetians claimed. At the core of the dispute were differing interpretations between the Georgian and South Ossetians sides about the course of the boundary in this particular area. After an investigation by the European Union Monitoring Mission in Georgia the post was not removed, but the dispute itself remained unresolved. In 2020 Driaev caved to protesters in Tskhinvali that called for the resignation of the government of Gennady Bekoyev. Driaev announced that he was going to open a parliamentary investigation towards possible censure of the South Ossetian general prosecutor, the cause for the public's dissatisfaction with the government.

Driaev is the co-chairman of the Commission for Cooperation between the Federation Council and the Parliament of the Republic of South Ossetia, as well as the chairman of the Parliamentary Committee on Foreign Policy and Interparliamentary Ties. In these capacities he met with a delegation of Russian politicians, led by Grigory Karasin, that visited South Ossetia in 2023 to mark the 15th anniversary of Russia's recognition of South Ossetia's independence.

As Foreign policy chairman, Driaev was tasked with establishing a committee to explore possible Belarusian recognition of South Ossetian independence, after the issue was introduced by Alan Tekhov and approved by Alan Alborov. Additionally, he urged the rest of parliament to follow a Russian Duma decree that the United States must end its embargo on Cuba, as well as denounce the death of civilians in the Gaza war.

In November 2023, Driaev, alongside Sarmat Ikoev, went on a state visit to North Ossetia to meet with their parliament over implementing matching laws on "Physical Culture and Sports" in both North and South Ossetia.
