= David Sanakoev =

South Ossetian military officer and politician

- Санахъоты Дауыт; Давид Санакоев
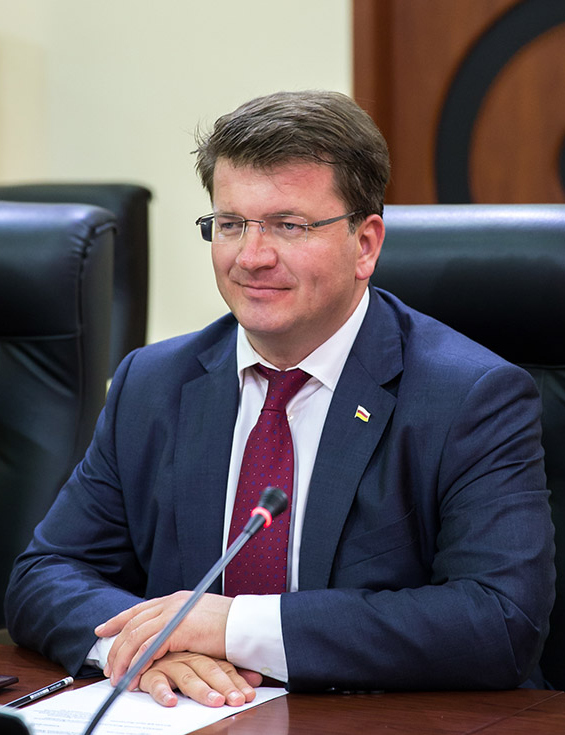
- Sanakoev in 2014

Member of the Parliament of South Ossetia
- In office 2019–2024

2nd Minister of Foreign Affairs
- In office 30 May 2012 – 22 April 2015
- President: Leonid Tibilov
- Preceded by: Murat Dzhioev
- Succeeded by: Kazbulat Tskhovrebov
Political party leadership
Chairman of Nykhaz
In office June 2018 – February 2020
Preceded by	Ruslan Gagloyev
Succeeded by	Alan Gagloev
Chairman of New Ossetia
In office April 2012 – June 2018
Preceded by	Position established
Succeeded by	Position abolished

Commissioner for Human Rights
- In office 2004–2012
- Succeeded by: Inal Tasoev

Personal details
- Born: 14 December 1976 (age 49) Tskhinvali, Georgian SSR, Soviet Union
- Party: For Justice (2024-present)
- Other political affiliations: Independent (before 2012); New Ossetia (2012–2018); Nykhaz (2018–2024)
- Education: South Ossetian State Pedagogical Institute; RANEPA
- Occupation: Historian diplomat

Military service
- Branch/service: South Ossetia
- Years of service: 2004–2008
- Battles/wars: Russo-Georgian War; Battle of Tskhinvali

David Georgievich Sanakoev (Note: Also transliterated as Sanakoyev) (Note: Iron Ossetic: Санахъоты Джиуӕры фырт Дауыт, romanized: Sanaqoty Ǵiuæry fyrt Dauyt; Russian: Дави́д Гео́ргиевич Санако́ев) (born 14 December 1976) is an Ossetian separatist, indicted war criminal, politician, diplomat, and international fugitive, who served as Minister of Foreign Affairs of South Ossetia from 2012 to 2015, during the presidency of Leonid Tibilov.

== Early life ==
Sanakoev attended Tskhinvali secondary school No. 5 from 1982 to 1993. He then attended the South Ossetian State University, earning a degree in Finance and Credit in 1998. In 2008, he enrolled in the Russian Presidential Academy of National Economy and Public Administration and wrote a dissertation titled "The activities of public authorities to resolve refugee issues on the materials of North Ossetia-Alania."

Sanakoev is also the president of South Ossetia's Kyokushin-kan Karate-do Federation.

== Professional career ==
Sanakoev worked as a consultant to the Children's Fund of the Republic of South Ossetia from 1998 to 2000. From 2000 to 2001, he worked for an organization named Era as a consultant on refugee issues. From 2001 to 2002, he worked as an advisor to the Agency for the Motivation of Society and Social Development. From 2002 to 2004, he worked as an assistant for the Agency for Socio-Economic and Cultural Development.

In 2004, he began working for the Armed Forces of South Ossetia as the Deputy commander for the Separate Mountain Company which was under the jurisdiction of the Armed Forces' Ministry of Defense and Emergency Situations. His commander was Bestauta Bala Ivanovich. Simultaneously, starting in 2004 he began working as the Presidential Representative for Human Rights for president Eduard Kokoity. During his time in this capacity, he oversaw what the South Ossetian government called the "evacuation of children" from Tskhinvali. Sanakoev has been deemed responsible for the illegal kidnapping and imprisonment of 110 Georgian civilians, mostly children and the elderly, of which 27 were confirmed to have died due to neglect and poor conditions, with another 38 missing to this day.

Following the conclusion of the war, Sanakoev released the 45 surviving prisoners. He has worked for Ossetia Accuses and the Organization of Ossetian Communities Sandizan since 2008, both of which accuse Georgia of committing war crimes. He has worked for the United Nations as a South Ossetian representative to the discussions on a non-violent resolution to the frozen conflict, as well as for discussions on refugees and missing persons.

== Political career ==
=== 2012 election ===
Sanakoev ran as a candidate in the 2012 South Ossetian presidential election. He campaigned on a platform of government reform, wishing to sever ties between the government and big business, creating directly elected district heads, and make ministerial positions be held accountable to parliament He advanced to the second round after narrowly beating Moscow-backed Dmitry Medoyev with 6,627 votes to Medoyev's 6,415, making the election the first without a Russia-endorsed candidate. He went on to get 12,439 votes, or 43.64% of the electorate, well short of Tibilov's 15,786 votes or 55.38% of the electorate. Despite this, Tibilov named Sanakoev his foreign minister on May 30, 2012

=== 2014 election ===
Hoping to keep his political platform of reformism alive, Sanakoev founded the New Ossetia political party immediately after his defeat in 2012 to participate in the 2014 South Ossetian parliamentary election. Sanakoev immediately tempered expectations for the party during its foundation, and the party went on to win 6.27% of the vote, but zero seats in parliament. As minister of foreign affairs, he leaked a draft treaty between Russia and South Ossetia, which would have resulted in the annexation of the republic by Russia, to Georgian media. The treaty had already been redrafted by that point, without the annexation clause. Sanakoev lost a no confidence vote on 13 March 2015, which, according to Radio Free Europe/Radio Liberty, was motivated as retaliation by Bibilov for Sanakoev having leaked the draft treaty to the media. Sanakoev was removed from office on 22 April 2015. After this incident, Sanakoev was labeled as "nationalist" and "pro-Georgian" by Valery Kaziyev, then head of the Communist Party of South Ossetia. In response to these accusations, Sanakoev sued Kaziyev for libel.

=== 2019 election ===
In the 2017 election, pro-Russian Anatoly Bibilov was elected president and introduced new bureaucratic hurdles for opposition parties, namely needing to register a party before every election, with his office determining which parties can and cannot be re-registered. New Ossetia found itself in the latter category. As the two parties platforms were similar, Sanakoev merged New Ossetia into Nykhaz and was elected its chairman in June 2018. Shortly after, in 2019 he was joined by the Alanian Union led by Alan Gagloev. As chairman, Sanakoev oversaw the party's efforts in the 2019 South Ossetian parliamentary election. During the election, the party doubled its popular vote, but failed to gain any new seats, although Sanakoev won a seat. In the February 2020 party leadership election, which he did not attend, Sanakoev was replaced by Gagloev, who became the party's candidate for president in the 2022 South Ossetian presidential election, and went on to win.

=== 2024 election ===
Sanakoev remained a member of parliament for Nykhaz until 11 April 2024, when he was one of the founders of the newly formed party For Justice alongside two other MPs, Harry Muldarov and Dzambolyt Medoev. All three of them had their Russian citizenship revoked for supporting creating a "state border" between South Ossetia and Georgia. The group would be joined by two more MPs, Andrei Maldzihov and Amiran Diakonov, as well as the controversial former leader of the Leningor district Soslan Gabaraev. On 6 May 2024, the South Ossetian Central Election Commission, reported that For Justice would not be allowed to stand for the election, the party protested releasing a statement that "The ruling party 'Nykhas' blatantly disregards the law" and that "The election campaign is conducted outside the boundaries of both law and decency."

== ICC indictment ==
On 24 June 2022, Sanakoev was indicted by the International Criminal Court due to his aforementioned detention of 110 ethnically Georgian civilians, mostly consisting of elderly women and children. Combined with the fact the poor conditions he placed them under resulted in the proven deaths of at least 27 of them, the ICC found that he violated article 49 of the Fourth Geneva Convention.

== Awards and medals ==
- : In Commemoration of the 15th Anniversary of the Republic of South Ossetia - 2006
- (South Ossetia) : Participant of the peacekeeping operation in Pridnestrovie - 2007
- "For Service in Guarding Peace in South Ossetia" - 2008, 2010
- (South Ossetia) : Bulavin uprising 300th anniversary jubilee cross - 2008
- (South Ossetia) : Regimental badge of General Baklanov - 2009
- (South Ossetia) : Silver Cross of the Orenburg Cossack Society - 2010
- (South Ossetia) : For Faith and Fatherland -2010
- (South Ossetia) : Golden Badge of Honor in Public Recognition - 2011
