= 2022 in South Ossetia =

- Decades: 2000s; 2010s; 2020s
- See also: Other events of 2022; Timeline of South Ossetian history

Events in the year 2022 in South Ossetia.

== Incumbents ==
- President: Anatoly Bibilov (until 24 May); Alan Gagloyev onwards
- Prime Minister: Gennady Bekoyev (until 20 June); Konstantin Dzhussoev onwards

== Events ==
- 30 March – The President of South Ossetia, Anatoly Bibilov, declares that the partially recognised state will undertake "legal steps" in the near future for accession to become part of Russia.
- 30 March – On a televised address, President Anatoly Bibilov declared that he would take legal steps towards a referendum on the territory joining the Russian Federation.
- 31 March – Georgia says plans by the breakaway state of South Ossetia, which is internationally recognized as occupied Georgian territory, to hold a referendum on becoming a part of Russia are "unacceptable".
- 10 April – First round of the 2022 South Ossetian presidential election.
- 8 May – Second round of the 2022 South Ossetian presidential election
- 24 May – Alan Gagloyev is elected President.
- 30 May – President Alan Gagloyev declares plans to hold a referendum on joining Russia have been suspended.
