= Alanian Union =

Alanian Union Аланский союз ახალი ოსეთი
- Leader: Alan Gagloev
- Founded: 2017
- Dissolved: 2019
- Merged into: Nykhaz
- Headquarters: Tskhinvali
- Ideology: Anti-corruption; Government reform Ossetian nationalism
- Political position: Right-wing
- Colours

Alanian Union was a minor political party that existed in the partially recognized Caucasian republic of South Ossetia following the 2017 South Ossetian presidential election to its merger into Nykhaz for the 2019 South Ossetian parliamentary election.

== History ==
The party was founded by former member of Parliament of South Ossetia, Alan Gagloev, following his defeat in the 2017 election. The party's platform was largely just Gagloev's personal political beliefs; Anti-corruption, Government Reform, and Ossetian nationalism.

In the lead up to the 2019 South Ossetian parliamentary election, Anatoly Bibilov's government introduced a new law which required every party to be re-registered before every election, with the government having a final say if a party can exist, allowing Bibilov to effectively control the opposition. Gagloev made the decision in early 2019 to follow David Georgievich Sanakoev's New Ossetia in merging with the ideologically similar Nykhaz.
