= Alexander Chochiev =

South Ossetian politician

Chairman of the South Ossetian Customs Committee
- Incumbent
- Assumed office 2022

Personal details
- Party: Nykhaz

Alexander Chochiev is a South Ossetian politician that has served in the cabinet of President Alan Gagloev as the chairman of the Customs Committee.

== Biography ==
Chochiev served as the head of the customs committee of South Ossetia, where he sought to totally restructure the committee to have more younger employees. One of the most pressing issues that the customs committee faced during Chochiev's tenure was the smuggling of ethyl alcohol and other alcohol products from Russia to bypass dues. Chochiev stated that in December 2023 25 thousand liters had been imported from North Ossetia. He also noted that a similar crisis occurred in 2022 when industrial ethyl alcohol was smuggled into South Ossetia, processed into medical grade alcohol, and exported it back to Russia. Chochiev threatened to sue the Federal Customs Service of Russia due to their inaction.

Chochiev has been a vocal opponent of a proposed Russian measure to open South Ossetia to Georgian transit to allow Georgia and Russia to increase trade ties, stating that any efforts by the Russians towards this goal have not been discussed with the South Ossetian government. At around the same time Chochiev and Konstantin Dzhussoev proposed increasing tariffs on Russian goods.

As the head of the Customs Committee, Chochiev has been the face of most of the criticism to president Alan Gagloev's customs reforms. Namely, the Russian government announced the abolition of customs duties on goods entering South Ossetia, however, Gagloev and Chochiev reiterated that the South Ossetian duties had not changed and announced that all goods will still have to be searched at the border. Chochiev also denounced entrepreneurs protesting the lack of change on the South Ossetian side as "unfounded and provocative."

Chochiev and the South Ossetian government would eventually cave to the Russian government and repeal the duties on Russian goods, but still maintained the bans on large amounts of commodities, such as carbonated soft drinks. The government also blamed the growing discontent on a Georgian conspiracy, working with Russian businessmen to increase the cost of living in South Ossetia.
