= Zita Besayeva =

South Ossetian politician

Zita Grigorievna Besayeva
- Зита Бесаева

Chairwoman of Nykhaz
- Incumbent
- Assumed office February 2023
- Preceded by: Alan Gagloev

Member of the Parliament of South Ossetia
- Incumbent
- Assumed office 2014

Personal details
- Born: 17 June 1976 (age 49) Tskhinval, South Ossetian AO, Georgian SSR, Soviet Union
- Children: 3
- Occupation: Lawyer

Zita Grigorievna Besayeva (born 17 June 1976) is a South Ossetian politician who has been a member of the Parliament of South Ossetia since 2014. Following the election of Alan Gagloev as President of South Ossetia, she has served as the chairwoman of the ruling Nykhaz party since February 2023.

== Biography ==
=== Early life ===
Zita Besayeva was born in 1976 in Tskhinval then in the South Ossetian AO which was part of the Georgian SSR, a member republic of the Soviet Union. She graduated from the South Ossetian State University as part of their class of 1998 with a degree in history. She would also continue to study at the State University, earning a degree in law in 2002.

=== Political career ===
Starting in 2001 she would work as a consultant to Committee on Foreign Policy, Defense and Security of the Parliament of South Ossetia as well as the Parliament's legal department. In July 2002 she was named the head of the Parliament's legal department and retained her leadership role when the department transformed into "the control and legal department" on July 15, 2009.

She was one of the first candidates from Nykhaz to be elected to parliament in the 2014 South Ossetian parliamentary election. In 2016 she lobbied for the creation of a Constitutional Court, to give the judicial branch of the Republic actual power. The Constitutional Court had existed on paper since the 2001 rewriting of the constitution, however, citing financial shortfalls, was never created. The Constitutional Court has been modeled after the Supreme Court of the United States, and as such the prior pro-Russian administrations had put off creating the institution. While in parliament she would serve as the head of the commission on compliance with regulations and won re-election in the 2019 South Ossetian parliamentary election. During her tenure in parliament, Besayeva has been the only women in the 34 member parliament.

At the sixth Nykhaz party congress in February 2023, Besayeva was selected to replace outgoing party chairman Alan Gagloev, as the President cannot also be the chairman of a political party.

== Personal life ==
Besayeva is married and has three sons.
