= Minister of Foreign Affairs (South Ossetia) =

Part of the Cabinet of South Ossetia

The Minister of Foreign Affairs is a member of the South Ossetian cabinet and the head of the Ministry of Foreign Affairs. The current Minister is Akhsar Dzhioev.

== History ==
THe office was created on May 28, 1992 during the First Ossetian War during a session of the Supreme Council of the Republic of South Ossetia as the Ministry of External Relations. The following day, May 29, South Ossetia unilaterally declared its independence from the no longer existent Soviet Union. (Note: South Ossetia declared its independence from Georgia on September 20, 1990, as the "South Ossetian Soviet Democratic Republic" within the Soviet Union, although the Soviet Union never recognized this.)

The Ministry played a major role in the negotiations to end the war and establish a joint Russian-Georgian peacekeeping mission. In 2002 the ministry was renamed to the Ministry of Foreign Affairs.

== List of foreign ministers ==
This is a list of foreign ministers of South Ossetia.

- Uruzhmag Dgioev - 1992-1994
- Dmitry Medoev (first)- 1994-1996
- Yuri Gagloyty - 1996-1998
- Murat Dzhioev (first)- 1998-2012
- David Sanakoev 2012-2015
- Kazbulat Tskhovrebov - 2015-2016
- Murat Dzhioev (second)-2016-2017
- Dmitry Medoev (second)- 2017-2022
- Akhsar Dzhioev - 2022-present
