= List of speakers of the Parliament of South Ossetia =

Speakers of the Parliament of South Ossetia

List of speakers of the Parliament of South Ossetia. Until 27 November 1996, the speaker (or "chairman") of the parliament was also Head of State.

Below is a list of office-holders:

Name	Entered office	Left office
Lyudvig Chibirov	1993	1996
Kosta Georgievich Dzugaev	1996	1999
Stanislav Kochiev	1999	2004
Znaur Gassiyev	2004	9 June 2009
Stanislav Kochiev	9 June 2011	5 October 2011
Zurab Kokoyev (acting)	5 October 2011	2 July 2012
Stanislav Kochiev	2 July 2012	23 June 2014
Anatoliy Bibilov	23 June 2014	21 April 2017
Inal Mamiev	21 April 2017	7 June 2017
Pyotr Gassiev	7 June 2017	20 June 2019
Alan Tadtaev	20 June 2019	15 September 2022
Alan Alborov	15 September 2022	24 June 2024
Alan Margiev	24 June 2024	

== See also ==
- Heads of State of South Ossetia
