= Gassiev =

Gassiev is a surname. Notable people with the surname include:

- Murat Gassiev (born 1993), Russian boxer
- Pyotr Gassiev (born 1972), South Ossetian politician
- Znaur Gassiev (1925–2016), South Ossetian politician
