= Ossetia – Liberty Square =

Ossetia – Liberty Square Iryston - Saribardzinady Fazuat
- Russian name: Осетия – Площадь Свободы
- Leader: Alla Dzhioyeva
- Founder: Alla Dzhioyeva
- Founded: May 17, 2012,
- Registered: September 5, 2012
- Dissolved: 2019; 6 years ago
- Merged into: Nykhaz
- Ideology: Ossetian nationalism; Anti-Establishment; Reformism
- leanings: pro-Tibilov

Ossetia – Liberty Square was a political party in the from the partially recognized Caucasian Republic of South Ossetia, which most of the UN recognizes as part of Georgia, occupied by Russia. The party was established by longtime opposition figure, Alla Dzhioyeva, when her victory in the 2011 presidential election was annulled.

== History ==
At the party's founding congress on May 17, 2012, the party outlined themselves as pro-administration, at the time meaning pro-Tibilov, who won the 2012 presidential election due to the invalidation of Dzhioyeva. The party stated that their express goal was the promotion of political, economic, social reforms on a vaguely anti-establishment platform. Tibilov fostered the creation of several smaller political parties to support his presidency, the most famous of which is Nykhaz, with each of them hoping he would eventually join their party, although he chose to remain independent. The founding congress also stated that the party was built upon "professional" and "patriotic" individuals and adopted district heads, a logo, and anthem. The party saw support from Dzhambolat Tedeyev, who attended the founding congress, although he never officially joined the party. Also attending the opening congress, and congratulating the party, was Stanislav Kochiev, the longtime head of the Communist Party of South Ossetia, Yuri Dzitssuty, then vice-speaker of the Parliament of South Ossetia, and Tarzan Kokoiti, an MP for the Unity Party.

Ossetia – Liberty Square was officially registered as a political party on September 5, 2012, by Dzhioyeva as a continuation of the nearly year long protest her and her supporters initiated when the Supreme Court of South Ossetia invalidated her election as president in 2011.

Dzhioyeva was the education minister of Eduard Kokoity from 2002 to 2008 when she was fired and arrested for fraud and official misconduct and was sentenced to a 24-month suspension and a fine of ₽120,000. Due to this she was seen as a surrogate vote for Kokoity's opponents in 2011, after Kokoity resigned due to his willingness to be open to a rapprochement from the Georgian government, coupled with the legal ambiguity on his ability to run for a third term. Dzhioyeva had been a vocal opponent of Kokoity since her firing.

The party is largely a political vehicle for Dzhioyeva's own positions, which center around the political and economic self-sufficiency of South Ossetia. One of the first positions they took was the promotion of a special commission to investigate police officers for abuses of power. Dzhioyeva would go on to be named Tibilov's deputy prime-minister for social affairs in 2012, serving in the capacity until she quit in 2014, largely retiring from politics, although the party was never formally disestablished, with Dzhioyeva using it to organize support for a few key issues and to denounce scandals.

Dzhioyeva would come out of her soft-retirement, merging Ossetia – Liberty Square into Nykhaz in time for the 2019 parliamentary election, where Dzhioyeva would be elected to parliament on Nykhaz's list.
