= New Ossetia =

New Ossetia Новая Осетия ახალი ოსეთი
- Leader: David Sanakoyev
- Founded: 2012
- Dissolved: 2018
- Merged into: Nykhaz
- Headquarters: Tskhinvali
- Ideology: Anti-corruption; Government Reform; Russoskepticism
- Political position: Centrism
- Colours

New Ossetia was a minor political party that existed in the partially recognized Caucasian republic of South Ossetia following the 2012 South Ossetian presidential election to its merger into Nykhaz for the 2019 South Ossetian parliamentary election.

== History ==
The party was founded by David Sanakoyev following his defeat in the 2012 South Ossetian presidential election to Leonid Tibilov, who would name him his foreign minister on May 30, 2012. The party's goal was to continue Sanakoyev's political message into the 2014 South Ossetian parliamentary election Immediately, he tempered expectations for the party but laid out the party's platform as follows:

- Forbid bureaucrats to be engaged in business activities
- Make heads of ministries and departments be made accountable to parliament
- Improve local government systems
- Direct elections for district administrators
- Strengthen the economy by creating an industrial base

Despite the party winning 6.27% of the vote in the 2014 election, they won zero seats. Later in 2014 South Ossetia and Russia where in the process of drafting a treaty of cooperation, which in the original drafts included South Ossetia being annexed by Russia. New Ossetia and Sanakoyev leaked the original draft to Georgian media, and came out against Russian annexation, but clarified that the newer renditions of the treaty did not include the provision. Sanakoyev would be removed from office following a vote of no confidence on March 13, 2015 officially for failing to attend two parliamentary sessions and would be removed from office on April 22, 2015, ending the party's representation in the government. Unofficially it was retaliation for leaking of the draft treaty to Georgian media. After this incident the party was labeled as "nationalist" and "pro-Georgian" by Valery Kaziyev, then head of the Communist Party of South Ossetia. In response to these accusations Sanakoyev sued Kaziyev for libel.

The party was barred from participating in the 2019 South Ossetian parliamentary election in June 2018 due to an increase in bureaucratic hurdles for parties to re-register for every election. Due to this, the party merged into Nykhaz which largely shared the same platform, and was joined shortly after by Alanian Union.

== Election results ==
Party	Votes	%	Seats	+/–
United Ossetia	9,083	44.97	20	New
Unity of the People	2,790	13.81	6	New
People's Party of South Ossetia	1,915	9.48	4	–5
Nykhaz	1,574	7.79	4	New
New Ossetia	1,267	6.27	0	New
Unity Party	1,219	6.04	0	–17
Communist Party of South Ossetia	890	4.41	0	–8
Homeland	802	3.97	0	New
Fatherland Socialist Party	658	3.26	0	0
Total	20,198	100.00	34	0
Valid votes	20,198	95.85		
Invalid/blank votes	874	4.15		
Total votes	21,072	100.00		
Registered voters/turnout	35,133	59.98		
Source: RES
