= Ruslan Gagloyev =

South Ossetian Politician

Chairman Ruslan Gagloyev

Member of Parliament

Undersecretary of the Security Council of South Ossetia

Leader of Nykhaz
- Preceded by: Alan Alborov
- Succeeded by: David Georgievich Sanakoev

Personal details
- Party: Nykhaz

Ruslan Gagloyev is an Ossetian politician from the partially recognized Caucasus Republic of South Ossetia.

== Career ==
He served as the Undersecretary of the Security Council of South Ossetia during the Russo-Georgian War. He served as the leader of the political party Nykhaz during the 2014 South Ossetian parliamentary election and was the party's candidate for president during the 2017 South Ossetian presidential election.
