= Alan Alborov =

Alan Alborov may refer to:

- Alan Alborov (politician) (born 1976), South Ossetian speaker of parliament
- Alan Alborov (footballer) (born 1989), Russian footballer
