= Vyacheslav Gobozov =

South Ossetian Politician

Chairman Vyacheslav Gobozov

Chairman of the Fatherland Socialist Party
- Incumbent
- Assumed office May 31, 2009

Chairman of the State Committee for Information and the Press
- In office 19 April 2012 – 21 April 2017

Member of the Parliament of South Ossetia
- In office 1999–2004

Member of the Parliament of South Ossetia
- In office 1990–1994

Personal details
- Party: Fatherland Socialist Party
- Occupation: Political analyst

Vyacheslav Gobozov is a South Ossetian politician who has been the Chairman of the Fatherland Socialist Party since its inception for the 2009 South Ossetian parliamentary election. He is one of the leading figures in the South Ossetian anti-Russian opposition. However, he is also a staunch Ossetian nationalist and supports the Republic's independence and maintains a pragmatic approach to when and where to oppose and accept Russian support.

== Political career ==
=== Early career ===
Gobozov began his political career as a member of the Parliament of South Ossetia for the first and third convocation (1990 to 1994 and 1999 to 2004). During his time in parliament he would be an independent which was common prior to the 2004 South Ossetian parliamentary election.

=== 2009 election ===
Gobozov founded the Fatherland Socialist Party in order to participate in the 2009 South Ossetian parliamentary election during which his party got 6.53% of the vote and zero seats in parliament. Due to the fact not a single anti-Russian party won a seat in parliament, Gobozov decried the election's integrity. Saying:

"If this election was free and fair then the ruling party would not get a majority and our party would get about 35-40 percent of votes, or about 10 or 11 seats in parliament"

=== Post 2009 ===
Immediately after the 2009 election Gobozov tried, and failed, to rally a united opposition against the Russophile government of Eduard Kokoity in order to challenge him in the 2011 South Ossetian presidential election. However, he was unable to run as he did not meet the 10-year residency requirement to run for president. Kokoity's challenger, Alla Dzhioyeva, would go on to win, however the Republic's court declared that the independent grass-roots fueled political movement she led had committed electoral fraud and that Kokoity was the real winner.

Following the 2009 election, Gobozov has been one of the loudest anti-Russian voices in South Ossetia. In 2013 he spoke out against leading members of the Ossetian diaspora in Moscow, namely against Gocha Dzasokhashvili who had called South Ossetia Samachablo, the Georgian term for South Ossetia, while also calling for warming of relations between South Ossetia and Georgia.

=== State Committee for Information and the Press ===
He served as President Leonid Tibilov's Chairman of the State Committee for Information and the Press from 2012 to 2017. His first major act was in 2013 when he supported the President's denial of allowing the International Committee of the Red Cross access into the country on the grounds of the organizations inefficiency.

In 2014 he came out in support of a treaty with Russia which would place the Armed Forces of South Ossetia under de facto Russian control and make the borders between Russia and South Ossetia more transparent. His support for the treaty stemmed from the economic bonuses. However, he denounced the fact the treaty was being created behind closed doors and will not be reviewed by the people of South Ossetia.

In 2016 and 2017 Gobozov supported renaming the official name of South Ossetia to Republic of South Ossetia – the State of Alania, but decried the lack of an official referendum and the lack of public consultation on the wording of the official name of the republic.

=== Lecturer ===
Following his departure from the government he has worked as a political analyst and as the senior lecturer of the Department of Political Science and Sociology at the South Ossetian State University and gave a lecture to the visiting staff of the Donetsk National University. In his lecture he decried Georgia's monopoly over information regarding the Russo-Georgian War and South Ossetia's sovereignty.

In 2020 he supported renaming Tskhinvali to Stalinir not because of any ideological reason, but because that is the name that most inhabitants of the city already use and it is a symbol of South Ossetian identity.

In 2021 during the political crisis of that year that followed the Murder of Inal Djabiev, which saw 14 members of the 32 member parliament refused to attend sessions, effectively paralyzing government, he stated that this was not the first crisis of this type. He went on to say that whenever prior crisis came political reforms where promised that never ended up being implemented.

=== Gagloev's advisor ===
On December 4, 2023, Gobozov was named a state advisor to President Alan Gagloev. However, in the build up to the 2024 election the South Ossetian Central Election Commission refused to verify their national list, citing a lack of signatures. On June 2, 2025 Gagloev fired Gobozov.
