= 2014 South Ossetian parliamentary election =

← 2009	8 June 2014	2019 →
- 34 seats in the Parliament; 18 seats needed for a majority
Party	Leader	Vote %	Seats	+/–
United Ossetia	Anatoly Bibilov	44.97	20	New
Unity of the People	Vladimir Kelekhsaev	13.81	6	New
People's Party	Alexander Pliev	9.48	4	−5
Nykhaz	Ruslan Gagloyev	7.79	4	New
This lists parties that won seats. See the complete results below.
Prime Minister before	Prime Minister after
Domenty Kulumbegov; Independent	Domenty Kulumbegov; Independent

Parliamentary elections were held in South Ossetia on 8 June 2014. The result was a victory for the United Ossetia party, which won 20 of the 34 seats in the Parliament.

== Results ==
Party	Votes	%	Seats	+/–
United Ossetia	9,083	44.97	20	New
Unity of the People	2,790	13.81	6	New
People's Party of South Ossetia	1,915	9.48	4	–5
Nykhaz	1,574	7.79	4	New
New Ossetia	1,267	6.27	0	New
Unity Party	1,219	6.04	0	–17
Communist Party of South Ossetia	890	4.41	0	–8
Homeland	802	3.97	0	New
Fatherland Socialist Party	658	3.26	0	0
Total	20,198	100.00	34	0
Valid votes	20,198	95.85		
Invalid/blank votes	874	4.15		
Total votes	21,072	100.00		
Registered voters/turnout	35,133	59.98		
Source: Cominf
