= Pyotr Gassiev =

South Ossetian politician

- Пётр Гассиев; Петр Гасситы

Speaker of the Parliament
- Incumbent
- Assumed office 7 June 2017
- Preceded by: Inal Mamiev
- Succeeded by: Alan Tadtaev

Personal details
- Born: 18 June 1972 (age 54) Tskhinvali, Georgian SSR, Soviet Union
- Party: United Ossetia

Pyotr Leonidovich Gassiev (Russian: Пётр Леонидович Гассиев, Iron Ossetic: Петр Леониды фырт Гасситы; born 18 June 1972) is a South Ossetian politician who served as the Speaker of the South Ossetian Parliament from 7 June 2017 until 20 June 2019.
