= Social Democratic Party of South Ossetia =

Social Democratic Party
- Leader: Dmitry Tasoev
- Founder: Dmitry Tasoev
- Founded: 2010
- Dissolved: 2014
- Merged into: United Ossetia
- Ideology: Social democracy (nominal); Russophilia; Ossetian nationalism
- Political position: Centre-right

The Social Democratic Party of South Ossetia was a political party from the partially recognized caucasian Republic of South Ossetia, which the United Nations considers to be part of Georgia.

== History ==
The party was founded by Dmitry Tasoev in 2010 as part of his campaign for the 2011 South Ossetian presidential election, however, shortly after the party's foundation it was declared an illegal organization by the South Ossetian government. Despite this, the party continued to operate, holding a congress and officially electing Tasoev as party leader and approving other candidates. The party centered their campaign on governmental inaction, as the party was largely ideologically in-line with the ruling party. Despite the party not being allowed to legally operate, Tasoev was still able to register as a presidential candidate and ultimately got 9.50% of the electorate, or 2,318 votes and did not advance to the second round. Despite the group's name, they are not traditional social democrats, instead advocating for Tasoev's personal political ideals, which is anti-monopoly, anti-establishment, and pro-Russian. Tasoev has been an outspoken ally of Anatoly Bibilov and in 2014 merged the Social Democratic Party into Bibilov's party, United Ossetia.
