= Fatherland Socialist Party =

Political party in North and South Ossetia

Fatherland Socialist Party Фыдыбӕстӕ Социалистическая партия Отечества სამშობლოს სოციალისტური პარტია
- Leader: Vyacheslav Gobozov
- Founded: 1993 (original); 2007 (reformed)
- Dissolved: 2004
- Headquarters: Tskhinvali
- Ideology: Socialism; Ossetian nationalism; Anti-Ingush sentiment; Decentralization
- Political position: Left-wing
- Regional affiliation: A Just Russia – For Truth
- Colours: Green
- Parliament: 0 / 34

The Fatherland Socialist Party (Iron Ossetic: Фыдыбӕстӕ; Russian: Социалистическая партия Отечества; Georgian: სამშობლოს სოციალისტური პარტია), also known as the Socialist Party "Fatherland" or Fatherland, is a minor opposition political party in South Ossetia and the Russian republic of North Ossetia–Alania. The party is led by Vyacheslav Gobozov, former head of the committee for information during the administration of Anatoly Bibilov. They position themselves as socialist and have been considered a marginal radical party for their entire existence.

== History ==
The Fatherland Socialist Party was originally founded in 1993 by Vadim Baskayev, who had been removed from the nationalist Adæmon Tsædis movement after he publicly supported the 1991 Soviet coup attempt. Located on the fringe of local politics, the party took a hardline stance in regards to the East Prigorodny conflict, arguing that it was impossible for Ossetians and Ingush to live together, and further supported increasing the powers of the government of North Ossetia–Alania. During the 1995 Russian regional elections the party won no seats in the Parliament of the Republic of North Ossetia–Alania.

The party was denied registration by the Central Election Committee during the 2004 South Ossetian parliamentary election, and subsequently dissolved. It reformed itself in South Ossetia in 2007. The party's current incarnation is closely related to A Just Russia – For Truth.

The party participated in the 2009 South Ossetian parliamentary election being notable for being the only anti-Russian party to stand for election. They would come in a distant fourth place with 6.53% of the vote and no seats in Parliament. After the election, party leadership would go on to claim that the Pro-Russian parties rigged the election in their favor to prevent any meaningful opposition entering parliament.

The party would go on to stand during the 2014 South Ossetian parliamentary election garnering 3.26% of the vote and the 2019 South Ossetian parliamentary election receiving 3.20%. In the 2024 election the party did not stand a national list, but rather one single candidate in one single district, who earned 134 votes, or 10.57% of the district in a distant 5th place.

== Election results ==
=== Parliament ===
Election	Votes	%	Seats	+/–	Leader
2009	2,918 (#4)	6.53	0 / 34	—N/a	Vyacheslav Gobozov
2014	658 (#9)	3.26	0 / 34	▼3.27	Vyacheslav Gobozov
2019	711 (#6)	3.20	0 / 34	▼0.06	Vyacheslav Gobozov
2024	134 (#8)	0.69	0 / 34	▼2.51	Vyacheslav Gobozov
