= Alla Dzhioyeva =

South Ossetian politician (born 1949)

- Джиоты Аллæ; Алла Джиоева
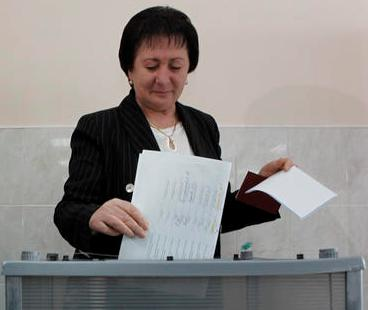
- Dzhioyeva in 2011

Member of the Parliament of South Ossetia
- In office 2019–2024

Education Minister of South Ossetia
- In office February 2002 – 4 February 2008

Deputy Prime Minister of South Ossetia
- In office 23 May 2012 – 2014

Personal details
- Born: 23 August 1949 (age 77) Staliniri, South Ossetian AO, Georgian SSR, Soviet Union (now Tskhinvali, South Ossetia)
- Party: Independent (before 2012); Ossetia – Liberty Square (2012-2019); Nykhaz (since 2019)
- Education: Odessa University

Alla Aleksandrovna Dzhioyeva (Note: Iron Ossetic: Джиоты Алыксандыры чызг Аллӕ, romanized: Džioty Alyksandyry čyzg Allæ, pronounced [d͡ʒiˈotɘ alɘkˈsandɘrɘ t͡ʃɘʒg ˈallɐ]; Russian: Алла Александровна Джиоева, romanized: Alla Aleksandrovna Džiojeva, pronounced [ˈallə ɐlʲɪkˈsandrəvnə dʐɨˈojevə]) (born 23 August 1949) is a South Ossetian politician, who is currently Deputy Prime Minister in the South Ossetian government. She previously served as the Education Minister in 2002–2008. She won the 2011 presidential election, but the Supreme Court annulled the results, alleging that electoral fraud had been committed.

== Early life ==
Alla Dzhioyeva was born on August 23, 1949, in Staliniri, South Ossetian AO, Georgian SSR, Soviet Union (now Tskhinvali, South Ossetia). Having graduated from Ttskhinvali's secondary school № 5, she entered the South Ossetian Pedagogical Institute in 1967, but later transferred to Odessa University, which she finished in 1974 with a degree in philology. Dzhioyeva then returned to Tskhinvali to work as a Russian language and literature teacher in school № 2. She eventually became the school's director, occupying this position until 2002.

== Minister of education ==
In 2001, Dzhioyeva became a supporter of Eduard Kokoity, one of the candidates in the 2001 presidential election. Having won it, Kokoity appointed Dzhioyeva to be education minister in February 2002. Under her leadership, South Ossetia became more integrated into the Russian system of education: the South Ossetian teachers could be trained in Russia, spaces were allocated in Russian post-secondary institutions for South Ossetian students. On the other hand, Dzhioyeva refused any form of cooperation with Georgia, including the offers of aid. Nevertheless, the country's Georgian language schools continued to function. Dzioyeva is also credited with launching an experimental project to introduce the Ossetic language immersion classes in some schools. Dzhioyeva has been a vocal supporter of reunification of South and North Ossetia; in 2006, she became involved in an intergovernmental group for further integration of the two republics.

=== Criminal prosecution ===
Dzhioyeva was fired by Kokoity on February 4, 2008. The following day, she was charged with several offences and placed under house arrest on March 28. She remained detained until April 29, 2010, when a court found her guilty of fraud and official misconduct, but absolved her of two other charges. She received 24 months' probation and was fined 120,000 rubles. Dzhioyeva appealed to the Supreme Court; the current status of the appeal is unknown. Dzhioyeva has continuously maintained that her arrest and prosecution were politically motivated after she became a vocal critic of Kokoity.

== 2011 presidential election ==
Dzhioyeva remained an outspoken critic of Kokoity in 2010–2011 and decided to run in the 2011 presidential election. Its first round took place on November 13 with Dzhioyeva running against 10 other candidates, including Anatoliy Bibilov, who carried the backing of both Kokoity and the Kremlin. Bibilov and Dzhioyeva secured 25.44% and 25.37% of the votes respectively and advanced to the runoff.

The second round took place on November 27. According to the preliminary results, Dzhioyeva secured 56.74% of the votes, while Bibilov received 40%. At that point, the South Ossetian Supreme Court ordered the Central Electoral Commission not to publish the results, acting on the Bibilov's Unity Party's complaints of electoral fraud. On November 29, the court annulled the election and barred Dzhioyeva from running in the next one.

Amidst the ensued political crisis, Dzhioyeva announced that due to the fact she had received the most votes, she was president-elect. She formed a state council to serve as the new government of South Ossetia, and her supporters took to the streets in protest of the sanctions taken against her. During one of the demonstrations, Dzhioyeva obtained the protocols from the Central Electoral Commission, confirming Dzhioyeva to be the winner.

Dzhioyeva and her supporters demanded Kokoity's resignation and international recognition of Dzhioyeva's victory, while her supporters engaged in demonstrations on Tskhinvali's central square. At the same time, she entered into negotiations with the president; representatives from Russia acted as mediators.

On December 9, the sides reached an agreement, which includes Kokoity's resignation, with the prime minister Vadim Brovtsev becoming the acting president until the next election is held on March 25, 2012; Dzhioyeva was allowed to contest it.

Dzhioyeva announced her withdrawal from the deal in January 2012, condemning the planned runoff as "illegal" and saying she was planning to hold her inauguration as president on February 10. Acting president Vadim Brovtsev accused her of trying to plot a coup d’état. On February 9, 2012, South Ossetian police raided her office, trying to take her into custody. As a result, she was hospitalized unconscious, reportedly suffering from a stroke. Her supporters claim she was hit with a rifle-butt. She remained in hospital for 45 days and was discharged, on March 24, 2012, under police guard.

== Recent career ==
On 23 May 2012, Dzhioyeva was appointed Deputy Prime Minister by decree of President Leonid Tibilov.

Dzhioyeva was elected to parliament in the 2019 election as a member of Nykhaz. She would not stand for re-election in the 2024 election.
