= Dmitry Medoyev =

South Ossetian politician (born 1960)

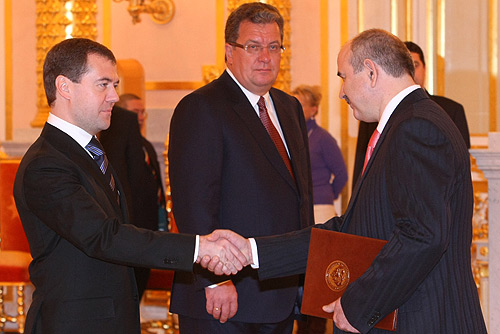
Dmitry Medoyev presents his diplomatic credentials to President of Russia Dmitry Medvedev on 16 January 2009.

Dmitry Nikolayevich Medoyev (Russian: Дмитрий Николаевич Медоев; born 15 May 1960) is a former foreign minister of South Ossetia. Previously, he was the Ambassador of South Ossetia to the Russian Federation. Previous to recognition of South Ossetian independence by Russia on 26 August 2008, he was the secessionist envoy to Moscow for the Republic of South Ossetia. He was widely cited during the 2008 South Ossetia War on President Eduard Kokoity's position on the August 8 invasion, and has since been involved in negotiating Georgia's presumed territorial sovereignty over the region.

Medoyev presented his diplomatic credentials to Grigory Karasin, the Russian Deputy Minister of Foreign Affairs, on 13 January 2008, and to President of Russia Dmitry Medvedev on 16 January 2009. He was dismissed in 2015.

From 2017 until 2022, he was the South Ossetian foreign minister.
