= Unity of the People (South Ossetia) =

Unity of the People Дзыллӕйы иудзинад Единство народа ხალხის ერთიანობა
- Leader: Vladimir Kelekhsaev
- Founded: 2011
- Headquarters: Tskhinvali
- Ideology: Russophilia
- Colours
- Parliament: 0 / 34

The Unity of the People (Iron Ossetic: Дзыллӕйы иудзинад; Russian: Единство народа; Georgian: ხალხის ერთიანობა, romanized: khalkhis ertianoba) is a nationalist political party in South Ossetia, a partially recognized Caucasian republic considered by most countries to be part of Georgia. The party is led by Vladimir Kelekhsaev.

== History ==
In 2015, then-South Ossetian president Leonid Tibilov proposed a referendum on the annexation of South Ossetia into Russia. Unity of the People issued a press release calling for such a referendum to take place immediately, stating that annexation was the "dream of a generation."

=== 2017 election ===
During the 2017 election, the party's candidate, Alan Kozonov, was denied registration by the Central Election Commission (CEC) for failing to submit the required number of signatures.

=== 2019 election ===
At the party's 2019 congress, members focused on agricultural issues. Chairman Vladimir Kelekhsaev stated: "The most important thing today is bringing attention to agricultural issues; it is necessary to determine the fertility of the land, which will allow the development of horticulture, viticulture, and cattle raising. Today, 90% of agricultural products are imported from Russia. We must be self-sufficient.”

=== 2022 election ===
During the 2022 election, the party's longtime leader and founder, Vladimir Kelekhsaev, stood as the party's presidential candidate, announcing that the party's platform would "rally and work for the benefit of the people and Ossetia" and mostly focused on budget overruns and governmental deadlock. He also claimed that the South Ossetian state was only functioning due to extensive bankrolling by the Russian government, and that South Ossetia should instead be self-sufficient with a positive budget.

Shortly after Russia's recognition of the Donetsk and Luhansk People's Republics in February 2022, Unity of the People congratulated the move and officially sent congratulations to the republics' governments.

Kelekhsaev was eventually disqualified by the CEC and unable to participate.

=== 2024 election ===
Unity of the People held its conference for the 2024 South Ossetian parliamentary election on April 12, 2024. At the conference, the party named five candidates to its party list; Alan Tekhov, Alan Dzhussoev, Mikhail Tedeev, Igor Kuleba, Mikhail Dogguzov, and Roman Kabisov. Additionally, the party named its candidates for the single-mandate districts; Ibrahim Kelekhsayev, Harry Tsandiata, Zaury Gabaraev, Inal Gabaraev, Sergey Tadtayev, Soslan Bestayev, Alan Khachyrov, Vladimir Kelekhsaev, Arthur Khugaev, Julia Babugidze, and Tinatin Khubulova. Before the election, the party's chairman Sergey Pukhaev listed the parties platform to the State Information Agency. Stating that the central part of the party's campaign was the claim that the state did not have a functioning system of checks and balances and instead operated largely at the whim of the president. Additionally Pukhaev stated that the party would seek to reduce the cost of mortgages and call for annexation into Russia. Pukhaev also called for reform to the voting system, reducing the 7% barrier to entry for the proportional vote, and returning to the mixed majority-proportional system pre-2019, where the entire parliament was determined by proportional vote.

Going into the election, the party was part of the ruling minority government of Nykhaz with 3 seats in parliament. However, the party only got 918 votes in the proportional vote, or 4.2%, with another 961 votes in the single-mandate districts, winning no contests and losing all its seats. The party has gone on to become some of the most vocal critics of Nykhaz and their administration, especially after corruption allegations surfaced. On May 2, 2026, Vladimir Kelekhsaev, who has again taken leadership of the party, called on President Alan Gagloev to resign due to the corruption scandal.
