= 2017 South Ossetian presidential election =

- 9 April 2017
- Turnout: 79.63%
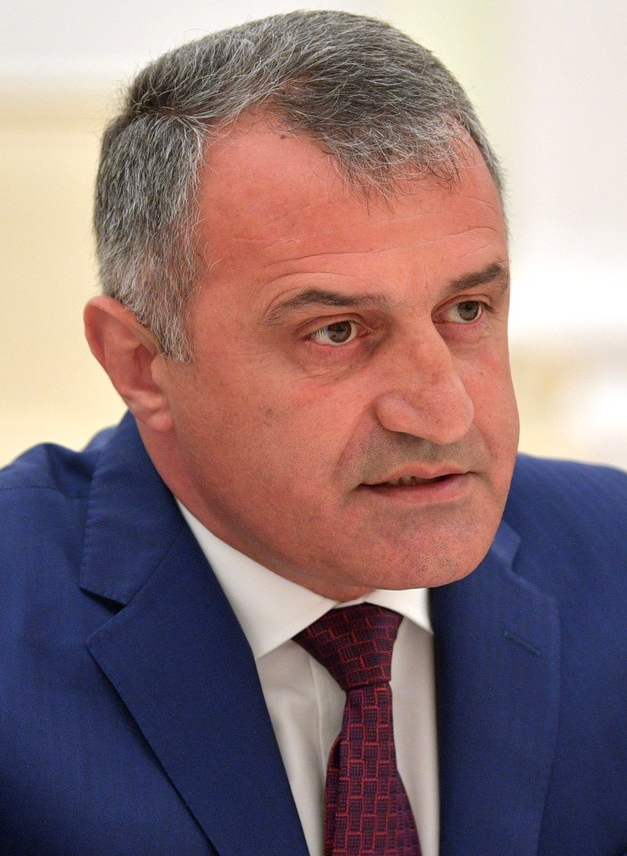

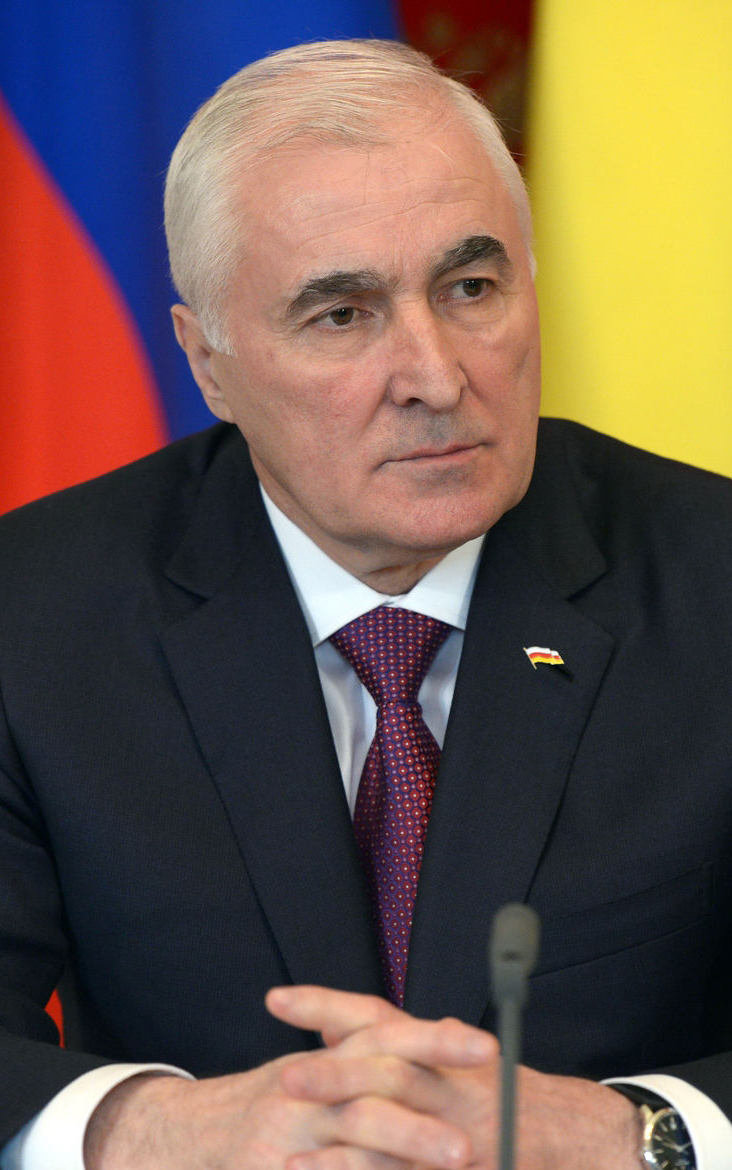

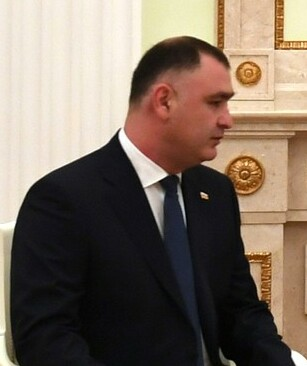
Nominee	Anatoly Bibilov	Leonid Tibilov	Alan Gagloev
Party	United Ossetia	Independent	Independent
Popular vote	17,736	10,909	3,291
Percentage	54.80%	33.71%	10.17%
President before election
Leonid Tibilov
Independent
Elected President
Anatoly Bibilov
United Ossetia

Presidential elections were held in South Ossetia on 9 April 2017 alongside a referendum on changing the official name of the state to "Republic of South Ossetia–the State of Alania", or "South Ossetia–Alania" for short. Incumbent President Leonid Tibilov ran for a second and final term in office, but was defeated by Anatoly Bibilov of the United Ossetia party.

== Background ==
The date was set by Parliament on 18 January 2017.

== Candidates ==
- Leonid Tibilov, President of South Ossetia since 2012
- Anatoly Bibilov, Speaker of Parliament
- Alan Gagloev, former KGB officer

=== Disqualified candidates ===
- Eduard Kokoity, President of South Ossetia from 2001 until 2011. His candidacy was rejected due to the Central Electoral Commission finding that he did not meet the residency requirements; a candidate must live in South Ossetia for at least nine months of the year in the ten years preceding an election. The decision to disqualify Kokoity led to several protests in Tskhinvali, though the decision was not amended.
- Amiran Bagayev, construction company owner
- Alexander Pliyev, deputy speaker of Parliament for Unity of the People.
- Ruslan Gagloyev, member of parliament, leader of Nykhaz
- Garry Muldarov, member of parliament
- Dmitry Tasoyev, former member of parliament

== Opinion polls ==
Date	Pollster	Tibilov	Bibilov	Gagloev	Against all	Undecided
Date	Pollster	Independent	United Ossetia	Independent	Against all	Undecided
9 April 2017	Election	33.7%	54.8%	10.2%	1.3%	0%
4 April 2017	South Ossetia Research Institute	40.7%	23.6%	19.9%	–	15.8%

== Results ==
The final result had Bibilov well out in front with 55% of the vote.

Candidate	Party	Votes	%
Anatoly Bibilov	United Ossetia	17,736	54.80
Leonid Tibilov	Independent	10,909	33.71
Alan Gagloev	Independent	3,291	10.17
Against all		429	1.33
Total		32,365	100.00
Valid votes		32,365	95.72
Invalid/blank votes		1,447	4.28
Total votes		33,812	100.00
Registered voters/turnout		42,459	79.63
Source: South Osetia
