= Alan Gagloyev =

President of South Ossetia from 2022 to 2026

- Гаглойты Алан
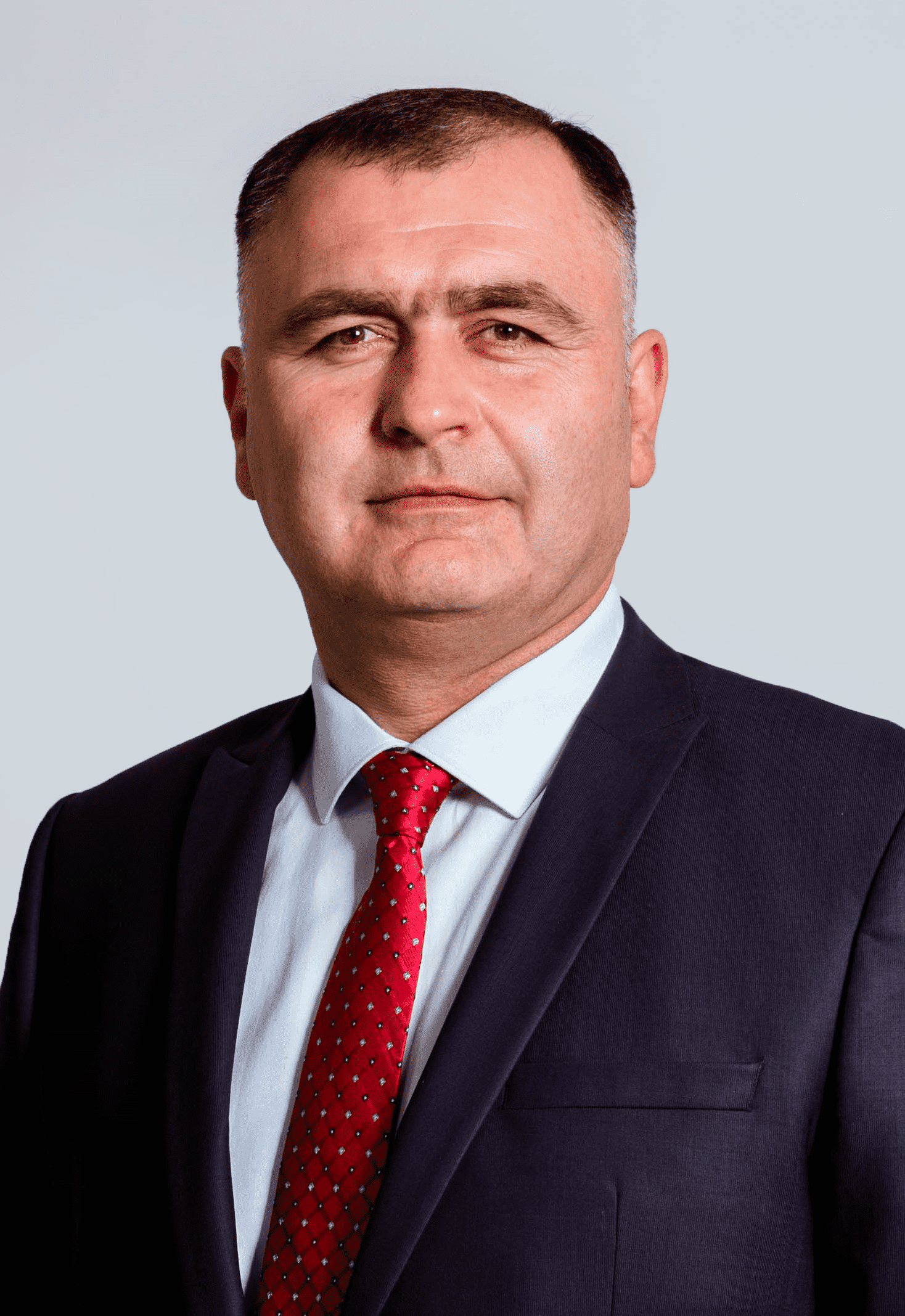
- Official portrait, 2022

Adviser to the President of Russia
- Incumbent
- Assumed office 23 June 2026
- President: Vladimir Putin

5th President of South Ossetia
- In office 24 May 2022 – 23 June 2026
- Prime Minister: Gennady Bekoyev; Konstantin Dzhussoev; Dzambolat Tadtayev; Konstantin Dzhioev (acting); Marat Kambolov
- Preceded by: Anatoly Bibilov
- Succeeded by: Marat Kambolov

Chairman of Nykhaz
- In office February 2020 – February 2023
- Preceded by: David Sanakoev
- Succeeded by: Zita Besayeva

Chairman of Alanian Union
- In office September 2017 – January 2019
- Preceded by: Position established
- Succeeded by: Position abolished

Personal details
- Born: 6 February 1981 (age 45) Tskhinvali, South Ossetian AO, Georgian SSR, USSR
- Party: Nykhaz
- Children: 2
- Education: South Ossetian State University
- Occupation: Politician

Alan Eduardovich Gagloyev (Iron Ossetic: Гаглойты Эдуарды фырт Алан, romanized: Gaglojty Edwardy fyrt Alan; Russian: Алан Эдуардович Гаглоев; born 6 February 1981), also transliterated as Gagloev, is a South Ossetian politician and former intelligence officer who is currently serving an advisor to Russian president Vladimir Putin. He was the fifth president of South Ossetia from 2022 to 2026 and served as chairman of the Nykhaz party from 2020 to 2023.

== Early life ==
Alan Gagloev was born on 6 February 1981, in Tskhinvali. He graduated from the South Ossetian State University in 2002 and was hired by the Ministry of Economic Development of South Ossetia as the chief specialist of the department for supporting small and medium-sized businesses.

He fought in the Russo-Georgian War in 2008. During the war, Gagloev's family "suffered heavy losses".

== 2017 presidential campaign and joining Nykhaz ==
He ran unsuccessfully for president of South Ossetia in 2017, losing to Anatoly Bibilov. After his loss, he announced the creation of his own political party, the Alanian Union in September 2017. However, in May 2018, the South Ossetian Ministry of Justice refused to register the party. In January 2019, the Alanian Union joined New Ossetia who merged with the party Nykhaz. Gagloev went on to be elected chairman of Nykhaz in February 2020.

== 2022 presidential campaign ==
Gagloev ran for president a second time in the 2022 election. On 10 April 2022, he won the first round with 36.9% of the vote, passing incumbent president Anatoly Bibilov. Prior to the run-off, Gagloev received endorsements from the three candidates eliminated in the first round, Alexandr Pliyev, Garri Muldarov, and Dmitry Tasoyev, heading into the runoff against Bibilov. Bibilov had been endorsed by United Russia, the ruling party of Russia.

Gagloev defeated Bibilov in the run-off with 56.08% of the vote on 8 May 2022. Bibilov admitted defeat in the elections, congratulated Gagloev and wished him "successful work for the good of the people".

== Presidency ==
Following his election, he was sworn in as the new president on 24 May 2022. Domestically, Gagloev said the main issue of his presidency would be taking steps to improve the economy. Zita Besayeva was elected to replace him as leader of Nykhaz in February 2023.

=== Relations with Russia ===
Gagloev was seen by observers as being less supportive of holding a referendum to join Russia, saying that Russia was "still busy with other issues," in reference to the Russian invasion of Ukraine. The Kremlin Press Secretary Dmitry Peskov further stated on 24 May that in regards to the referendum, "No steps are being taken or planned by the Russian side connected with this." On 30 May 2022, Gagloev suspended the referendum called by his predecessor Bibilov until consultations with Russia are complete.

On 12 August 2022, Gagloev dismissed defense minister Vladimir Pukhaev due to an incident on 23 July 2022, which involved masked servicemen of the defense minister assaulting civilians in various locations throughout the region. Gagloev would assert his "supreme authority" over the armed forces after these events. This is after his predecessor had allowed parts of the South Ossetian military to be under the authority of the Russian army, as well as a large desertion by South Ossetians in the Russian invasion of Ukraine. During the early parts of the Russian invasion of Ukraine, tens of thousands of Russians fled the country to South Ossetia to avoid being drafted. Gagloev's government cooperated with Russian authorities to create screening centers on the border to make sure the drafted or eligible for the draft don't get into the country. However, the policy was ended in October 2022 after only 120 draft dodgers where caught, of an estimated immigrant population of 78,000.

On 12 March 2023, Gagloev personally awarded Ramzan Kadyrov's daughter Aishat Kadyrova, the South Ossetian Order of Friendship, stating that she had worked tirelessly to improve bilateral relations with Chechnya and South Ossetia.

In October 2023, Gagloev supported the Russian invasion of Ukraine, calling it a "Special military operation" and South Ossetia's "joint goal" with Russia. In March 2024, Georgia's Interpress News claimed that in 2023 President Gagloev expressed hope that the "republic" would join Russia soon.

On 17 March 2024, it was announced that several high ranking South Ossetian officials, namely speaker Alan Alborov and President Alan Gagloev, were entering talks with Russian officials for possible annexation into Russia by the end of the year. Vladimir Novikov, a specialist on the Caucasus at the Institute for Countries in the Commonwealth of Independent States stated that “At the present time, the inclusion of South Ossetia within Russia does not correspond to the interests of the Russian Federation since it could lead to the opening of a second front at a time of the special military operation” stating that South Ossetian annexation will only be considered if there was a drastic change in Georgian leadership in a pro-Western direction during the 2024 Georgian parliamentary election.

On 9 May 2026, Gagloev signed the "Treaty on the Deepening of Allied Interaction between the Russian Federation and the Republic of South Ossetia" with Russian president Vladimir Putin on a state visit to Moscow. The terms of the treaty oversees deeper co-operation between Russia and South Ossetia “to ensure regional peace and stability, and to pursue co-ordinated foreign, defence and security policies” and will take “further steps towards creating a unified economic space, improving living standards, and gradually introducing a common framework for foreign borrowing and foreign investment.” Gagloev described the treaty as “a step towards the reunification of the Ossetian people” stating it would help create a legal framework for South Ossetia's future ascension into the Russian federation. The treaty was ratified by the Russian parliament on 13 May. Georgia’s Foreign Minister Maka Botchorishvili condemned the treaty as "further steps toward the annexation of Georgia’s regions." Article two of the treaty stipulates that any Russian citizen can stand for election in South Ossetia, and vice versa, just days later the Russian newspaper Kommersant reported Marat Kambolov, the North Ossetian director of the Kurchatov Institute from 2021 to 2025, was the Kremlin's pick for the next leader of South Ossetia in the 2026 South Ossetian presidential election.

=== Relations with Georgia ===
While still campaigning, Gagloev visited the Akhalgori Municipality, which has a substantial Georgian population, and urged support for allowing residents to travel to Georgia more freely. This had previously not been possible without medical documentation, and was further complicated by the COVID-19 pandemic. After assuming office, Gagloev received criticism from Russian news anchor Sergey Karnaukhov for dismissing the referendum to join Russia as well as supporting easier travel to Georgia, accusing him of being an American and Georgian asset. The governments of both Georgia and South Ossetia denied these claims. Beginning in August 2022, South Ossetia announced it would open checkpoints with Georgia from the 20th to the 30th of each month. Gagloev was subject to another scandal when he appointed Anatoly Pliyev as the Secretary of the Security Council when it was revealed that Pliyev had met with Ilia II of Georgia, which had been denounced by prior South Ossetian governments as “the ideologist of Georgian fascism” who “blessed Georgians to kill Ossetians.” However, this also caused tension in Georgia, as Georgian businessman, Gocha Dzasokhashvili, who previously headed the Assembly of the Peoples of Georgia in Russia, brokered the meeting between Pliyev and Ilia.

=== Domestic policy ===
After spending his entire political career up to his election as an opposition figure against the repressive government of Anatoly Bibilov, who used his office of president to crush political dissident and shut down opposition parties, including Gagloev's own Alanian Union, Gagloev was accused of using his power as president to target Bibilov and his supporters ahead of the 2024 elections. Oleg Gagloev, Alan Gagloev's minister of justice, stated that Bibilov's party, United Ossetia, might be suspended due to failing to properly fill out campaign finance forms at the end of 2022 after multiple warnings. United Ossetia's chairman, and speaker of Parliament Alan Tadtaev, called the threats "stupid" as suspending United Ossetia would cause a governmental collapse as United Ossetia has 14 of the 34 seats in Parliament. Tadtaev would be pressured to resign as speaker shortly after and was replaced by Alan Alborov, a member of Gagloev's Nykhaz.

Corruption allegations emerged almost immediately as Gagloev had promised using South Ossetia's cash reserves to pay transportation and hospital workers bonuses during his campaign. However, once in office, these pay raises never came. The government cited an overall downturn in the South Ossetian economy as it seeks fiscal independence, however, Gagloev's opposition claims that he pocketed the money to use in the 2024 elections as a campaign chest.

==== Dzhussoev government (2022–2026) ====
Gagloev named Konstantin Dzhussoev, who holds a monopoly on South Ossetia's construction industry, as his Prime Minister who has no experience with either politics or working in government. This has led to concerns about conflicts of interest with government funds for construction. Additionally, Dzhussoev's relationship to Albert Dzhussoev, one of the wealthiest men in the republic, has drawn criticism. Gagloev appointed Valery Gazzaev as his minister of Internal Affairs, an "experienced” and “professional” former head of the security department who has worked in law enforcement since 1997 and is one of the few members of the cabinet without family relationships to Gagloev. However, Gagloev named a relative, Oleg Gagloev, as his minister of justice who was formerly Anatoly Bibilov's chief of staff, but was fired in 2020. In 2021 Bibilov's government opened a corruption investigation into Oleg and Landa Abaeva, the head of accounting at the time, for five million missing roubles, however, after going in exile in Russia, in two months the Tskhinvali City Court ruled the investigation to be politically motivated and illegal. Alan Dzhioev has been appointed Gagloev's head of presidential administration who had previously been a judge of the constitutional court under Leonid Tibilov, however, he is Gagloev's son-in-law. There where also concerns due to his relationship with Arsen Gagloev, Alan's brother, who fled to Russia in 2011 and is a Gazprom executive. The aforementioned Anatoly Pliyev was named minister of the security council, and one of his first acts was dismissing the head of the State Security Committee, Major General Vladimir Khubaev, and his deputy Vasily Guliyev without giving a reason and named his close personal friend Alexander Tuaev as the new chairman.

Gagloev has also dismissed all four district heads, meaning that South Ossetia's devolved local governments have not been functioning since he took power. Over the course of Gagloev's tenure, inter-party rivalries started to develop as it emerged that supporters of Dzhussoev argued Gagloev's cabinet is largely stacked with yes-men and relatives. Gagloev sought to fix the long-running health crisis when he appointed health minister, Agunda Pliyeva, exasperated by entering a dispute with the hospital staff in Tskhinvali due to low pay and a brain-drain. The second leading issue was the poor state of the economy, which Gagloev appointed finance minister Kazbek Tsarikayev, the former finance minister of North Ossetia, to fix. However, Tsarikaev, due to his old age has been nicknamed "Biden" by locals due to his alleged dementia and due to his abrasive personality he turned most of the finance department against him. Gagloev's head of administration, Alan Dzhioev, implored Gagloev to keep Tsarikayev who went on to go on a state visit to Moscow to try and convince Russian officials that South Ossetia was operating under a surplus. Russia in turn sent auditors to Tskhinvali which found "serious irregularities" in South Ossetia's finances. At the same time there was a pay hold on public workers due to lack of funds. This perceived corruption has led to sporadic protests throughout Gagloev's term. South Ossetia had about 300 million roubles in deficit at the end of 2023. Additionally, Gagloyev has been accused of nepotism, as he was hopeful that his brother, Arsen Gagloyev, a Gazprom executive, would help convince the Russian government for more support, which in turn exposed financial irregularties, additionally, Dzhioev is Arsen's son-in-law and Tsarikaev is another of Gagloyev's relatives. The public, meanwhile, view Gagloyev as a puppet of Dzhioev and Pliyeva, which hasn't been helped by Gagloyev keeping them in his cabinet despite the scandals that both of them are embroiled in.

In 2023 South Ossetia would be embroiled in a crisis due to Gagloev and his customs minister, Alexander Chochiev, ending import/export duties with the Russian Republic, but with price of goods not decreasing. Additionally, Chochiev would strictly enforce preexisting import bans on some commodities, namely juice and soda and other sugary drinks, which led to discontent among the public. Gagloev's government would try to shift the blame for the issue on greedy businessmen collaborating with the Georgian Government to increase the cost of living in South Ossetia.

On 23 October 2023, Gagloev's government announced a serious shakeup in its composition, creating the Ministry of Labor and Social Protection, with Oleg Gagloev being removed from his post as Minister of Justice to become its first Minister, being replaced by Alan Dzhioev. Dzambolat Tadtayev was named the Minister of Finance, Sarmat Kotaev was named the Minister of Economic Development, and Alan Margiev was named the new head of Presidential Administration. The government also created a committee for the "Development of Tourism."

On 4 December 2023, Gagloev named Vyacheslav Gobozov, a long-time leader of the Fatherland Socialist Party which was the only anti-Russian opposition party allowed to participate in the 2009 election as his advisor. However, in the build up to the 2024 election the South Ossetian Central Election Commission refused to verify Fatherland's national list, citing a lack of signatures. On 2 June 2025 Gagloev fired Gobozov.

Gagloev again shook up his cabinet on 2 June 2025 besides the aforementioned Gobozov removal, Gagloev named Yuri Yarovitsky his minister of defense with Major General Inal Sabanov as his deputy, who previously held the position of Deputy Minister for Work with Personnel and as interim minister of defense. Colonels Vadim Tabuev and Akhsar Dzhioev where also named his deputies. Joni Kachmazov was fired as Minister of Agriculture being replaced by Vakhtang Mamitov. Lastly Thomas Dzhigkaev was fired as minister of health and replaced with Alla Chochieva.

Gagloev's government would be hit by its largest corruption scandal to date when, in January 2026, it was revealed by Communist Party MP Taimuraz Tadtaev that three billion roubles or ~39m United States Dollars had been misappropriated from Russian economic aid. Tadtaev also alleged that almost all of the money had been awarded by Dzhussoev to construction companies that he and his family owned. On 21 January, Gagloev dismissed Dzhussoev and most of his cabinet.

==== Tadtayev, Dzhioev, and Kambolov governments and resignation (2026) ====
Dzhussoev would be constitutionally replaced by his First Deputy Prime Minister and finance minister Dzambolyt Tadtayev. Tadtayev would be officially appointed the next prime minister on 11 February 2026. On 23 June 2026, Gagloev resigned as the President of South Ossetia to take up a position as an advisor to the Russian Government, particularly on the implementation of the "Treaty on the Deepening of Allied Interaction between the Russian Federation and the Republic of South Ossetia". This leaves Marat Kambolov the recently appointed former Chairman of the Government as Acting President of the Republic.

== Personal life ==
Gagloev is married and has two children.

Party political offices
Preceded by David Sanakoev	Chairman of Nykhaz; 2020–2023	Succeeded by Zita Besayeva
Political offices
Preceded by David Sanakoev	President of South Ossetia; 2022–2026	Incumbent
