= 2019 South Ossetian parliamentary election =

← 2014	9 June 2019	2024 →
- All 34 seats in Parliament; 18 seats needed for a majority
Party	Leader	Vote %	Seats	+/–
United Ossetia	Anatoly Bibilov	34.96	14	−6
People's Party	Amiran Diakonov	21.79	5	+1
Nykhaz	David Sanakoev	14.37	4	0
Unity of the People	Vladimir Kelekhsaev	12.96	3	−3
HIKP	Stanislav Kochiev	7.29	2	+2
Independents	–	–	6	New
This lists parties that won seats. See the complete results below.
Prime Minister before	Prime Minister after
Erik Pukhayev; Independent	Erik Pukhayev; Independent

Parliamentary elections were held in South Ossetia on 9 June 2019.

The ruling United Ossetia party lost its majority in parliament. Only three other elected members guaranteed their support if United Ossetia was to form a government, leaving it one seat short of a majority.

== Electoral system ==
A new electoral system was introduced prior to the elections, introducing a mixed electoral system, with 17 of the 34 seats elected by proportional representation in a single nationwide constituency, and the other 17 elected by first-past-the-post voting in single member constituencies. Between 2004 and 2014, all seats were elected by proportional representation.

== Results ==
Party	Proportional			District			Total seats	+/–
Party	Votes	%	Seats	Votes	%	Seats	Total seats	+/–
United Ossetia	7,778	34.96	7	4,713	24.17	7	14	–6
People's Party of South Ossetia	4,849	21.79	4	1,776	9.11	1	5	+1
Nykhaz	3,198	14.37	3	1,211	6.21	1	4	0
Unity of the People	2,883	12.96	2	2,139	10.97	1	3	–3
Communist Party of South Ossetia	1,622	7.29	1	1,263	6.48	1	2	+2
Fatherland Socialist Party	710	3.19	0	7	0.04	0	0	0
Unity Party	630	2.83	0			0	0	0
Homeland				272	1.40	0	0	0
Independents				6,993	35.87	6	6	+6
Against all	579	2.60	–	1,123	5.76	–	–	–
Total	22,249	100.00	17	19,497	100.00	17	34	0
Valid votes	22,249	95.28		19,497	94.94			
Invalid/blank votes	1,102	4.72		1,040	5.06			
Total votes	23,351	100.00		20,537	100.00			
Registered voters/turnout	35,254	66.24		33,954	60.48			
Source: CIKRUO, Respublika

=== By district ===
District Nº 1
Candidate	Party	Votes	%
Ivan Kazbekovich Slanov	Independent	481	27.74
Igor Ivanovich Kochiev	Communist Party of South Ossetia	319	18.40
Gennady Volodievich Tskhovrebov	United Ossetia	318	18.34
Zeldik Stepanovich Kelekhsaev	Unity of the People	180	10.38
Georgy Fedorovich Valiev	Independent	135	7.79
Roland Nodarovich Margiev	People's Party of South Ossetia	127	7.32
Mels Lentoevich Tedeev	Independent	89	5.13
Ruslan Vitalievich Doguzov	Homeland	25	1.44
Against all		60	3.46
Total		1,734	100.00
Valid votes		1,734	96.87
Invalid/blank votes		56	3.13
Total votes		1,790	100.00
Registered voters/turnout		3,019	59.29
Source: CIKRUO

District Nº 2
Candidate	Party	Votes	%
Anatoly Grigorievich Tadtaev	United Ossetia	294	24.20
Zemma Ivanovna Dzhagaeva	People's Party of South Ossetia	230	18.93
Dmitry Nikolaevich Tasoev	Unity of the People	210	17.28
Vitaly Vissarionovich Dzhioev	Independent	183	15.06
Oleg Ruslanovich Kozaev	Independent	81	6.67
Aleksandr Andreevich Gagiev	Communist Party of South Ossetia	70	5.76
Roland Lvovich Kelekhsaev	Independent	57	4.69
Against all		90	7.41
Total		1,215	100.00
Valid votes		1,215	96.05
Invalid/blank votes		50	3.95
Total votes		1,265	100.00
Registered voters/turnout		2,415	52.38
Source: CIKRUO

District Nº 3
Candidate	Party	Votes	%
Garri Vitalievich Muldarov	United Ossetia	508	43.49
Alan Nikolaevich Khugaev	People's Party of South Ossetia	281	24.06
Alan Amiranovich Chochiev	Unity of the People	140	11.99
Eduard Alekseevich Alborov	Independent	72	6.16
Igor Vladimirovich Pukhaev	Independent	71	6.08
Soslan Kazbekovich Chochiev	Communist Party of South Ossetia	33	2.83
Against all		63	5.39
Total		1,168	100.00
Valid votes		1,168	94.88
Invalid/blank votes		63	5.12
Total votes		1,231	100.00
Registered voters/turnout		2,250	54.71
Source: CIKRUO

District Nº 4
Candidate	Party	Votes	%
Artur Akakievich Tedeev	Independent	251	20.21
Alan Ivanovich Dzhigkaev	United Ossetia	193	15.54
Tarzan Arshakovich Kokoyti	Independent	173	13.93
Inal Ruslanovich Pliev	Communist Party of South Ossetia	161	12.96
Albert Dmitrievich Bagaev	Unity of the People	145	11.67
Iosif Alikhanovich Kokoev	Independent	98	7.89
Boris Nikolaevich Gagloev	Homeland	89	7.17
Against all		132	10.63
Total		1,242	100.00
Valid votes		1,242	93.03
Invalid/blank votes		93	6.97
Total votes		1,335	100.00
Registered voters/turnout		2,770	48.19
Source: CIKRUO

District Nº 5
Candidate	Party	Votes	%
Konstantin Georgievich Kisiev	Independent	259	23.81
Soslan Ivanovich Ostaev	Independent	208	19.12
Tamara Feliksovna Gabaraeva	Independent	150	13.79
Aleksey Vasilievich Khabalov	United Ossetia	136	12.50
Atsamaz Anzorovich Bestauty	People's Party of South Ossetia	96	8.82
Manana Sergeevna Dzhioeva	Independent	86	7.90
Nelli Semenovna Gogicheva	Independent	46	4.23
Garri Givievich Gabaraev	Communist Party of South Ossetia	44	4.04
Against all		63	5.79
Total		1,088	100.00
Valid votes		1,088	96.54
Invalid/blank votes		39	3.46
Total votes		1,127	100.00
Registered voters/turnout		1,960	57.50
Source: CIKRUO

District Nº 6
Candidate	Party	Votes	%
Malkhaz Nugzarovich Gagloev	Communist Party of South Ossetia	201	25.44
Alan Tarielovych Tadtaev	Independent	152	19.24
Yuri Mayramovych Beteev	Independent	139	17.59
Gino Tamazovich Tshovrebov	Independent	134	16.96
Mikhail Samsonovich Abaev	Unity of the People	63	7.97
Vitaly Denisovich Dzhioev	United Ossetia	49	6.20
Against all		52	6.58
Total		790	100.00
Valid votes		790	93.27
Invalid/blank votes		57	6.73
Total votes		847	100.00
Registered voters/turnout		1,512	56.02
Source: CIKRUO

Valery Tegaevich Kokoev was declared elected as he registered first as a candidate.

District Nº 7
Candidate	Party	Votes	%
Valery Tegaevich Kokoev	United Ossetia	216	28.76
Alan Taimurazovich Zasseev	Independent	216	28.76
David Vladimirovich Dzhioev	Independent	83	11.05
Khokh Soslanovich Sobaev	Independent	77	10.25
Larisa Artemovna Sanakoeva	People's Party of South Ossetia	73	9.72
Against all		86	11.45
Total		751	100.00
Valid votes		751	93.41
Invalid/blank votes		53	6.59
Total votes		804	100.00
Registered voters/turnout		1,365	58.90
Source: CIKRUO

District Nº 8
Candidate	Party	Votes	%
Alan Irbegovich Gagloev	Independent	615	36.69
Zhanna Gersanovna Kochieva	Independent	330	19.69
Leonid Kharitonovich Tibilov	Independent	325	19.39
Lyudvig Tuganovich Tskhovrebov	Independent	160	9.55
Mikhail Andreevich Doguzov	Unity of the People	74	4.42
Murat Sergeevich Gobozov	Independent	63	3.76
Against all		109	6.50
Total		1,676	100.00
Valid votes		1,676	96.38
Invalid/blank votes		63	3.62
Total votes		1,739	100.00
Registered voters/turnout		3,024	57.51
Source: CIKRUO

District Nº 9
Candidate	Party	Votes	%
Ibragim Khazbievich Valiev	Nykhaz	487	32.06
Yury Vladimirovich Dzagoev	United Ossetia	291	19.16
Veniamin Vladimirovich Gagloev	Independent	260	17.12
Rezo Aleksandrovich Ikoev	Independent	237	15.60
Against all		244	16.06
Total		1,519	100.00
Valid votes		1,519	92.06
Invalid/blank votes		131	7.94
Total votes		1,650	100.00
Registered voters/turnout		2,840	58.10
Source: CIKRUO

District Nº 10
Candidate	Party	Votes	%
Sarmat Nikolaevich Ikoev	Independent	462	36.81
Inal Ermakovich Bazzaev	Independent	235	18.73
Beslan Shotaevich Kotaev	People's Party of South Ossetia	196	15.62
Valery Muratovich Guliev	Independent	135	10.76
Mendik Feliksovich Lokhov	United Ossetia	113	9.00
Oleg Borisovich Bigulaev	Unity of the People	48	3.82
Against all		66	5.26
Total		1,255	100.00
Valid votes		1,255	94.72
Invalid/blank votes		70	5.28
Total votes		1,325	100.00
Registered voters/turnout		2,114	62.68
Source: CIKRUO

District Nº 11
Candidate	Party	Votes	%
Arsen Aslanovich Kvezerov	People's Party of South Ossetia	475	34.98
Alan Andreevich Tuaev	United Ossetia	435	32.03
Valiev Andreevich Otar	Unity of the People	113	8.32
Spartak Vadimovich Tomaev	Homeland	93	6.85
Admer Khetagovich Siukaev	Nykhaz	85	6.26
Dali Zaulovna Doguzova	Communist Party of South Ossetia	74	5.45
Albert Rolikovich Khugaev	Independent	65	4.79
Against all		18	1.33
Total		1,358	100.00
Valid votes		1,358	95.70
Invalid/blank votes		61	4.30
Total votes		1,419	100.00
Registered voters/turnout		2,000	70.95
Source: CIKRUO

District Nº 12
Candidate	Party	Votes	%
Ruslan Pavlovich Khudzhiev	Unity of the People	516	37.28
Inal Ivanovich Dzhioev	United Ossetia	352	25.43
Inal Georgievich Tskhovrebov	Independent	296	21.39
Gamlet Surenovich Tskhovrebov	Communist Party of South Ossetia	99	7.15
Tristan Dzhambolovich Karkusov	Homeland	65	4.70
Against all		56	4.05
Total		1,384	100.00
Valid votes		1,384	98.02
Invalid/blank votes		28	1.98
Total votes		1,412	100.00
Registered voters/turnout		2,357	59.91
Source: CIKRUO

District Nº 13
Candidate	Party	Votes	%
Vladimir Gelaevich Bazaev	United Ossetia	698	56.98
Sarmat Mukharovich Bitiev	Unity of the People	250	20.41
Anatoly Seseevich Khugaev	Nykhaz	78	6.37
Aleksey Mikhailovich Dzhioev	Independent	74	6.04
Amiran Nikolaevich Bagaev	People's Party of South Ossetia	71	5.80
Alan Slavikovich Zasseev	Communist Party of South Ossetia	43	3.51
Against all		11	0.90
Total		1,225	100.00
Valid votes		1,225	94.74
Invalid/blank votes		68	5.26
Total votes		1,293	100.00
Registered voters/turnout		1,772	72.97
Source: CIKRUO

District Nº 14
Candidate	Party	Votes	%
Vitaly Zaurovich Ikoev	United Ossetia	313	31.58
Alan Tamazovich Gobozov	Nykhaz	292	29.47
Dzambulat Khsarovich Dzhioev	People's Party of South Ossetia	172	17.36
Akhsar Sergeevich Chekhoev	Independent	145	14.63
Roland Filippovich Gabaraev	Unity of the People	48	4.84
Against all		21	2.12
Total		991	100.00
Valid votes		991	92.01
Invalid/blank votes		86	7.99
Total votes		1,077	100.00
Registered voters/turnout		1,527	70.53
Source: CIKRUO

District Nº 15
Candidate	Party	Votes	%
Dmitry Khsarbegovich Kotaev	United Ossetia	279	31.10
Elbrus Kazbekovich Tskhovrebov	Nykhaz	269	29.99
Ushang Mukhtarovich Kozaev	Communist Party of South Ossetia	142	15.83
Inal Alanovich Tasoev	Unity of the People	137	15.27
Makharbeg Efimovich Tedeev	Independent	52	5.80
Against all		18	2.01
Total		897	100.00
Valid votes		897	93.44
Invalid/blank votes		63	6.56
Total votes		960	100.00
Registered voters/turnout		1,497	64.13
Source: CIKRUO

District Nº 16
Candidate	Party	Votes	%
Zaza Nodarovich Driaev	Independent	298	51.38
Spartak Gersanovich Dryaev	United Ossetia	225	38.79
Aleksey Georgievich Sanakhoty	People's Party of South Ossetia	55	9.48
Against all		2	0.34
Total		580	100.00
Valid votes		580	96.35
Invalid/blank votes		22	3.65
Total votes		602	100.00
Registered voters/turnout		774	77.78
Source: CIKRUO

District Nº 17
Candidate	Party	Votes	%
Ilya Frangelovich Khubulov	United Ossetia	293	46.96
Eldar Nodarovich Akhmedov	Unity of the People	215	34.46
Gia Shotaevich Dryaev	Communist Party of South Ossetia	77	12.34
Vyacheslav Vladimirovich Dzhabiev	Fatherland Socialist Party	7	1.12
Against all		32	5.13
Total		624	100.00
Valid votes		624	94.40
Invalid/blank votes		37	5.60
Total votes		661	100.00
Registered voters/turnout		758	87.20
Source: CIKRUO
