= Nykhas =

Political party in South Ossetia

Nykhas Ныхас
- Leader: Zita Besayeva
- Founder: Alan Alborov
- Founded: 2013
- Merger of: New Ossetia (2018); Alanian Union (2019); Liberty Square (2019)
- Membership (2017): 790
- Ideology: Ossetian nationalism
- Colours: Dark blue
- Parliament: 10 / 34 (29%)

Website
- Facebook page

Nykhas (Iron Ossetic: Ныхас, lit. 'Meeting, Assembly') is a political party in South Ossetia founded in 2013 by supporters of Independent president Leonid Tibilov. Its members and supporters are referred to as Nykhasovites in local media.

== History ==
Nykhas's name is an homage to the Adamon Nykhas popular front which was established by Ossetian nationalists in 1988 advocating for greater separation of the South Ossetian Autonomous Oblast from the Georgian Soviet Socialist Republic during the Dissolution of the Soviet Union.

The party was founded by Alan Alborov, former mayor of Tskhinvali. By the 2014 South Ossetian parliamentary election, in which the party won four seats, the party's leader was Ruslan Gagloyev. Although officially an Independent, the party has been associated with then President Leonid Tibilov, with this association continuing even after him leaving office in 2017.

Gagloyev initially ran as the party's candidate for president in 2017. However, he would be disqualified and endorsed Tibilov. In the lead up to the 2019 South Ossetian parliamentary election the New Ossetia party led by David Sanakoyev, the Alanian Union led by Alan Gagloev, and the Ossetia – Liberty Square party led by Alla Dzhioyeva merged into Nykhas, with Sanakoyev becoming the new party leader. This resulted in the party almost doubling their vote from 7.79% to 14.37%, however, they failed to garner any more seats in Parliament. Gagloev would go on to be elected the chairman of the party in February 2020.

=== Rise to power ===
Gagloev would be the party's candidate for president in the 2022 presidential election and would defeat the incumbent President Anatoly Bibilov to become the fifth President of South Ossetia. Following his election Zita Besayeva was elected leader of the party in February 2023.

Under Gagloev's leadership the referendum on annexation into Russia was suspended until at least the end of the Russian invasion of Ukraine. Gagloev would also assert his "supreme authority" over the armed forces after units under the command of the defense minister assaulted Ossetian civilians throughout the country. This is after his predecessor had allowed parts of the South Ossetian military to be under the authority of the Russian army, as well as a large desertion by South Ossetians in the 2022 Russian invasion of Ukraine. He has also loosened regulations for the predominately ethnically Georgian residents of the Akhalgori Municipality to travel back and forth between Georgia and South Ossetia.

== Election results ==
=== Parliament of South Ossetia ===
Election	Leader	Votes	%	Seats	+/–	Status
2014	Ruslan Gagloyev	1,574	7.79% (4th)	4 / 34	New	Pro-presidential
2019	David Sanakoyev	3,198	14.37% (3rd)	4 / 34	0	Opposition
2024	Zita Besayeva	6,690	30.59% (2nd)	10 / 34	▲6	Government

=== Presidential ===
Election	Candidate	First round		Second round		Result
Election	Candidate	Votes	%	Votes	%	Result
2017	Endorsed Leonid Tibilov	10,909	33.71%			✗
2022	Alan Gagloyev	10,707	38.55%	16,134	56.09%	✓

== Party Chairmen ==
No.	Name	Term	Notes	Ref.
1.	Alan Alborov	2013 - 2014	Party's Founder, former mayor of Tskhinvali	
2.	Ruslan Gagloyev	2014 - June 2018	Member of Parliament, former Undersecretary of the Security Council of South Ossetia	
3.	David Sanakoev	June 2018 - February 2020	Presidential candidate in 2012, chairman of New Ossetia and foreign minister	
4.	Alan Gagloev	February 2020 - February 2023	Presidential candidate in 2017, chairman of Alanian Union elected president in 2022	
5.	Zita Besayeva	February 2023 - Incumbent	Founding member of the party, longtime member of parliament	
