= President of South Ossetia =

Head of state of the de facto independent republic

President of the Republic of South Ossetia
- Emblem of South Ossetia

- Flag of the president of South Ossetia

- Incumbent; Marat Kambolov since 23 June 2026
- Type: Head of state; Commander-in-chief
- Residence: Presidential Palace, Tskhinvali
- Term length: 5 years, renewable once
- Inaugural holder: Lyudvig Chibirov
- Formation: 27 November 1996; 29 years ago
- Website: presidentruo.org

The president of the Republic of South Ossetia (Iron Ossetic: Республикæ Хуссар Ирыстоны президент, Russian: Президент Республики Южная Осетия) is the head of state of the partially recognized Republic of South Ossetia that is de jure part of Georgia. This is a list of the de facto presidents of the Republic of South Ossetia and the holders of the precursor to the office.

== List of officeholders ==
=== List of First Secretaries of the Communist Party of South Ossetia ===
Name	Term of Office		Life years
Name	Start	End	Life years
Chairman of the Organization Bureau
Vladimir Sanakoyev	June 1918	July 30, 1918	1884–1937
Chairman of the Regional Committee of the Communist Party
Vladimir Sanakoyev	July 30, 1918	1920	1884–1937
First Secretaries of the Regional Committee of the Communist Party
Sergey Gagloyev	1921	1921	1896–1938
Vladimir Sanakoyev	1921	April 22, 1924	1884–1937
Aleksandr Dzhatiyev	1924	?	1891–1937
Sergey Kudryavtsev	1929	1930?	1903–1938
Isaak Zhvaniya	1932	1934?	?–1937
Boris (Abdul-Bekir) Tautiyev	1936?	1937	?–1937
Georgiy Gochashvili	1937	1938	1904–?
Vladimir Tskhovrebashvili	February 1938	January 1949	1905–1977
Akaky Imnadze	January 1949	May 1953	1908–?
Ivan Kudzhiashvili	May 1953	1954	1906–?
Grigory Sanakoyev	1954	1959	1914–?
Vladimir Kozayev	1959	1962	1917–?
Iosif Chiayev	1962	February 1965	1907–?
Georgy Dzhussoyev	February 1965	November 1973	1926–
Feliks Sanakoyev	November 1973	April 1988	1939–
Anatoly Chekhoyev	April 1988	January 1990	1950–
Valnin Tskhovrebashvili	January 1990	February 1991	1933–
Znaur Gassiyev	February 1991	August 1991	1925–

== List ==
Chairman of the South Ossetian People's Council

*1 Jun 1918 - May 1919     Aleksandr Arsenyevich Tibilov      (b. 1887 - d. 1937)  PSR

Chairmen of the Revolutionary Committee

- 23 Mar 1920 - 23 Jun 1920 Vladimir Davidovich Abayev (b. 1886 - d. 1964) RKP

                           (underground to May 1920, in rebellion at Roka 8 May – 7 Jun 1920)

- 25 Feb 1921 - Apr 1921 Vladimir Arzhevanovich Sanakoyev (s.a.) KPS-B

                           (in exile at Vladikavkaz, Soviet Russia to Mar 1921)

- Apr 1921 - 22 Apr 1922 Aleksandr Mikhaylovich Dzhatiyev (s.a.) KPS-B

Chairmen of the Central Executive Committee

- 22 Apr 1922 - 1924 Aleksandr Mikhaylovich Dzhatiyev (s.a.) KPS-B

                            (1st time)

- 1924 - 1928 Tasoltan (Vissarion) Bekuzarov KPS-B
- 1928 - Dec 1929 Aleksandr Mikhaylovich Dzhatiyev (s.a.) KPS-B

                            (2nd time)

- bf.1936 - 1937 Ivan Petrovich Dzhidzhoyev (b. 1904 - d. 1937) KPS-B
- 1937 - 1938 Vladimir Ivanovich Khubayev (b. 1905 - d.af.1946)KPS-B

Chairmen of the Executive Committee of the Soviet of People's Deputies

- 1938 - 1943 Vladimir Ivanovich Khubayev (s.a.) KPS-B
- Jul 1943 - 13 Apr 1948 Aleksandr Georgiyevich Galavanov (b. 1902 - d. 1986) KPS-B
- 13 Apr 1948 - 1953 Ilya Davidovich Kulukhov (b. 1901 - d.af.1961)KPS-B;1952 KPS
- 1953 - 1954 Grigoriy Georgiyevich Sanakoyev (s.a.) KPS
- 1954 - 1956 Vladimir Dmitriyevich Kozayev (s.a.) KPS
- 1956 - 1957 Iosif Semyonovich Chiayev (s.a.) KPS
- 1957 - 1959 Semyon Grigoryevich Tibilov (b. 1900 - d. 19..) KPS
- Dec 1959 - 196. V.G. Sanakoyev KPS
- 1961 - 1964 Vladimir Isaakovich Gazzayev (b. 1918 - d. 2008) KPS
- 1964 - Feb 1965 Georgiy Nikolayevich Dzhussoyev (s.a.) KPS
- Feb 1965 - 1972 Kosta Kargoyevich Dzhioyev (b. 1916 - d. 2005) KPS
- 1972 - Nov 1973 Feliks Sergeyevich Sanakoyev (s.a.) KPS
- Nov 1973 - Nov 1981 Genrikh Irakliyevich Mardanov (b. 1933) KPS
- Nov 1981 - May 1986 Tamara Shalvovna Kabulova (f) (b. 1938 - d. 2023) KPS
- May 1986 - 20 Sep 1990 Anatoliy Abramovich Kachmazov KPS
- 20 Sep 1990 – 16 Oct 1990 Feliks Mikhaylovich Zasseyev (b. 1945 - d. 2021) KPS

Chairman of the (to 28 Nov 1990, Provisional) Executive Committee

- 16 Oct 1990 – 10 Dec 1990 Torez Georgiyevich Kulumbegov (b. 1938 – d. 2006)

=== List of First Secretaries of the Communist Party of Ossetia ===
Name	Term of Office		Life years
Name	Start	End	Life years
First Secretaries of the Communist Party
Simon Takoyev	November 1924	1927	1876–1937
Kazbek Borukayev	1927	June 1928	1890–1931
Mikhail Pitkovsky	June 1928	1930	1897–1938
Moris Belotsky	1930	September 1931	1895–1944
David Demikhovsky	1931	September 9, 1934	1899–1938
Kazbek Butayev	September 9, 1934	February 1936	1893–1938
Genrikh Maurer	February 1936	July 21, 1937	1893–1938
Fyodor Kokov	July 21, 1937	November 1937	1900–1939
Vasily Lemayev (Note: Acting)	November 1937	1938	1902–?
Nikita Ivanov	1938	January 1940	1908–1977
Nikolay Mazin	January 1940	March 1944	1909–?
Kubady Kulov	March 1944	November 1953	1907–?
Vladimir Agkatsev	November 1953	August 5, 1961	1911–
Bilar Kabaloyev	August 5, 1961	January 15, 1982	1917–2009
Vladimir Odintsov	January 15, 1982	November 26, 1988	1924–2009
Aleksandr Dzasokhov	November 26, 1988	February 24, 1990	1934–
Akhsarbek Galazov	February 24, 1990	August 1991	1929–2013

=== Non-presidential heads of state ===
No.	Portrait	Name (Birth–Death)	Position	Term of office			Political party
No.	Portrait	Name (Birth–Death)	Position	Took office	Left office	Time in office	Political party
1		Torez Kulumbegov (1938–2006)	Chairman of the Supreme Soviet	10 October 1990	4 May 1991	206 days	Independent
2		Znaur Gassiyev (1925–2016)	Chairman of the Supreme Soviet	4 May 1991	9 September 1992	1 year, 128 days	Independent
3		Torez Kulumbegov (1938–2006)	Chairman of the State Nyhas	9 September 1992	17 September 1993	1 year, 8 days	Independent
4		Lyudvig Chibirov (born 1932)	Chairman of the State Nyhas (1993–1994)	17 September 1993	27 November 1996	3 years, 71 days	Independent
4		Lyudvig Chibirov (born 1932)	Chairman of the Supreme Soviet (1994–1996)	17 September 1993	27 November 1996	3 years, 71 days	Independent

=== List of presidents of South Ossetia ===
No.	Portrait	Name (Birth–Death)	Term of office			Political party	Election
No.	Portrait	Name (Birth–Death)	Took office	Left office	Time in office	Political party	Election
1	Lyudvig Chibirov	Lyudvig Chibirov (born 1932)	27 November 1996	18 December 2001	5 years, 21 days	Independent	1996
2	Eduard Kokoity	Eduard Kokoity (born 1964)	18 December 2001	10 December 2011 (Resigned)	9 years, 357 days	Unity Party	2001; 2006
–	Vadim Brovtsev	Vadim Brovtsev (1969–2024); Acting	11 December 2011	19 April 2012	130 days	Unity Party	–
3	Leonid Tibilov	Leonid Tibilov (born 1951)	19 April 2012	21 April 2017	5 years, 2 days	Independent	2012
4	Anatoly Bibilov	Anatoly Bibilov (born 1970)	21 April 2017	24 May 2022	5 years, 33 days	United Ossetia	2017
5	Alan Gagloyev	Alan Gagloyev (born 1981)	24 May 2022	23 June 2026 (Resigned)	4 years, 30 days	Nykhaz	2022
–	Marat Kambolov	Marat Kambolov (born 1965); Acting	23 June 2026	30 September 2026	99 days	Independent	–
6	Marat Kambolov	Marat Kambolov (born 1965)	30 September 2026	Incumbent	31 days	Independent	2026

== Office holders ==
=== Head ===
No.	Name	Portrait	Term start	Term end
1	Dmitry Sanakoyev		10 May 2007	4 November 2022
2	Tamaz Bestayev		4 November 2022	9 February 2026

== Latest election ==
Candidate	Party	Votes	%
Marat Kambolov	Independent	27,922	86.97
Murat Valiyev	Patriots of Alanya	1,257	3.92
Kazbek Kodoyev	Independent	828	2.58
Zurab Kokoyev	Unity Party	488	1.52
None of the above		1,610	5.01
Total		32,105	100.00
Valid votes		32,105	97.68
Invalid/blank votes		764	2.32
Total votes		32,869	100.00
Registered voters/turnout		39,768	82.65
Source: CIKRUO

== See also ==
- Government of South Ossetia
- Prime Minister of South Ossetia
- Minister of Foreign Affairs (South Ossetia)
