= United Ossetia =

United Ossetia Иугонд Ир Единая Осетия
- Leader: Alan Tadtaev
- Founded: 5 September 2012
- Merger of: Social Democrats (2014)
- Split from: Unity Party
- Succeeded by: For Justice (2024)
- Ideology: Russian conservatism; Ossetian nationalism; Russophilia
- Parliament: 7 / 34 (21%)

Website
- edinayaosetia.org

United Ossetia (Iron Ossetic: Иугонд Ир, Russian: Единая Осетия) is a political party in South Ossetia founded in 2012. In the 2014 parliamentary election it won 20 out of 34 seats, clearing the majority in the Parliament of South Ossetia, unseating the Unity Party from power. In the 2019 elections the party lost its majority, while it could not secure a majority with other parties, resulting in a 'hung parliament'. The party lost its status as the largest party in the 2024 election.

== Leadership ==
Between 2012 and 2017 the party was led by Anatoliy Bibilov, a former member of the Unity Party and losing contender in the 2011 presidential elections and current President of South Ossetia since his victory in the 2017 elections. When Bibilov took the presidential office, Alan Tadtaev became party chairman, and after the 2019 elections he was elected as speaker of the parliament.

== International relations ==
- Alliance of Independent Social Democrats: Cooperation agreement signed in 2018.
- United Russia: Cooperation agreement signed in 2022.

== History ==
=== 2019 election ===
The party had their congress to name candidates to the 2019 parliamentary election on March 31, 2019, with Alan Tadtayev being named the party's leader. The congress was largely dominated by a speech by Bibilov, who thanked the party for their support in the 2017 presidential election, and that his success gave the party credibility.

The party outlined its goals for the election as "ensuring the reliable security of our homeland, national unity, economic development, improving the well-being and well-being of citizens, generating innovative ideas and proposals." Noticeably absent from their platform was a call for Russia to annex South Ossetia, a call they campaigned on in 2014, and a significant softening of their Russian stance as, during the entire congress, the word "Russia" was never said by any of the speakers.

=== 2024 election ===
In 2024, citing Bibilov and the party's handling of the investigation and protests following the Murder of Inal Djabiev, five of the fourteen United Ossetia MPs left the party and founded a new splinter party For Justice led by Harry Muldarov.
