= Anatoly Bibilov =

President of South Ossetia from 2017 to 2022

- Бибылты Анатолий (Iron Ossetic); Анатолий Бибилов (Russian)
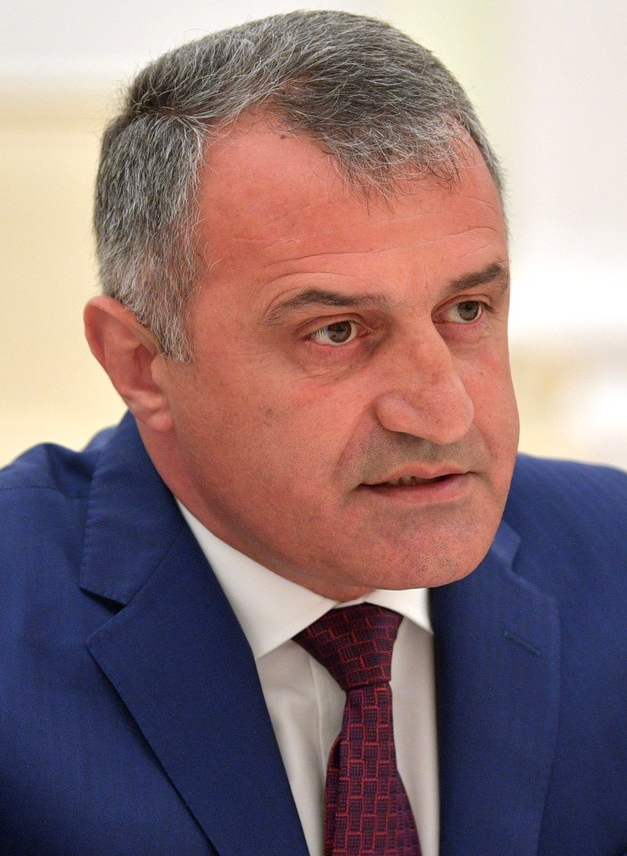
- Bibilov in 2018

4th President of South Ossetia
- In office 21 April 2017 – 24 May 2022
- Prime Minister: Domenty Kulumbegov; Erik Pukhayev; Gennady Bekoyev
- Preceded by: Leonid Tibilov
- Succeeded by: Alan Gagloev

Speaker of the Parliament
- In office 24 June 2014 – 21 April 2017
- Preceded by: Stanislav Kochiev
- Succeeded by: Inal Mamiev

Personal details
- Born: 13 January 1970 (age 56) Tskhinvali, South Ossetian Autonomous Oblast, Georgian SSR, USSR
- Party: United Ossetia
- Education: Ryazan Higher Airborne Command School

Military service
- Branch/service: Soviet Army; Armed Forces of South Ossetia; Russian Airborne Troops
- Years of service: USSR (1988—1991); Russia (1991—1994); South Ossetia (1994—1996); Russia (1998—2008)
- Rank: Lieutenant General

Anatoly Ilyich Bibilov (Note: Iron Ossetic: Бибылты Ильяйы фырт Анатолий, romanized: Bibylty Iljajy fyrt Anatolij; pronounced [ˈbibɘltɘ ilˈjajɘ fɘrt anaˈtolij]; Russian: Анатолий Ильич Бибилов, romanized: Anatolij Iljič Bibilov, pronounced [ənɐˈtolij ɪˈlʲjitɕ bʲɪˈbʲiləf]) (born 6 February 1970) is a South Ossetian military officer, was the fourth president of South Ossetia. He succeeded Leonid Tibilov as president on 21 April 2017 to 24 May 2022, following his election victory, but was defeated by Alan Gagloev in the 2022 election.

== Biography ==
Bibilov was born in the South Ossetian AO of the Georgian SSR in the Soviet Union. After eight grade he went to a boarding school in Tbilisi with intensive military and physical training, thereafter he joined the Ryazan Higher Airborne Command School. After graduating, Bibilov was distributed to the 76th Guards Air Assault Division. His division was included in the consolidated battalion of peacekeepers in South Ossetia. Subsequently he joined the South Ossetian Army, commanding a special forces unit. Between the period 1998-2008 he rejoined the peacekeeping forces, this time in a North Ossetia battalion. Bibilov took an active part in the Russo-Georgian War, organizing the defence of one of the districts of Tskhinvali against the Georgian Armed Forces.

== Politics ==
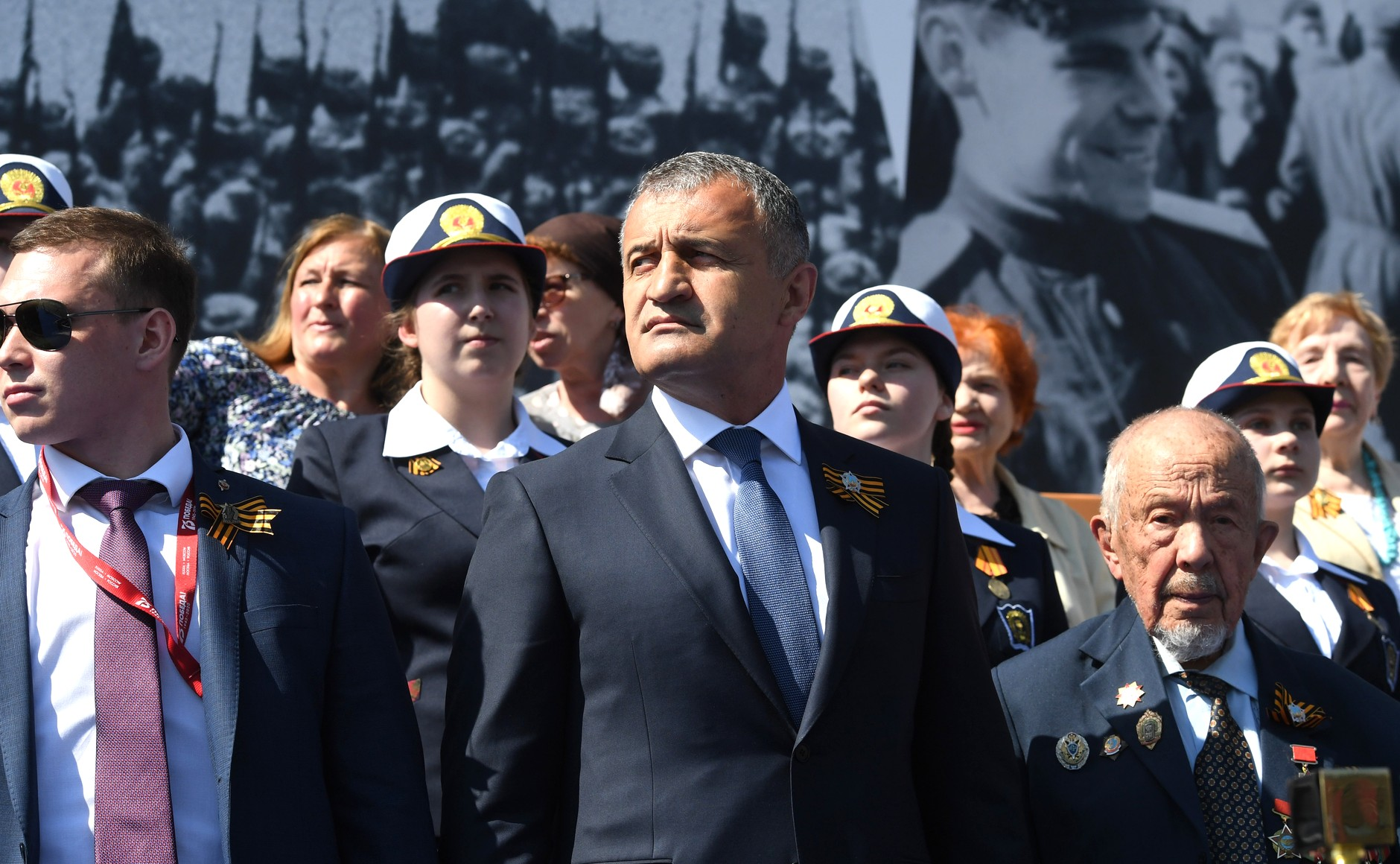
Bibilov at the 2020 Moscow Victory Day Parade on Red Square

In October 2008 he was appointed Minister of Emergency Situations of South Ossetia. Bibilov was the presidential candidate for the Unity Party in the South Ossetian presidential election, 2011. He won the first round, but lost the runoff to Alla Dzhioyeva.

Soon however, the parliament of South Ossetia declared the elections invalid. Leonid Tibilov was ultimately elected president after winning the South Ossetian presidential election, 2012, which Bibilov did not participate in. In June 2014 he was elected as the president of the parliament of South Ossetia. He is currently the head of the United Ossetia party, which nominated him for their candidate to the South Ossetian presidential election, 2017. Bibilov won the election in the first round by getting 54.8% of the vote and took office as the 4th president of South Ossetia on 21 April 2017. During his inauguration, delegations from the Nagorno-Karabakh Republic, the Donetsk and Lugansk People's Republics and Russia were present.

Bibilov supports South Ossetia joining Russia, and has called for a referendum on the issue.

One of the controversies of Bibilov's late tenure would be the Ministry of Construction's construction of a gym for the secondary school of Tsinagari. The School's director, former Member of Parliament Lasko Gussoev was able to bring the issue to national prominence stating that the Ministry of Construction built the gym, but did not install a transformer or other electoral components rendering the gym inoperable. It would take over 2 years of Gussoev's lobbying and significant media coverage before the gym was completed.

Bibilov was defeated by Alan Gagloyev in the 2022 election.

=== Cabinet ===
During his tenure as President, Bibilov's cabinet consisted of the following:

Position	Name
Minister of Culture	Zhanna Zasseeva
Minister of the Economy	Gennady Kokoev
Minister of Education	Natali Gasieva (2017-2021)
Minister of Emergency Situations	Alan Tadtaev
Minister of Finance	Aza Khabalova
Minister of Foreign Affairs	Dmitry Medoev
Minister of Justice	Zalina Lalieva

== Sanctions ==
In September 2015, he was included in the sanctions list of Ukraine. Bibilov was recognized as a person who creates "real and/or potential threats to national interests, national security, sovereignty and territorial integrity of Ukraine." Bibilov probably fell under this definition because of repeated visits to the unrecognized DPR and LPR, as well as to Crimea.

== Awards ==
- Uatsamonga Order (2008, South Ossetia)
- Order of Friendship (1 September 2011, Russia)
- Order of the Umayyads 1st Class (2018, Syria)

== Personal life ==
He is married with four children.

== Notes ==
Political offices
Preceded by Leonid Tibilov	President of South Ossetia; 2017–2022	Succeeded by Alan Gagloyev
