= Parliament of South Ossetia =

Legislature of South Ossetia

Parliament of South Ossetia Парламент Южной Осетии Хуссар Ирыстоны Парламент
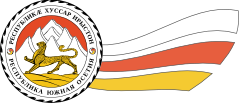

Type
- Type: Parliament

History
- Founded: 2 November 1993

Leadership
- President: Alan Margiev, Nykhas since 24 June 2024
- First vice-speaker: Zita Besayeva, Nykhas

Structure
- Seats: 34
- Political groups: Government (15): Nykhas (10); People's Party (5); Supported by (6): Communist Party (3); Independents (3); Opposition (13): United Ossetia (7); Independents (6)

Elections
- Voting system: Parallel voting: 17 seats are elected by Party-list proportional representation; 17 seats are elected by Single-member district
- First election: March 1994
- Last election: 9 June 2024

Meeting place
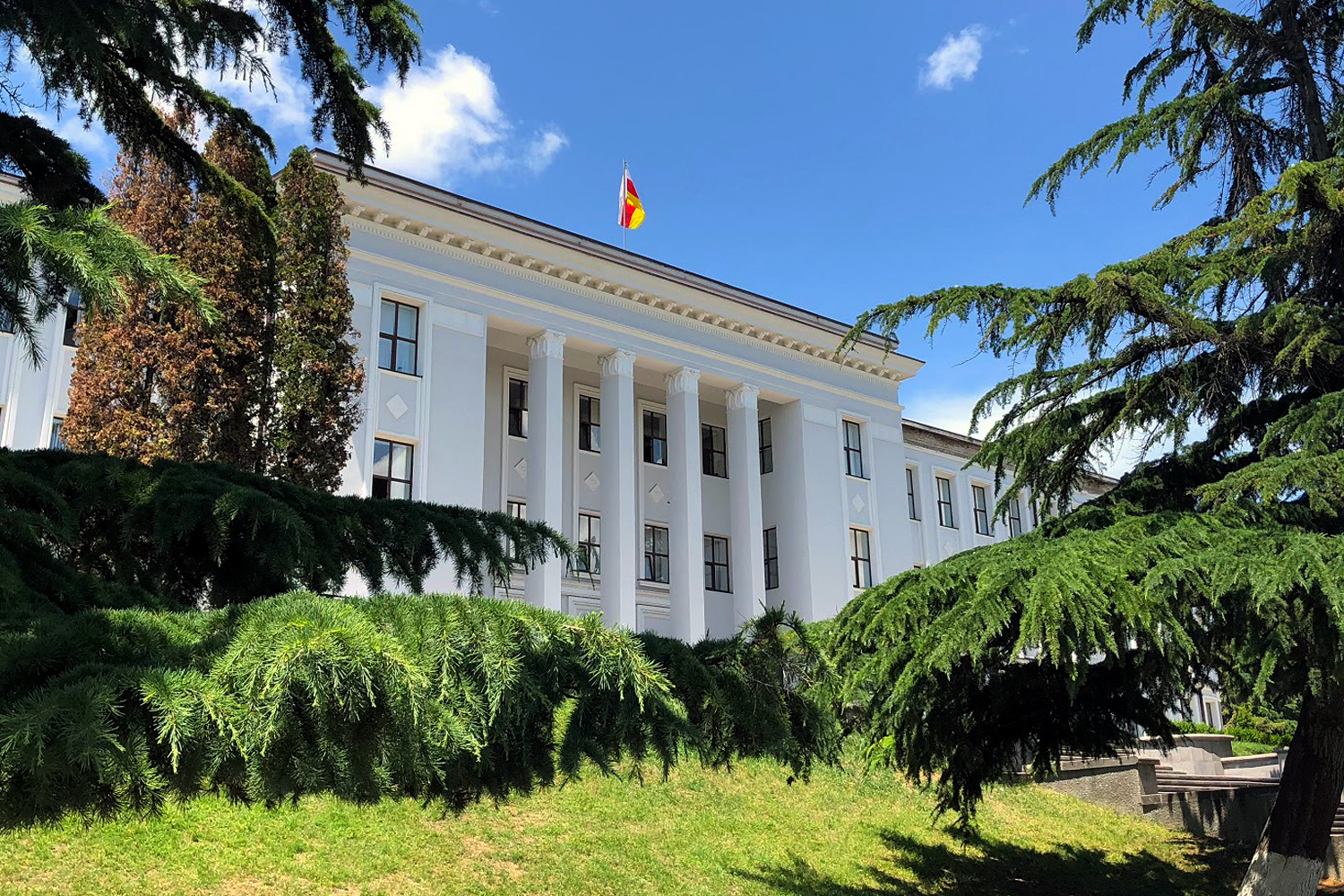
- Tskhinvali

Website
- www.parliamentrso.org

The Parliament of South Ossetia is the unicameral legislature of the partially recognized Republic of South Ossetia. The 34 members of parliament are elected using a mixed system of Party-list proportional representation (17) and Single-member district (17). South Ossetia has a multi-party system, and currently 5 political parties are represented in parliament and has 6 independent MPs elected through single-member districts. The parliament is headed by a speaker, who is elected from among the members. Since 15 September 2022, the speaker of parliament is Alan Alborov, one of the four deputees of the Nykhaz party of president Alan Gagloev, after Alan Tadtaev of United Ossetia was forced to resign.

== History ==
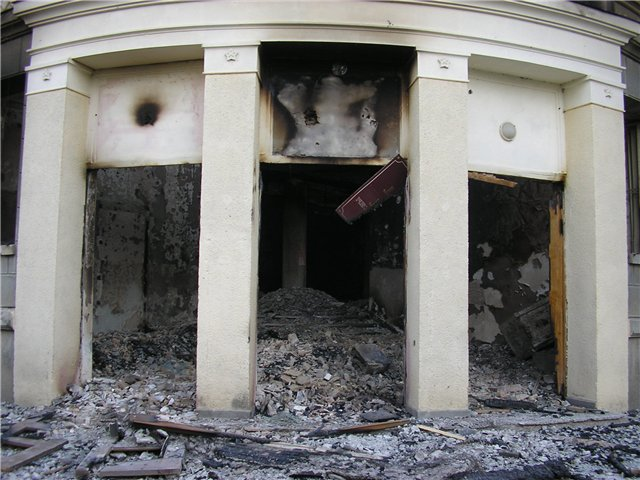
Damage to the Parliament building in August 2008

The parliament of South Ossetia meets in the capital Tskhinvali. The parliament building was built in 1937 as the Soviet of the South Ossetian Autonomous Oblast.

On 10 November 1989, the Soviet of the South Ossetian AO requested the Soviet Union elevate the AO to an Autonomous Soviet Socialist Republics. This resulted in the "War of Laws", a period of intense legal debates between officials from the South Ossetian AO the Georgian SSR, and the USSR which would turn into open warfare between Georgian and Ossetian militias and the Soviet Army near the end of 1990.

During the Russo-Georgian war of 2008 the building, and its neighboring administrative complex, was shelled by artillery by the Georgian Army. After initially denying that they targeted the building, Georgian chief of staff, Zaza Gogava, issued a statement that the parliament building, and its nearby offices, were holding the headquarters of various South Ossetian militias, and that the artillery hit no civilian targets. Human Rights Watch and the Red Cross both noted the incident as a potential violation of article 8 of the Rome Statute, however, if there were South Ossetian militants in the building, it would not be a war crime.

Following the war, Parliament and the area around it, including Tskhinvali's Jewish quarter, were largely demolished and rebuilt as a new model city by Russian officials.

== Latest election ==
Since 2020, three opposition parties, Nykhaz, the People's Party and Unity of the People entered a coalition. After the 2022 South Ossetian presidential election saw Nykhaz's Alan Gagloev win the Presidency, this opposition coalition becoming the governing minority government. This resulted in gridlock and a hung parliament due to United Ossetia's opposition to the government.

Following the 2024 election, Nykhaz won 10 direct seats and the support of 3 independents while their coalition with the People's Party was preserved and with the Communist Party also announced their support of the government, bringing the coalition to an outright majority of 21.
