= Elections in South Ossetia =

Despite being unrecognized as a state by the vast majority of countries, South Ossetia has elected on the national level a head of state—a president—and a legislature since its breakaway from Georgia. According to Article 47 of the Constitution of South Ossetia, the president is the head of state and head of the executive branch of government, elected for five years by direct popular vote, with a maximum of two consecutive terms for the same person. South Ossetia's legislative body, the unicameral parliament, consists of 34 members who are elected by popular vote for five years in a mixed system of 17 single-member constituencies and 17 delegates elected through proportional representation (article 57).

== Elections ==
=== Presidential ===
==== 1996 ====
Lyudvig Chibirov became the first president of South Ossetia.

| Candidate | Votes | % |
|---|---|---|
| Lyudvig Chibirov | | 52.3 |
| Gerasim Khugayev | | 23.9 |
| Three other candidates | | 23.8 |
| Total | | |
| Registered voters/turnout | | 61.3 |
Source: Ian Jeffries (2003) The Caucasus and Central Asian Republics at the Turn of the Twenty-First Century: A Guide to the Economies in Transition, Routledge

==== 2001 ====
Eduard Kokoity was elected.

==== 2006 ====
Kokoity was reelected to his second term.

| Candidate | Votes | % |
|---|---|---|
| Eduard Kokoity | 51,150 | 98.06 |
| Leonid Tibilov | 476 | 0.91 |
| Inal Pukhayev | 194 | 0.37 |
| Oleg Gabodze | 175 | 0.34 |
| Against all | 168 | 0.32 |
| Total | 52,163 | 100.00 |
| Valid votes | 52,163 | 99.47 |
| Invalid/blank votes | 280 | 0.53 |
| Total votes | 52,443 | 100.00 |
| Registered voters/turnout | 55,163 | 95.07 |
Source: Cominf

==== 2011 ====
Eduard Kokoity was barred from running again, as he had served two terms. There was a runoff, as no candidate received a majority of the votes, in which Alla Dzhioyeva claimed to have defeated Anatoly Bibilov. However, the Unity Party filed a complaint with the Supreme Court of South Ossetia, alleging Dzhioyeva's campaign had used illegal means to secure the victory, and the Supreme Court declared the election invalid. A new election date was agreed upon for 25 March 2012.

| Candidate | Party | First round | | Second round | |
| Candidate | Party | Votes | % | Votes | % |
|---|---|---|---|---|---|
| Anatoly Bibilov | Unity Party | 6,066 | 24.86 | 10,462 | 40.88 |
| Alla Dzhioyeva | Independent | 6,052 | 24.80 | 14,828 | 57.95 |
| Vadim Chovrebov | | 2,418 | 9.91 | | |
| Alan Kotaev | | 2,358 | 9.66 | | |
| Dmitriy Tasoev | Social Democratic Party | 2,318 | 9.50 | | |
| Georgiy Kabisov | Independent | 1,859 | 7.62 | | |
| Vladimir Kelekhsaev | Unity of the People | 1,623 | 6.65 | | |
| Sergej Bitiev | | 815 | 3.34 | | |
| Soslan Tedety | | 275 | 1.13 | | |
| Alan Pliev | | 255 | 1.04 | | |
| Dzhemal Dzhigkaev | | 231 | 0.95 | | |
| Against all | | 134 | 0.55 | 299 | 1.17 |
| Total | | 24,404 | 100.00 | 25,589 | 100.00 |
Source: Cominf, Kavkaz Uzel (second round 87% counted)

==== 2012 ====
There were four new candidates for the 2012 election, as none of the 2011 candidates registered. Dzhioyeva was hospitalized for "hypertension," allegedly having been beaten and held against her will.

| Candidate | Party | First round | | Second round | |
| Candidate | Party | Votes | % | Votes | % |
|---|---|---|---|---|---|
| Leonid Tibilov | Independent | 11,453 | 43.83 | 15,786 | 55.38 |
| David Sanakoyev | Independent | 6,627 | 25.36 | 12,439 | 43.64 |
| Dmitry Medoyev | Independent | 6,415 | 24.55 | | |
| Stanislav Kochiyev | Communist Party of South Ossetia | 1,417 | 5.42 | | |
| Against all | | 216 | 0.83 | 279 | 0.98 |
| Total | | 26,128 | 100.00 | 28,504 | 100.00 |
Source: RES, CIK

==== 2017 ====
Anatoly Bibilov won the election in the first round.

| Candidate | Party | Votes | % |
|---|---|---|---|
| Anatoly Bibilov | United Ossetia | 17,736 | 54.80 |
| Leonid Tibilov | Independent | 10,909 | 33.71 |
| Alan Gagloev | Independent | 3,291 | 10.17 |
| Against all | | 429 | 1.33 |
| Total | | 32,365 | 100.00 |
| Valid votes | | 32,365 | 95.72 |
| Invalid/blank votes | | 1,447 | 4.28 |
| Total votes | | 33,812 | 100.00 |
| Registered voters/turnout | | 42,459 | 79.63 |
Source: South Osetia

==== 2022 ====
Alan Gagloev won the election, but unexpectedly resigned in June 2026 to become an advisor to Russian president Vladimir Putin.

| Candidate | Party | First round | | Second round | |
| Candidate | Party | Votes | % | Votes | % |
|---|---|---|---|---|---|
| Alan Gagloev | Nykhaz | 10,707 | 38.55 | 16,134 | 56.08 |
| Anatoly Bibilov | United Ossetia | 9,706 | 34.95 | 11,767 | 40.90 |
| Aleksandr Pliyev | People's Party of South Ossetia | 3,434 | 12.37 | | |
| Garry Muldarov | Independent | 2,592 | 9.33 | | |
| Dmitry Tasoyev | Independent | 822 | 2.96 | | |
| None of the above | | 510 | 1.84 | 867 | 3.01 |
| Total | | 27,771 | 100.00 | 28,768 | 100.00 |
| Valid votes | | 27,771 | 95.57 | 28,768 | 97.77 |
| Invalid/blank votes | | 1,286 | 4.43 | 655 | 2.23 |
| Total votes | | 29,057 | 100.00 | 29,423 | 100.00 |
| Registered voters/turnout | | 39,282 | 73.97 | 39,798 | 73.93 |
Source: CIKRUO, CIKRUO

==== 2026 ====
Marat Kambolov was elected following the resignation of his predecessor.

| Candidate | Party | Votes | % |
|---|---|---|---|
| Marat Kambolov | Independent | 27,922 | 86.97 |
| Murat Valiyev | Patriots of Alanya | 1,257 | 3.92 |
| Kazbek Kodoyev | Independent | 828 | 2.58 |
| Zurab Kokoyev | Unity Party | 488 | 1.52 |
| None of the above | | 1,610 | 5.01 |
| Total | | 32,105 | 100.00 |
| Valid votes | | 32,105 | 97.68 |
| Invalid/blank votes | | 764 | 2.32 |
| Total votes | | 32,869 | 100.00 |
| Registered voters/turnout | | 39,768 | 82.65 |
Source: CIKRUO

=== Parliamentary ===
==== 1994 ====
| Party | Votes | % | Seats |
|---|---|---|---|
| Communist Party of South Ossetia | | 47.2 | 19 |
| Independents | | 52.8 | 17 |
| Total | | | 36 |

==== 1999 ====
| Party | Votes | % | Seats |
|---|---|---|---|
| Communist Party of South Ossetia | | ~80% | 27 |
| Independents | | ~20% | 2 |
| Vacant | | | 4 |
| Total | | | 33 |
Source: RFERL

==== 2004 ====
| Party | Votes | % | Seats | | |
| Party | Votes | % | PR | FPTP | Total |
|---|---|---|---|---|---|
| Unity Party | | 54.6 | 9 | 11 | 20 |
| Communist Party of South Ossetia | | 27.4 | 4 | ? | ? |
| People's Party of South Ossetia | | 11.4 | 2 | ? | ? |
| Independents | | 6.4 | 0 | ? | ? |
| Against all | | 2.9 | – | – | – |
| Vacant | | | 0 | 0 | 4 |
| Total | | | 15 | 15 | 34 |
Source: , ,

==== 2009 ====
| Party | Votes | % | Seats |
|---|---|---|---|
| Unity Party | 21,246 | 47.53 | 17 |
| People's Party of South Ossetia | 10,345 | 23.14 | 9 |
| Communist Party of South Ossetia | 10,194 | 22.80 | 8 |
| Fatherland Socialist Party | 2,918 | 6.53 | 0 |
| Total | 44,703 | 100.00 | 34 |
| Valid votes | 44,703 | 97.58 | |
| Invalid/blank votes | 1,110 | 2.42 | |
| Total votes | 45,813 | 100.00 | |
| Registered voters/turnout | 55,980 | 81.84 | |
Source: Cominf

==== 2014 ====
| Party | Votes | % | Seats | +/– |
|---|---|---|---|---|
| United Ossetia | 9,083 | 44.97 | 20 | New |
| Unity of the People | 2,790 | 13.81 | 6 | New |
| People's Party of South Ossetia | 1,915 | 9.48 | 4 | –5 |
| Nykhaz | 1,574 | 7.79 | 4 | New |
| New Ossetia | 1,267 | 6.27 | 0 | New |
| Unity Party | 1,219 | 6.04 | 0 | –17 |
| Communist Party of South Ossetia | 890 | 4.41 | 0 | –8 |
| Homeland | 802 | 3.97 | 0 | New |
| Fatherland Socialist Party | 658 | 3.26 | 0 | 0 |
| Total | 20,198 | 100.00 | 34 | 0 |
| Valid votes | 20,198 | 95.85 | | |
| Invalid/blank votes | 874 | 4.15 | | |
| Total votes | 21,072 | 100.00 | | |
| Registered voters/turnout | 35,133 | 59.98 | | |
Source: Cominf

==== 2019 ====
| Party | Proportional | | | District | | | Total seats | +/– |
| Party | Votes | % | Seats | Votes | % | Seats | Total seats | +/– |
|---|---|---|---|---|---|---|---|---|
| United Ossetia | 7,778 | 34.96 | 7 | 4,713 | 24.17 | 7 | 14 | –6 |
| People's Party of South Ossetia | 4,849 | 21.79 | 4 | 1,776 | 9.11 | 1 | 5 | +1 |
| Nykhaz | 3,198 | 14.37 | 3 | 1,211 | 6.21 | 1 | 4 | 0 |
| Unity of the People | 2,883 | 12.96 | 2 | 2,139 | 10.97 | 1 | 3 | –3 |
| Communist Party of South Ossetia | 1,622 | 7.29 | 1 | 1,263 | 6.48 | 1 | 2 | +2 |
| Fatherland Socialist Party | 710 | 3.19 | 0 | 7 | 0.04 | 0 | 0 | 0 |
| Unity Party | 630 | 2.83 | 0 | | | 0 | 0 | 0 |
| Homeland | | | | 272 | 1.40 | 0 | 0 | 0 |
| Independents | | | | 6,993 | 35.87 | 6 | 6 | +6 |
| Against all | 579 | 2.60 | – | 1,123 | 5.76 | – | – | – |
| Total | 22,249 | 100.00 | 17 | 19,497 | 100.00 | 17 | 34 | 0 |
| Valid votes | 22,249 | 95.28 | | 19,497 | 94.94 | | | |
| Invalid/blank votes | 1,102 | 4.72 | | 1,040 | 5.06 | | | |
| Total votes | 23,351 | 100.00 | | 20,537 | 100.00 | | | |
| Registered voters/turnout | 35,254 | 66.24 | | 33,954 | 60.48 | | | |
Source: CIKRUO, Respublika

==== 2024 ====
| Party | Proportional | | | District | | | Total seats |
| Party | Votes | % | Seats | Votes | % | Seats | Total seats |
|---|---|---|---|---|---|---|---|
| United Ossetia | 6,942 | 31.75 | 6 | 2,660 | 13.70 | 1 | 7 |
| Nykhaz | 6,690 | 30.59 | 6 | 2,852 | 14.69 | 4 | 10 |
| People's Party of South Ossetia | 3,514 | 16.07 | 3 | 2,345 | 12.08 | 2 | 5 |
| Communist Party of South Ossetia | 1,557 | 7.12 | 2 | 621 | 3.20 | 1 | 3 |
| Ira Farn | 1,038 | 4.75 | 0 | 195 | 1.00 | 0 | 0 |
| Unity of the People (South Ossetia) | 918 | 4.20 | 0 | 961 | 4.95 | 0 | 0 |
| Unity Party (South Ossetia) | 409 | 1.87 | 0 | 0 | 0.00 | 0 | 0 |
| Fatherland Socialist Party | 0 | 0.00 | 0 | 134 | 0.69 | 0 | 0 |
| Independent | 0 | 0.00 | 0 | 8,646 | 44.54 | 9 | 9 |
| Against all | 800 | 3.66 | 0 | 999 | 5.15 | 0 | 0 |
| Total | 21,868 | 100.00 | 17 | 19,413 | 100.00 | 17 | 34 |

== See also ==
- Electoral calendar
- Electoral system
- Elections in Georgia
