= 2011 South Ossetia election protests =

The 2011 South Ossetia election protests, also known as the Snow Revolution (Iron Ossetic: Ихы революци, romanized: Ihy revolûci), were mass protests in the partially recognized country of the Republic of South Ossetia in 2011. Protests were held due to rejection of the Supreme Court's decision to cancel the results of the presidential elections in which Alla Dzhioyeva won. Her supporters demanded the resignation of the government and the admission of Dzhioyeva to the next elections. The result was the resignation of President Eduard Kokoity and re-elections in 2012.

== Background ==
Dzhioeva was fired from her post as education minister in 2008 on charges of fraud. The criminal prosecution continued until 2010, when the Supreme Court found her guilty and fined her 120,000 rubles... She appealed and claimed that the criminal case was politically motivated.

The Central Election Commission of the Republic of South Ossetia officially refused to register the candidacy of Dzhambolat Tedeyev, citing the residency requirement, according to which a presidential candidate must have permanently resided in the Republic for the past 10 years. After this, Tedeyev's supporters tried to influence the Central Election Commission of the Republic by force. They attempted to storm the building. A crowd of about 150 people tried to break into the parliament building, where the Central Election Commission is also located, demanding that Tedeyev be immediately registered as a presidential candidate. The people who entered the building were forced out onto the street by security and riot police. The building's security opened fire in the air. The authorities considered the incident an attempt to seize the Central Election Commission. Arrests began. Tedeev, who was accused of organizing the riots, went to his father's house in the center of Tskhinvali, and several dozen local residents sympathizing with him surrounded the house to prevent riot police from entering if the authorities decided to storm it. Famous athletes went from Russia to Ossetia to support Tedeyev. They were not allowed in, after which border traffic with the Russian Federation was completely stopped (it will be restored on October 3). The Minister of Sports, Tourism and Youth Policy of the Russian Federation Vitaly Mutko expressed concern about the current situation and said that the Ministry would send people to Ossetia so that the head of the Russian national freestyle wrestling team could arrive safely in the capital. Tedeyev himself welcomed the fact that the Russian Government had decided to stand up for him.

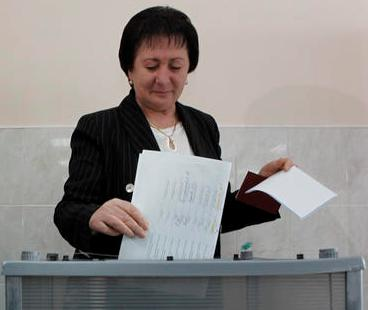
Candidate Alla Dzhioyeva at the ballot box on election day

After this, he refused to participate in the elections and instead supported the opposition candidacy of Alla Dzhioyeva.

Based on the results of the first round, the candidates from the current president, Anatoly Bibilov (24.86%) and Alla Dzhioeva (24.80%), advanced to the second round. In the second round, Alla won with 57.95%. But the Unity Party had no intention of handing over power to a non-government candidate and was determined to remove Alla’s candidacy at any cost. The party nomenklatura, claiming that Dzhioeva's campaign had used illegal methods to secure victory, filed a complaint with the Supreme Court seeking to hand the victory to their candidate. The court subsequently declared the election invalid. Re-elections were called. But this did not please her supporters, who recognized her as a legally elected president and considered the holding of new elections to be lawless. This illegal court decision became the reason for the protests.

== Chronology ==
- November 27, 2011 — the second round of elections for the post of President of South Ossetia.
- November 28, 2011 — the Chairman of the Supreme Court Atsamaz Bichenov reported that the Supreme Court prohibited the Central Election Commission from announcing the results of the vote, having received a complaint from Bilibov’s Unity party about the actions of Dzhioeva’s supporters. The Central Election Commission announced the preliminary results of the vote, according to which Dzhioeva received more than 56% of the votes.
- November 29, 2011 — the Chairman of the Supreme Court Atsamaz Bichenov reported that the Supreme Court of South Ossetia had decided to declare the elections held on November 27 invalid.
- November 30, 2011 — Dzhioeva declared herself the elected president and formed the State Council.
- December 1, 2011 — a tent camp was set up near the Government House.
- December 3, 2011 — the opposition demanded the resignation of Eduard Kokoity; Dzhioeva’s inauguration ceremony is scheduled for December 10.
- December 6, 2011 — the Supreme Court considered Dzhioeva’s appeal against the decision of November 29 and left it unsatisfied.
- December 9, 2011 — Kokoity and Dzhioeva sign an agreement on the protesters leaving the square in Tskhinvali, Kokoity's resignation, holding elections on March 25 and Dzhioeva's right to participate in them, the temporary performance of the duties of the president by Prime Minister Brovtsev, and a presentation to parliament on the resignation of the Prosecutor General and the Chairman of the Supreme Court
  - The parliament did not support the dismissal of the Prosecutor General and the Chairman of the Supreme Court of the republic, threatening to disrupt the agreement reached with the mediation of the Russian representative.
  - Dzhioeva said that in such a case she could withdraw her signature from the agreement. After this, her offices were searched and she herself was hospitalized after being hit with a rifle butt
- December 10, 2011 — Eduard Kokoity resigned. Until the repeat elections scheduled for March 25, 2012, the Prime Minister of South Ossetia Vadim Brovtsev became acting president. On the very first day of his rule, he accused Alla Dzhioeva of the fact that the attempt to proclaim herself president against the will of the court was an attempt at a coup d'etat.
- March 24, 2012 — Dzhioeva leaves the hospital
- March 22, 2012 - 8 April 2012 — Two rounds of re-elections take place without incident
- May 23, 2012 — Dzhioyeva was appointed Deputy Prime Minister by decree of new President Leonid Tibilov
