= 2017 in South Ossetia =

- Decades: 1990s; 2000s; 2010s; 2020s
- See also: Other events of 2017; Timeline of South Ossetian history

Events in the year 2017 in South Ossetia.

== Incumbents ==
- President: Leonid Tibilov (until 21 April); Anatoliy Bibilov (from 21 April)
- Prime Minister: Domenty Kulumbegov

== Events ==
- 9 April – South Ossetian presidential election, 2017, won by Anatoliy Bibilov.
- 9 April – Following a name change referendum, the constitution was amended to denominate the formal name of the country from "Republic of South Ossetia" to "Republic of South Ossetia–the State of Alania" ("South Ossetia–Alania" for short).
