= Znaur Gassiyev =

South Ossetian independence activist and politician; first head of state of South Ossetia

- Знаур Гассиев; Гасситы Знауыр
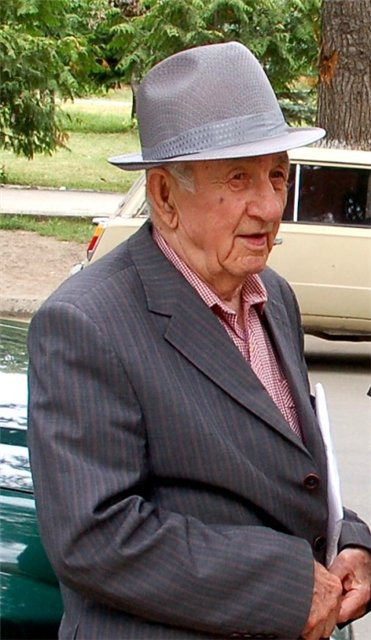
- Gassiyev in 2009

2nd Head of State of South Ossetia
- In office 1991–1992
- Preceded by: Torez Kulumbegov
- Succeeded by: Torez Kulumbegov

Chairman of Parliament for South Ossetia
- In office 2004–2009
- Preceded by: Stanislav Kochiev
- Succeeded by: Stanislav Kochiev

Personal details
- Born: 17 March 1925 Tskhinvali, South Ossetian Autonomous Oblast, Georgian SSR, Soviet Union
- Died: 6 March 2016 (aged 90)
- Party: Unity Party

Znaur Nikolayevich Gassiyev (Iron Ossetic: Гасситы Никъалайы фырт Знауыр / Gaššite Nikhalaye fert Znawer, Georgian: ზნაურ გასიევი, Russian: Знаур Николаевич Гассиев; 17 March 1925 – 6 March 2016) was a South Ossetian politician, who was one of the leaders of the South Ossetian independence movement in the early 1990s, which culminated in the 1991–1992 South Ossetia War.

== Early life ==
Gassiyev was born in Tskhinvali in 1925, but soon moved with his parents to Moscow. In 1935 the family went back to Tskhinvali, where Gassiyev finished secondary school in 1942. He enrolled in the physics and mathematics faculty of the South Ossetian State Pedagogical Institute, but was drafted into the Soviet Army to fight in World War II during the period 1942 to 1944. Upon completion of his studies in 1947, he started teaching mathematics and physics in various schools in Tskhinvali.

== Early political career ==
In 1951, Gassiyev moved to Tbilisi, where he worked as a teacher for four years, and at the same time studied at the Mining Department of the V. I. Lenin Georgian Polytechnical Institute, where he graduated with honours in 1955. He then started working at the Mining Department of Kvaisa, where he held several ranks.

== Political career ==
Gassiyev subsequently moved into politics, first working as the head of the industrial and transport committee of Dzau district. In the early 1960s, he was appointed the chairman of the Tskhinvali branch of the Georgian Communist Party, as well as the head of the administration of Tskhinvali city. In 1963, he went to the Higher Party School, from which he graduated with honours in 1965. Then, until 1972, he worked as deputy chairman of the South Ossetian executive committee.

In 1991, when armed aggression was starting, he was elected first secretary of the South Ossetian Communist Party, and also headed the Supreme Council when South Ossetia declared its independence. As chairman of parliament, Gassiyev was Head of State of South Ossetia. In early 1992, Gassiyev handed over power to Torez Kulumbegov, a former chairman of the Supreme Council, who had been imprisoned in Tbilisi by Georgian police until then.

Since 1992, Gassiyev remained active in politics, being re-elected as an MP in the 1994 election. Gassiyev was once again elected in the 2004 election, where he ran as a member of President Eduard Kokoity's Unity Party. Following the Unity Party's electoral victory, Gassiyev was once again elected chairman of Parliament.

=== Later career ===
After the 2008 South Ossetia war, Gassiyev was appointed head of the government's commission to deal with the resulting emergencies.

Gassiyev, then 84 years old, did not run in the 2009 election, and was replaced as speaker by Stanislav Kochiev.

On 27 October 2010, Gassiyev was appointed state advisor to President Eduard Kokoity. His death was announced on 6 March 2016.

Political offices
New office	Head of State of South Ossetia; 1991–1992	Succeeded by Torez Kulumbegov
Unknown Last known title holder: Torez Kulumbegov	Chairman of the Supreme Council; 1991–1992	Succeeded by Torez Kulumbegov
Preceded by Stanislav Kochiev	Chairman of Parliament; 2004–2009	Succeeded by Stanislav Kochiev
Notes and references
1. http://www.worldstatesmen.org/Georgia.html World Statesmen: Georgia
