= 2004 South Ossetian parliamentary election =

| ← 1999 | 23 May 2004 | 2009 → |
- 34 seats in the Parliament; 18 seats needed for a majority
| Prime Minister before | Prime Minister after |
|---|---|
| Igor Sanakoyev; Unity Party | Igor Sanakoyev; Unity Party |

Parliamentary elections were held in South Ossetia on 23 May 2004.

== Electoral system ==
At the time of the election, South Ossetia's parliament had 34 seats, an increase from 33 in 1999. Of these, 15 were elected by party-list proportional representation, 15 were elected by single-member district plurality voting, and four were designated for the Georgian minority who consistently boycotted elections. This election was the last time this system was used, as in the 2009 election, all 34 seats were filled using party-list proportional representation.

== Results ==
As of 13:00 local time, 52% of registered voters had cast their votes, crossing the electoral threshold of 50% plus one vote. The South Ossetian election commission has thus declared the elections valid.

The election was won by President of South Ossetia Eduard Kokoity's Unity Party, which got 9 of the 15 party-list seats (54.6% of all votes), as well as another 11 constituency seats, giving the party a controlling 20-seat majority. Znaur Gassiyev of the Unity Party was elected speaker, replacing Stanislav Kochiev of the Communist Party of South Ossetia. Gassiyev was one of the leaders of the Republic of South Ossetia in its forming days in the early 1990s, and acted as Head of State in 1991.

| Party | Votes | % | Seats | | |
| Party | Votes | % | PR | FPTP | Total |
|---|---|---|---|---|---|
| Unity Party | | 54.6 | 9 | 11 | 20 |
| Communist Party of South Ossetia | | 27.4 | 4 | ? | ? |
| People's Party of South Ossetia | | 11.4 | 2 | ? | ? |
| Independents | | 6.4 | 0 | ? | ? |
| Against all | | 2.9 | – | – | – |
| Vacant | | | 0 | 0 | 4 |
| Total | | | 15 | 15 | 34 |
Source: , ,
