= 2011 South Ossetian presidential election =

- 13 November 2011 (first round); 27 November 2011 (second round)
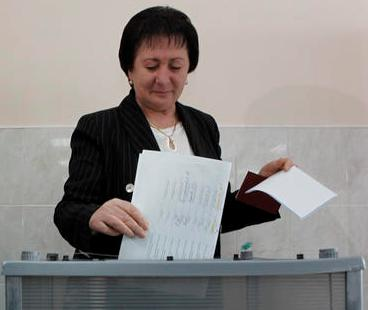

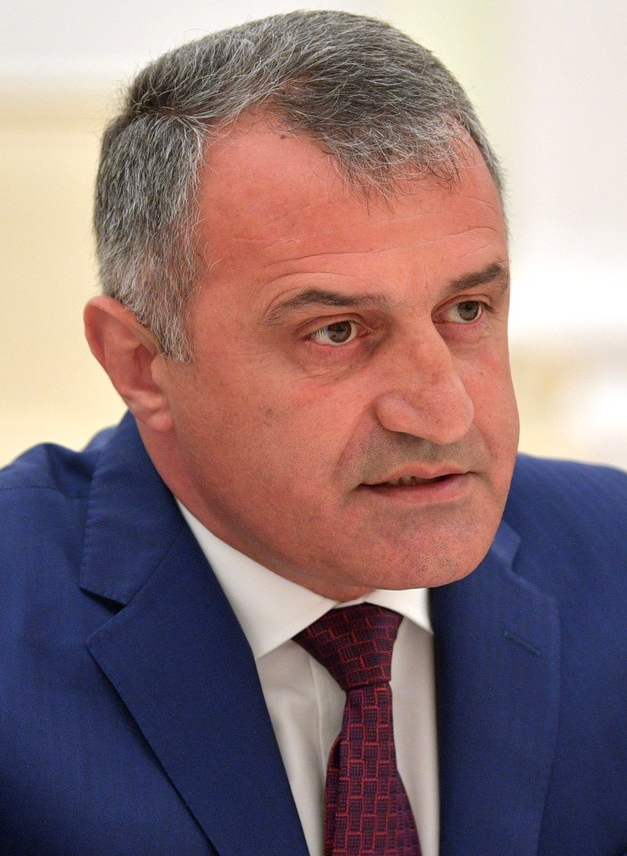
Nominee	Alla Dzhioyeva	Anatoliy Bibilov
Party	Independent	Unity Party
Popular vote	14,828	10,462
Percentage	57.95%	40.88%
President before election
Eduard Kokoity
Unity Party
Elected President
Election results annulled
Vadim Brovtsev becomes acting president

Presidential elections were held in South Ossetia on 13 November 2011. A referendum was held on the same day. A run-off was held on 27 November, but the result were invalidated by the Supreme Court of South Ossetia, leading to protests. A new election was scheduled for 25 March 2012.

== Candidates ==
Incumbent president Eduard Kokoity was constitutionally barred from serving a third term in office. Attempts were made to call a referendum to change the constitution, but this was blocked by the Supreme Court. Another attempt to change the constitution by a two-thirds majority in parliament was blocked by parliamentary chairman and Communist Party of South Ossetia leader Stanislav Kochiev.

Kokoity himself stated he had no intention in seeking a third term, and called on everybody to refrain from initiatives to allow him to serve a third term. Kokoity made it clear that he would not disappear from the South Ossetian political scene.

In the end, 17 candidates were registered by the electoral commission, including former prime minister Merab Chigoev, former education minister Alla Dzhioyeva, former Minister of Information, Communication and Mass Media Georgiy Kabisov, and incumbent Emergencies Minister Anatoly Bibilov. Days before the election, candidate Ivar Bestaev withdrew from the election, his name was not included on the ballots. This left 16 candidates, but in the following days five more candidates withdrew, including Chigoev.

Anatoly Bibilov claimed to be backed by Russia. A letter in his support from Vladimir Putin was read in an election meeting, and several United Russia members of parliament visited the republic and expressed their support for Bibilov, the ruling Unity party's candidate. Alla Dzhioyeva received support from Dzambolat Tedeev, the Russian freestyle wrestling team's coach, who was on 13 October expelled from South Ossetia on 14 October after being denied registration, and Anatoly Barankevich, former minister of defence of South Ossetia, who both opposed incumbent president Eduard Kokoity, a former member of the Soviet Union's national wrestling team. Dzhioyeva campaigned on the deficit of fuel, lack of cellular network in parts of the republic and misappropriated funds provided for the post-war reconstruction of South Ossetia by Russia.

== Election day ==
Polling stations were open from 8:00 until 20:00. There were 86 such stations, located all over the country, as well as in Moscow and Sukhumi. Special polling stations were opened for South Ossetian citizens living in North Ossetia–Alania. In South Ossetia, a turnout of 50% + 1 vote is required for an election to be valid. This threshold was reached around 16:00.

== Results ==
The two most successful participants were Bibilov, with 25.9% of votes cast, and Dzhioyeva, with a 24.8% share of the vote. They went through to a runoff on 27 November, which was needed as no candidate had achieved a majority in the first round.

Preliminary results for the second round released on 27 November show Dzhioyeva in the lead, with 8,955 votes to Bibilov's 6,205. With 87% of the vote processed, Dzhioyeva had 14,828 votes to 10,462 for Bibilov. Dzhioyeva claimed to have the final results showing she had won with 16,454 votes. However, the Unity Party filed a complaint at the Supreme Court of South Ossetia, alleging Dzhioyeva's campaign used illegal means to secure the victory. The Supreme Court subsequently declared the election invalid. A new election date was agreed upon for 25 March 2012. The Central Election Commission subsequently announced that the final results of the second round would not be released.

Candidate	Party	First round		Second round	
Candidate	Party	Votes	%	Votes	%
Anatoliy Bibilov	Unity Party	6,066	24.86	10,462	40.88
Alla Dzhioyeva	Independent	6,052	24.80	14,828	57.95
Vadim Chovrebov		2,418	9.91		
Alan Kotaev		2,358	9.66		
Dmitriy Tasoev	Social Democratic Party	2,318	9.50		
Georgiy Kabisov	Independent	1,859	7.62		
Vladimir Kelekhsaev	Unity of the People	1,623	6.65		
Sergej Bitiev		815	3.34		
Soslan Tedety		275	1.13		
Alan Pliev		255	1.04		
Dzhemal Dzhigkaev		231	0.95		
Against all		134	0.55	299	1.17
Total		24,404	100.00	25,589	100.00
Source: Cominf, Kavkaz Uzel (second round 87% counted)
