= Yuri Dzitstsoity =

South Ossetian politician

Vice-Speaker of Parliament of South Ossetia

Member of the Parliament of South Ossetia
- In office 1990–1994
- In office 2004–2014

Personal details
- Party: Iron (after 2024)
- Education: South Ossetian State Pedagogical Institute
- Occupation: Philologist

Yuri Dzitstsoity (Ossetic: Дзиццойты Юри, Dziccojty Yuri, Russian: Юрий Дзиццойты), also known by his patronymic, Yuri Albertovich, is an Ossetian politician from the partially recognized Caucasian Republic of South Ossetia, which most of the UN recognizes as part of Georgia, occupied by Russia.

== Biography ==
Prior to entering politics, in the 1970s Yuri Dzitstsoity worked as a professor of Philology at the South Ossetian State Pedagogical Institute recounting how in 1979 he, and Ossetian linguist Zamira Tshovrebova, attempted to publish a book on Ossetian grammar, which he claimed Georgian officials attempted to block the publication and distribution of.

=== Political career ===
Yuri Dzitstsoity's political career started when he was elected in the 1990 South Ossetian Supreme Soviet election, the event which triggered the beginning of the South Ossetia war, stating he ran as an Ossetian nationalist due to efforts by Georgia to erase the Ossetian language. In 1991, during the Dissolution of the Soviet Union, Yuri Dzitstsoity headed the "Central Commission for the Referendum on the preservation of the USSR" and also organized the 1992 South Ossetian independence referendum.

Yuri Dzitstsoity has been elected to the Parliament of South Ossetia three times, which, of the 221 people who have served as MPs, only six others have also been elected thrice. In 2005, as vice-speaker of Parliament, Yuri Dzitstsoity criticized the European Union's allocation of relief funds, stating that over 70% of the funds set aside for Transcaucasia have been spent in Georgia, and that the only project the EU worked on in South Ossetia was the reconstruction of a school in Java In 2008 Yuri Dzitstsoity was part of a state visit to Chechnya, alongside Minister of Health, Nugzar Gabaraev, and Commissioner for Human rights, David Sanakoev, where he stated that he hoped South Ossetia would be integrated into Russia, like Chechnya had been, sometime in the near future.

In 2012, as vice-speaker of Parliament, Yuri Dzitstsoity attended the inaugural congress of the new political party Ossetia - Liberty Square, congratulating the party and its founder, Alla Dzhioeva. Since 2012 Yuri Dzitstsoity has led a concerted effort to replace the use of the Russian language in South Ossetia with the Ossetian language, an effort which was promoted by then President Leonid Tibilov. Yuri Dzitstsoity led the Parliamentary Commission for the Preservation and Development of the Ossetian Language which mandated the translation of newspapers, radio, television, and magazines into Ossetian. The commission also sought to create new Ossetian words to end the use of predominately Russian and English loanwords, mostly on technological matters.

Yuri Dzitstsoity attempted to register for the 2012 South Ossetian presidential election, being the first candidate to pass the Ossetian language proficiency test, and to collect 500 signatures. However, his candidacy would be rejected by the Central Election Commission (CEC) due to "irregularities" in the signatures he collected.

In 2014 Yuri Dzitstsoity served as chairman of the Committee on Foreign Policy and Interparliamentary Relations, where he worked on formalizing a legal framework to assess Georgian "aggression" from 2004 to 2008.

In 2024 Yuri Dzitstsoity became the spokesmen for the new political party Iron, founded by Georgiy Kabisov.

=== Philologic advocacy ===
In 2014, Yuri Dzitstsoity gave an interview to Radio Free Europe outlining the progress that the government has taken to codifying and promoting the use of the Ossetian language, comparing it to the Czech National Revival. In 2017 Yuri Dzitstsoity was congratulated by then President Anatoly Bibilov for his contributions to Ossetian philology, namely his 1979 book.

In 2021 Yuri Dzitstsoity called for more government involvement in the revival of Ossetian, stating that his project does not have the necessary scientists and resources to effectively implement the changes from a Slavic to Iranian language in the country, namely, that the people who can speak Ossetian are mostly from rural regions, and are illiterate let alone devoid of a technical and scientific background. He also called on the South Ossetian government to make the revival of the Ossetian language its "scientific priority."
