= Vadim Brovtsev =

Russian businessman (1969–2024)

- Бровцеты Вадим (Iron Ossetic); Вадим Бровцев (Russian)
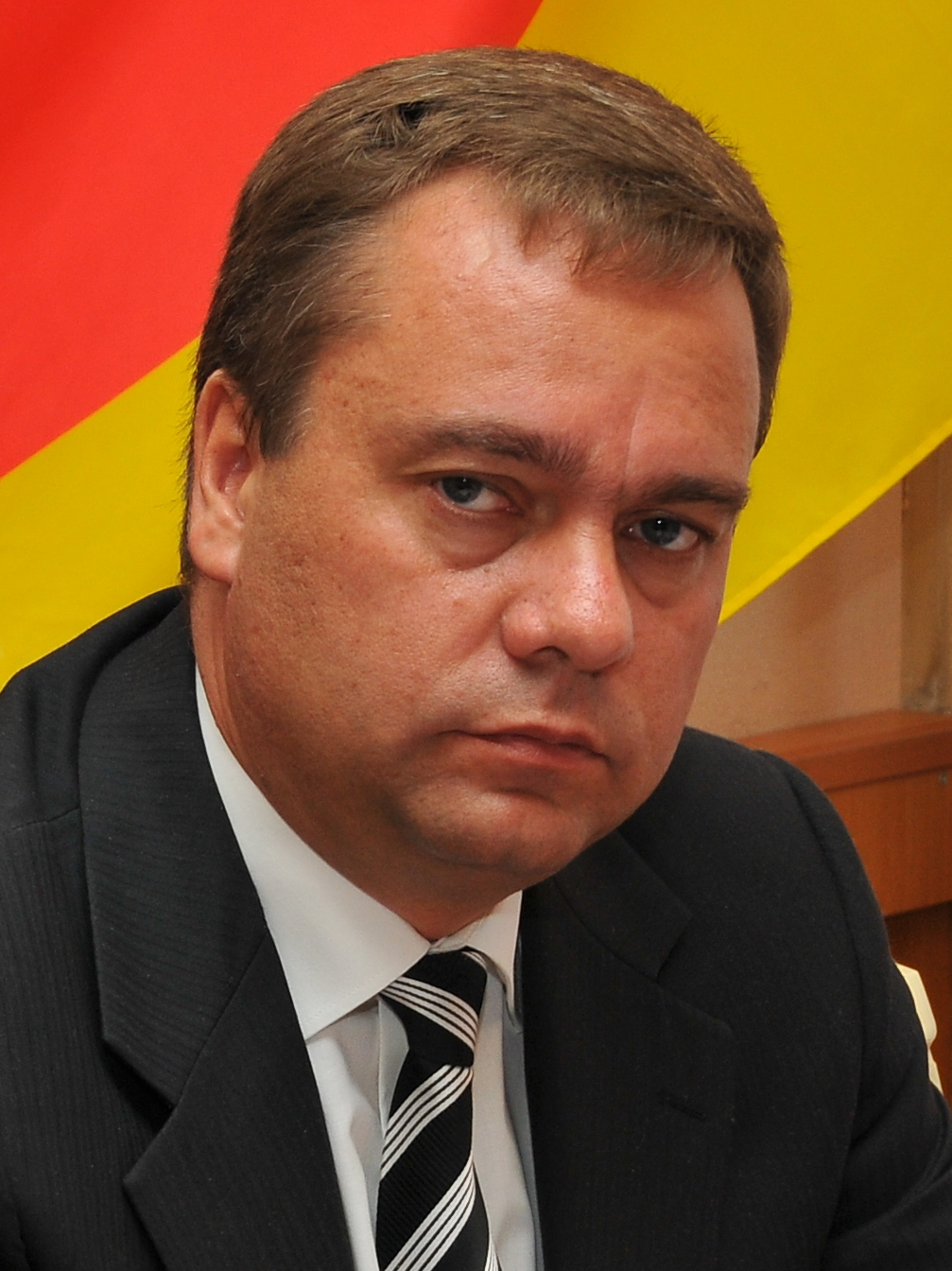
- Brovtsev in 2009

Prime Minister of South Ossetia
- In office 5 August 2009 – 26 April 2012
- President: Eduard Kokoity; Himself (acting); Leonid Tibilov
- Preceded by: Aslanbek Bulatsev
- Succeeded by: Rostislav Khugayev

Acting President of South Ossetia
- In office 11 December 2011 – 19 April 2012
- Prime Minister: Himself
- Preceded by: Eduard Kokoity
- Succeeded by: Leonid Tibilov

Personal details
- Born: 26 July 1969 Chelyabinsk-65, Chelyabinsk Oblast, Russian SFSR, Soviet Union
- Died: 14 November 2024 (aged 55) Lake Turgoyak, Chelyabinsk Oblast, Russia
- Party: Unity Party

Vadim Vladimirovich Brovtsev (Iron Ossetic: Бровцеты Владимиры фырт Вадим, romanized: Brovtsête Vlâdimire fert Vâdim; Russian: Вадим Владимирович Бровцев, Georgian: ვადიმ ბროვცევი, Vadim Brovcevi; 26 July 1969 – 14 November 2024) was a Russian businessman who was the prime minister of the Republic of South Ossetia from 5 August 2009 to 26 April 2012, as well as the acting president from 11 December 2011 to 19 April 2012.

Brovtsev had served in the Soviet Strategic Rocket Forces. From 2005 until his appointment to a political post, Brovtsev was head of the board of directors of Russian construction company Vermikulit based in the city of Chelyabinsk.

== Political life ==
Despite having no previous connection to South Ossetia, Brovtsev became Prime Minister of S.Ossetia after his predecessor, Aslanbek Bulatsev, was fired, according to the official decree, on health reasons, on 4 August 2009. 24 out of 27 MPs voted in favour of Brovtsev as the new PM. There were no other candidates.

In April 2010, Brovtsev came under heavy criticism from various sides. It was claimed that he did not manage Russia's monetary aid to rebuild destroyed South Ossetian buildings very well.

Several members of the South Ossetian parliament called for Brovtsev to resign, and brought a motion of no confidence to the parliamentary debating floor, which was discussed on 5 May. On 5 May, president Eduard Kokoity appeared before parliament, reiterating his support for Brovtsev.

Parliament still passed a motion, creating a commission to review the government's activities. The commission is to be led by deputy chairman of parliament and former Prime Minister Zurab Kokoyev, and among its other members is also former Prime Minister Merab Chigoev.

Meanwhile, Brovtsev has hit back by pointing at recent polls taken by the International Center of Political Analysis (MTsPA), which show an approval rating for Kokoity of 12.4%, with 66.3% of respondents having a negative opinion. Brovtsev, on the other hand is credited 37.8% positive and 10.9% negative. Kokoity's advisor Kosta Dzugaev called the poll "lies", stating that the MTsPA had never done any actual research in South Ossetia.

The MTsPA has been linked to the website rsoinform.com, a news agency reporting favorably about Brovtsev, which at first sight appears to be an official government information service. South Ossetian government press agency OSinform states, however, that it is not official and not registered in South Ossetia. It is speculated that Brovtsev himself is linked to these institutions.

In an effort to defend himself against media attacks, Brovtsev has sued several media. Apparently the lawsuit at first included OSInform, leading to a somewhat embarrassing situation for Brovtsev, who did not know OSInform is the South Ossetian state information agency.

== Personal life and death ==
Of Russian ethnicity, Brovtsev was born in Chelyabinsk-65 (now Ozyorsk) on 16 July 1969. He was married and had two children.

Brovtsev died from a heart attack on 14 November 2024, at the age of 55.

== Cabinet ==
Office	Incumbent
Prime Minister	Vadim Vladimirovich Brovtsev
Head of Administration of the President	Arsene Alanovich Gagloev
First Deputy Prime Minister of the Government	Aleksandr Aleksandrovich Zelig
Deputy Prime Minister	Domentiy Sardionovich Kulumbegov
Minister of Finance	Irina Andreevna Sytnik
Minister of Youth, Education and Science	Arjana Konstantinovna Dzhioeva
Minister of Foreign Affairs	Murat Kuzmich Dzhioev
Minister of Defence	Yuri Anvarovich Tanaev (until 27 July 2010)
Minister of Defence	Valery Adamovich Yahnovtsev (from 27 July 2010)
Minister of Internal Affairs	Valery Pavlovich Valiev
Minister for Civil Defense, Emergencies and Disaster Management	Anatoly Ilich Bibilov
Minister of Justice	Atsamaz Ivanovich Bichenov (until 19 October 2010)
Minister of Justice	Tamaz Sikoevich Doguzov (from 20 October 2010)
Minister of Economic Development	Aleksandr Ivanovich Zhmailo
Minister of Economic Development	Konstantin Mikhailovich Koliyev (from 19 October 2010)
Minister of Culture	Maharbeg Rutenovich Kokoyev
Minister of Health and Social Development	Otarbeg Mikhailovich Gassiev (post created 15 September 2010)
Minister of the Capital, Road Construction and Architecture	Chermen Pavlovich Hugaev (post created 24 January 2011)

Political offices
Preceded by Aslanbek Bulatsev	Prime Minister of South Ossetia; 2009–2012	Succeeded by Rostislav Khugayev
Preceded by Eduard Kokoity	President of South Ossetia; Acting; 2011–2012	Succeeded by Leonid Tibilov
