= 1999 South Ossetian parliamentary election =

← 1994	12 May 1999	2004 →
- 33 seats in the Parliament; 17 seats needed for a majority
Party	Leader	Seats	+/–
HIKP	Stanislav Kochiev	27	+8
Independent	Aleksandr Shavlokhov	2	−15
This lists parties that won seats. See the complete results below.
Prime Minister before	Prime Minister after
Aleksandr Shavlokhov; Independent	Aleksandr Shavlokhov; Independent

Parliamentary elections were held in South Ossetia on 12 May 1999. They were the third elections in the then unrecognized state since its de facto independence following the First South Ossetia War and the first elections after the territory became a semi-presidential republic with a new constitution ratified on 27 November 1996. Prior to this, South Ossetia had no executive branch of government, and the Speaker of Parliament was the head of state.

== Conduct ==
Following the 1992 war, South Ossetia had a working relationship with the Georgian government, namely though the Joint Control Commission for Georgian–Ossetian Conflict Resolution, and a $270,000 allocation for the region by the 1999 budget. Additionally, the South Ossetian constitution of 1996 reserved four of the 33 seats in Parliament for ethnic Georgians, which was welcomed by the Georgian government, who still decried the elections as illegal and invalid. Prior to the election of Eduard Kokoyty to the office of President of South Ossetia in 2001, most politicians in the Republic where either independents or Communists.

The same year Georgia had parliamentary elections and due to the ambiguous zones of control on the region, portions of South Ossetia voted either in the Georgian election, the South Ossetian election, both or neither. For example, a new election district, Liakhvi, was created for the Georgian election and consisted of portions of the former Tskhinvali district under Georgian control while its residents could still vote in the South Ossetian election. The Tskhinvali and Java districts would remain vacant in the Georgian election.

== Results ==
The results were a sweeping victory for the Communist Party of South Ossetia, which won 27 of the 33 seats with over 80% of the vote. Their leader, Stanislav Kochiev would be elected the Speaker of Parliament with 22 votes. The result was a major blow to the aspirations of independent President Lyudvig Chibirov, who was accused by his Communist opposition of working with the Georgian government to reach an agreement under which South Ossetia would rejoin Georgia, on the condition of local autonomy and an independent legislature from Tbilisi, similar to the South Ossetian Autonomous Oblast. This accusation, especially with most voters being veterans of the 1992 war, made Chibirov very unpopular. The four seats reserved for ethnic Georgians remained vacant, as the Georgian population boycotted the elections.

One of the two independents in parliament, Aleksandr Shavlokhov, would remain Prime Minister.

Party	Votes	%	Seats
Communist Party of South Ossetia		~80%	27
Independents		~20%	2
Vacant			4
Total			33
Source: RFERL
