= 2001 South Ossetian presidential election =

- 18 November 2001 (first round); 6 December 2001 (second round)
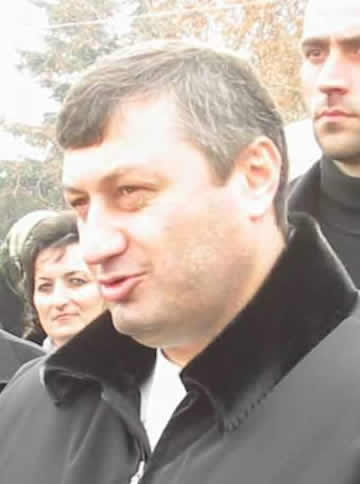

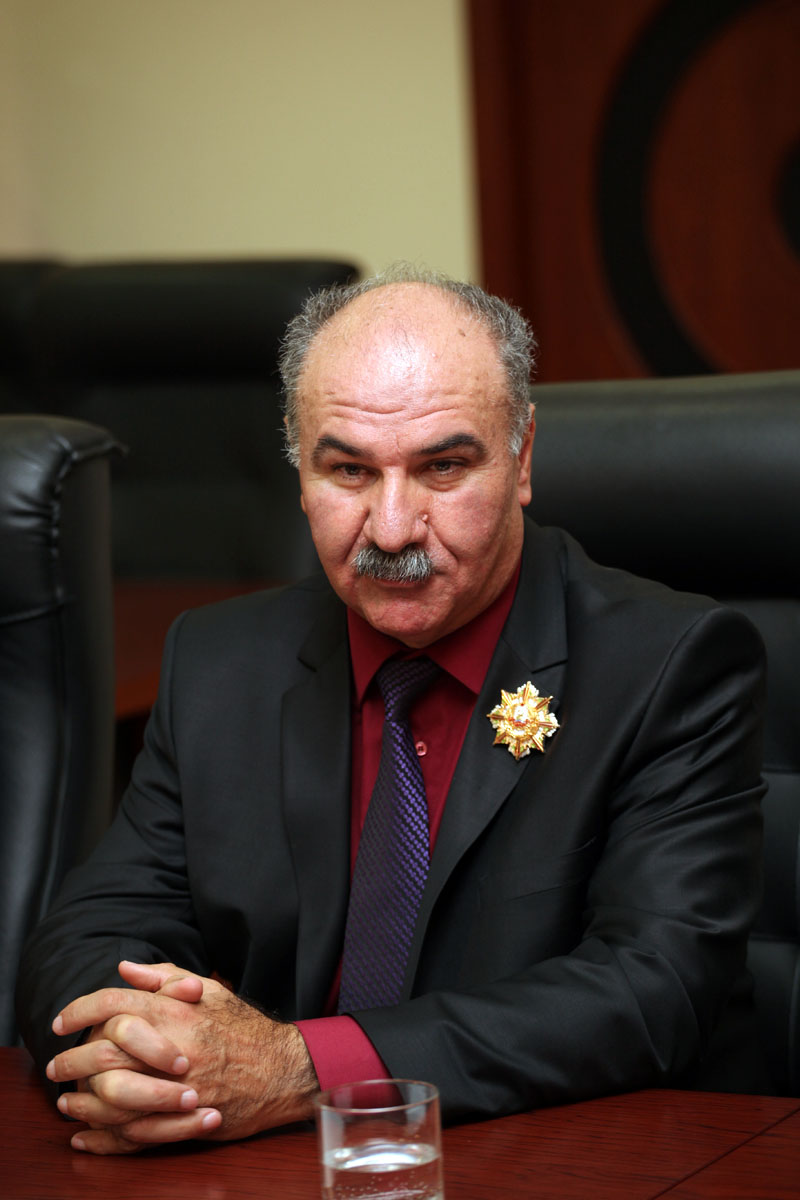
Nominee	Eduard Kokoity	Stanislav Kochiev
Party	Independent	HIKP
Popular vote	12,171	9,009
Percentage	57.46	42.54
President before election
Lyudvig Chibirov
Independent
Elected President
Eduard Kokoity
Independent

Presidential elections were held in South Ossetia in 2001. As no candidate received a majority of the vote in the first round on 18 November, a second round was held on 6 December, which was won by Eduard Kokoity, who defeated Stanislav Kochiev. Incumbent president Lyudvig Chibirov was eliminated in the first round mostly due to popular disdain in his economic policies. The elections were boycotted by the Georgian population.

== Electoral system ==
The election was held using the two-round system; meaning that a candidate would only be declared a winner if they received over 50% of the vote in the first round. If not a second round between the top two candidates will be held as a runoff election.

== Background ==
Since the Republic's creation the two political factions have been the Communist Party of South Ossetia and political independents. Incumbent president Lyudvig Chibirov was rocked with scandal when a rumor surfaced that he was negotiating with Georgian officials on the re-annexation of the republic into Georgia on the condition of a local autonomy slimier to the South Ossetian Autonomous Oblast. As such in the 1999 South Ossetian parliamentary election 27 of the 33 seats in Parliament were won by Communists, and their leader, Stanislav Kochiev, was named the Speaker of the South Ossetian Parliament. They were unsuccessful in their effort to force Chibirov to resign but used this election as an opportunity to remove him from office and finally control the executive branch of the government.

== Candidates ==
The three candidates were:

- Lyudvig Chibirov, incumbent president since 1996, and the former Chairman of the Presidium of the South Ossetian Supreme Council from 1993 to 1996
- Stanislav Kochiev, Former head of the ideological division of the South Ossetian regional branch of the Communist Party of the Soviet Union, leader of the Committee on National Affairs and the Ministry of Information and Press since 1991, Speaker of the South Ossetian Parliament, and First Secretary of the Communist Party of South Ossetia since 1994.
- Eduard Kokoity, Former Soviet wrestling champion, First Secretary of the Tskhinvali branch of the Komsomol until 1989, and a Moscow-based businessmen from 1992 to 2001.

== Results ==
The first round of the election was held on 19 November saw Kokoity receive 48% of the vote, followed by Kochiev with 25% and Chibirov in third with less than 20%. As no candidate received more than 50% of the vote, a runoff election was held on 6 December. The second round of the election saw a surge of votes for Kochiev and the Communist Party, bringing their share up from 25% to 42.5%. However, this was not enough to cross the 50% threshold and the frontrunner Kokoity was elected with 57.5% of the vote.

Candidate	Party	First round		Second round	
Candidate	Party	Votes	%	Votes	%
Eduard Kokoity	Independent		48	12,171	57.46
Stanislav Kochiev	Communist Party of South Ossetia		25	9,009	42.54
Lyudvig Chibirov	Independent		>20		
Total				21,180	100.00

== Aftermath ==
Following his victory Kokoity assumed office on 18 December 2001.
