= Sanakoyev =

Sanakoyev or Sanakoev (Russian: Санакоев), feminine: Sanakoyeva or Sanakoeva, is a Russian-language surname of Ossetian origin. It is a patronymic surname derived from the Ossetian given name Sanako (Iron Ossetic: Санахъо) by adding the patronymic suffix -ev/yev. The native Ossetian form is Санахъоты, Sanakoty. Modern Russian transliterations are Санакоты/Санакоти, Sanakoty/Sanakoti. The Georgian language form of the family name is Sanakoshvili, derived with the Georgian patronymic suffix shvili. The surname may refer to the following notable people:

- David Sanakoev (born 1976), Ossetian politician
- Dmitry Sanakoyev (born 1969), South Ossetian and Georgian politician
- Grigory Sanakoev (1935–2021), Russian chess player
- Igor Sanakoyev (born 1946), South Ossetian politician
