= Khugaev =

Khugaev or Khugayev is a surname. Notable people with the surname include:

- Alan Khugaev (born 1989), Russian wrestler
- Gerasim Khugayev (born 1946), South Ossetian politician
- Gocha Khugaev (born 1984), Russian Paralympic athlete
- Khetag Khugaev (born 1997), Russian weightlifter
- Rolan Khugayev (born 1985), Russian footballer
- Rostislav Khugayev (born 1951), South Ossetian politician
