= CPSO (disambiguation) =

CPSO may refer to:

- Calcasieu Parish Sheriff's Office, Louisiana, United States, a police force
- College of Physicians and Surgeons of Ontario, regulates doctors in Ontario, Canada
- Communist Party of South Ossetia
