= National University of Architecture and Construction of Armenia =

Public university in Yerevan, Armenia

Yerevan State University of Architecture and Construction
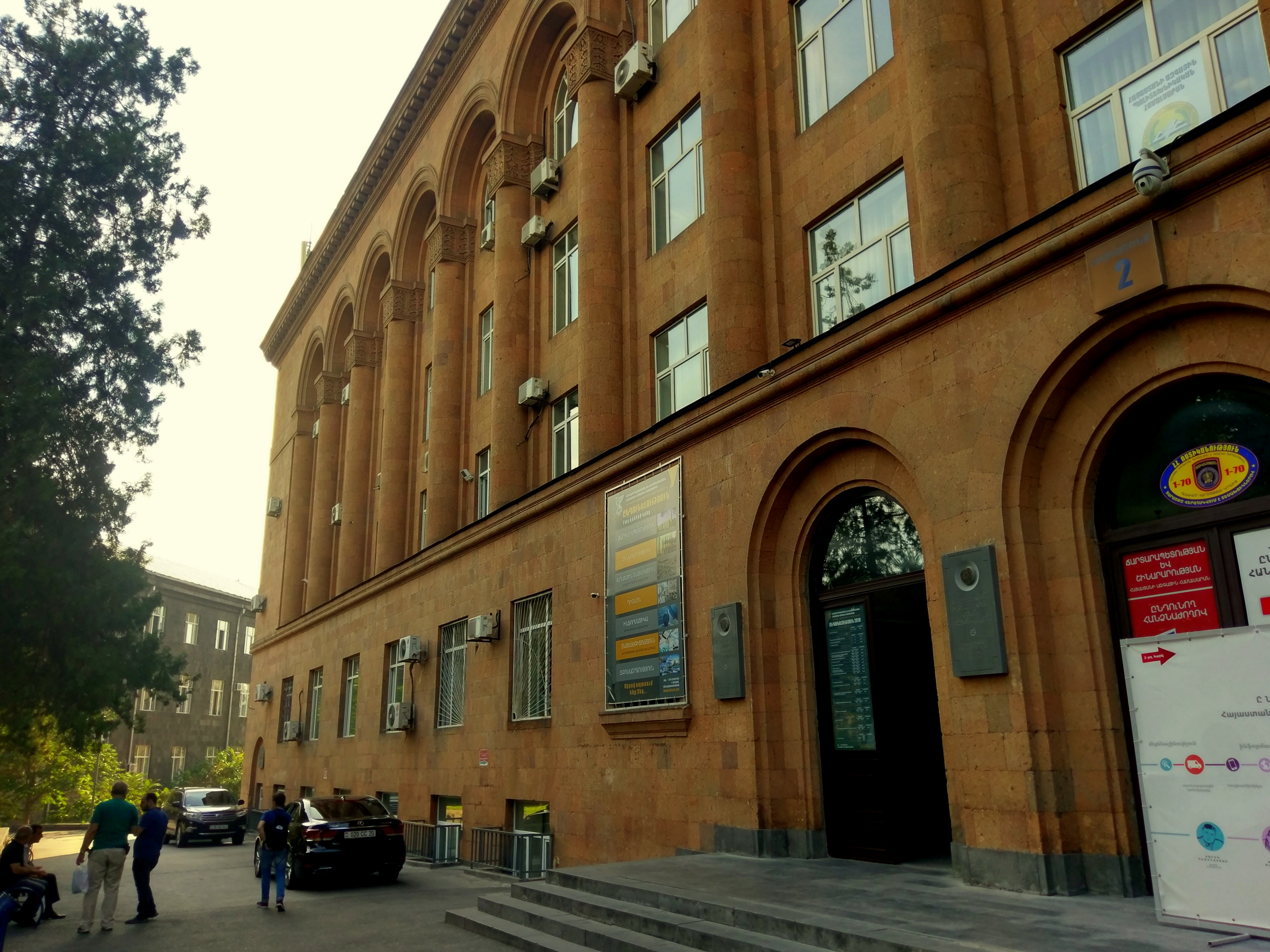
- Type: Public
- Established: 1921; 105 years ago
- Rector: Gagik Galstyan
- Location: Yerevan, Armenia; 40°11′26.35″N 44°31′18.39″E
- Website: nuaca.am

University rankings

Regional – Overall
- QS Emerging Europe and Central Asia: 251-300 (2022)

National University of Architecture and Construction of Armenia (NUACA) (Armenian: Ճարտարապետության և շինարարարության Հայաստանի ազգային համալսարան, ՃՇՀԱՀ), is a state university in Yerevan, Armenia.

== History ==
A technical school opened within the newly established Yerevan State University in 1921, graduating its first students in 1928. In July 1930, the Armenian Construction Institute, which by this stage had departments of Architecture and Construction, Hydrology and Chemical Engineering, was established with prominent architect Mikayel Mazmanyan as its first director.

On 11 July 1989, on the basis of the related departments and chairs of the National Polytechnic University of Armenia, the Architectural/Construction Institute was established by the decree of the Armenian SSR Council of Ministers. It was renamed as the Yerevan State University of Architecture and Construction in 2000. Its first rector was Arest Baglaryan who served between 1989 and 2006, since which time Professor Hovhannes Tokmajyan has been the rector.

In 2014, the university was renamed as the National University of Architecture and Construction of Armenia (NUACA).

In 2020, the National University of Architecture and Construction of Armenia established the Great Caucasus format together with the Abkhazian State University, the Russian North-Caucasus Federal University and the South Ossetian State University. The four universities will work more together and spread the use of the Russian language.

== Faculties ==
Currently, the university has 5 faculties:

- Faculty of Architecture.
- Faculty of Design.
- Faculty of Management and Technology.
- Faculty of Urban Economy and Ecology.
- Faculty of Construction.
