= Yury Morozov =

Russian and South Ossetian businessman and politician

- Юрий Морозов

Prime Minister of South Ossetia
- In office 5 July 2005 – 18 August 2008
- President: Eduard Kokoity
- Preceded by: Zurab Kokoyev
- Succeeded by: Boris Chochiev

Personal details
- Born: 5 August 1949 (age 76) Sterlitamak, Bashkir ASSR, Russian SFSR, Soviet Union

Yury Ionovich Morozov (Russian: Юрий Ионович Морозов; born 5 August 1949) is a Russian businessman and politician, and a former Prime Minister of South Ossetia. Morozov was confirmed by the Parliament of South Ossetia on 5 July 2005. 23 Out of 24 MPs present voted in favour of his candidacy. On 18 August 2008, it was announced that Morozov and his government had been dismissed by South Ossetian President Eduard Kokoity. Kokoity said he thought the government was not handling the emergency aid from Russia, which was arriving after the 2008 South Ossetia war, good enough.

According to accounts of several South Ossetian military and political leaders, Morozov fled Tskhinvali at onset of Georgian attack. Anatoly Bibilov, then deputy commander of North Ossetian peacekeeping battalion, claimed that already at 5 am of 8 August 2008 (6 hours after the bombardment of Tskhinvali had started), Morozov was in Vladikavkaz. Boris Chochiev, then Deputy Prime Minister of South Ossetia, has also claimed that when he connected with Morozov on the phone on 8 August and asked to help organize evacuation of women and children, Morozov was in Vladikavkaz and effectively declined any responsibility, exclaiming "F## you and your children!"

== Cabinet ==
Office	Incumbent
Prime Minister	Yury Ionovich Morozov
Head of Administration of the President	Eduard Sergeevich Kotaev
Deputy Prime Minister	Boris Eliozovich Chochiev
Minister of Health	Dzhemal Vahtangovich Dzhigkaev
Minister of Youth, Sport and Tourism	Rufin Burdimovich Dzhioev
Minister of Finance	Aza Konstantinovna Khabalova
Minister of Foreign Affairs	Murat Kuzmich Dzhioev
Minister of Defence and Emergencies	Anatoly Konstantinovich Barankevich
Minister of Internal Affairs	Mikhail Mindzayev Mayramovich
Minister of Justice	Merab Ilyich Chigoev
Minister of Transport and Road Management	Rudolf Andreevich Chovrebov
Minister of Economy and Foreign Economic Relations	Rodion Inalovich Dzhussoev
Minister of Natural Resources	Atarbeg Ismailovich Tedeyev
Minister of Agriculture, Land and Water Resources	Aleksandr Ilyich Pukhaev
Minister of Education	Alla Alekseevna Dzhioeva
Minister of Culture	Konstantin Petrovich Pukhaev

Political offices
Preceded by Zurab Kokoyev	Prime Minister of South Ossetia; 2005–2008	Succeeded by Boris Chochiev
