= 2012 South Ossetian presidential election =

- 25 March 2012 (first round); 8 April 2012 (second round)
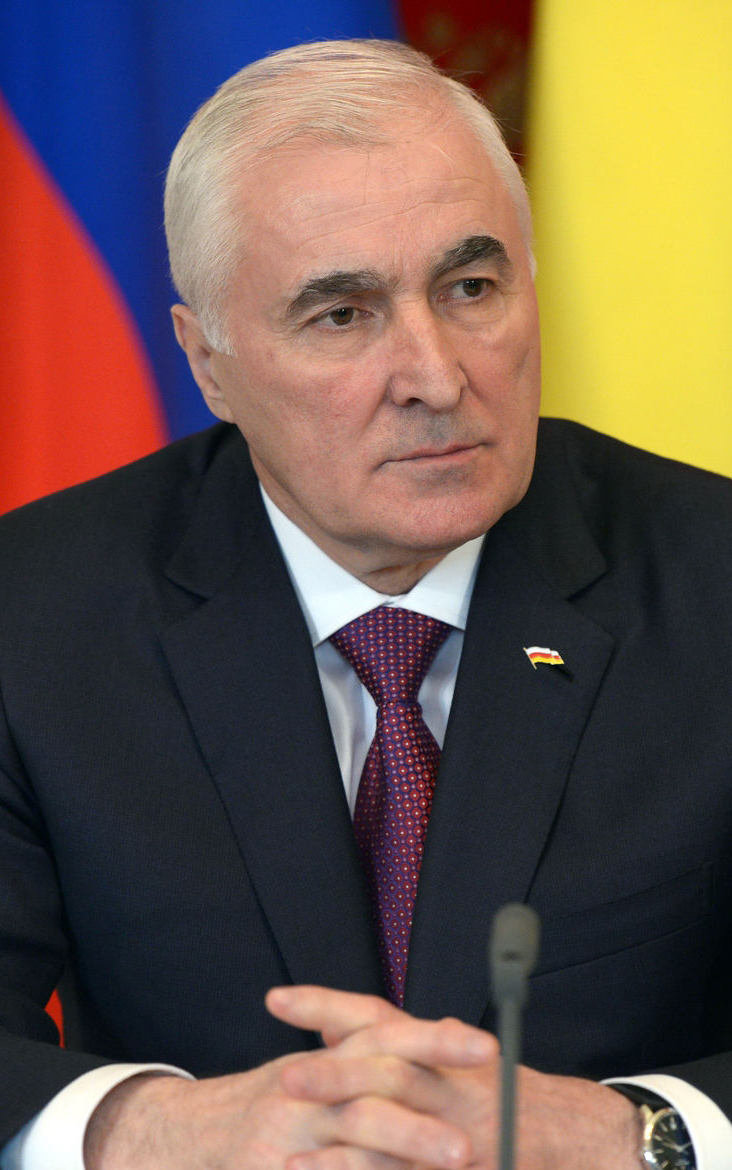

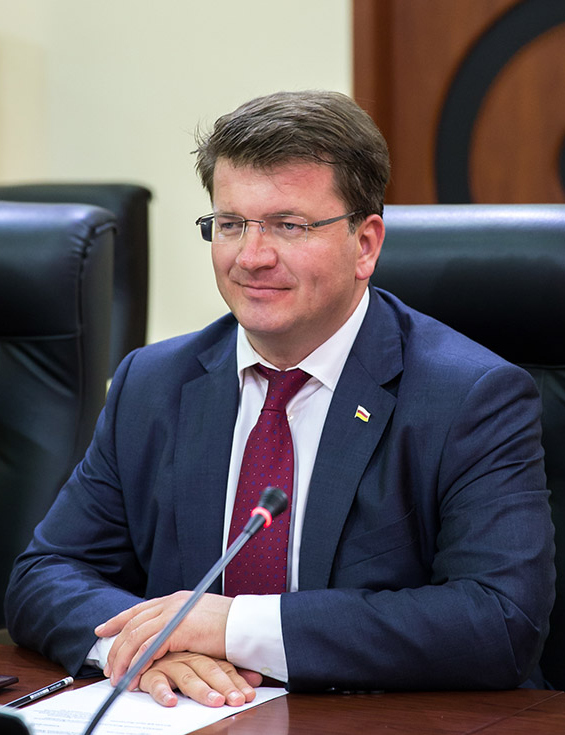
Nominee	Leonid Tibilov	David Sanakoev
Party	Independent	Independent
Popular vote	15,786	12,439
Percentage	55.38%	43.64%
Acting President before election
Vadim Brovtsev
Independent
President
Leonid Tibilov
Independent

Presidential elections were held in South Ossetia on 25 March 2012, with a second round on 8 April. The election selected the first president since the country gained partial international recognition.

== Background ==
The date was set by the parliament after the 2011 election was annulled by the Supreme Court after Alla Dzhioyeva was disqualified following allegations of electoral violations by Anatoly Bibilov. A deal was reached on 9 December 2011 under which the incumbent Kokoity stepped down at the end of his mandate and was replaced by Prime Minister Vadim Brovtsev as acting president. Though Dzhioyeva was previously barred from running again, she was allowed to register in the re-run of the election. However, Kokoity and his supporters reneged on parts of the deal, calling into question the stability of the compromise.

== Candidates ==
No candidate participating in the 2011 election registered, including the previous leaders Dzihoyeva and Bibilov. There were four registered candidates:

- Leonid Haritonovich Tibilov, candidate in the 2006 election.
- David Georgievich Sanakoev, human rights commissioner and war criminal.
- Dmitriy Nikolayevich Medoyev, ambassador of South Ossetia to Russia and backed by Russia.
- Stanislav Yakovlevich Kochiyev, chairman of the Communist Party of South Ossetia and speaker of the Parliament of South Ossetia.

Dzhioyeva did not register to run in the election after she was in hospital with allegations of being beaten and held against her will.

Another candidate from 2011, Georgiy Kabisov, attempted to register twice, but both times was rejected by the central election commission.

Yuri Dzitssuty, the vice-speaker of Parliament, attempted to register as a candidate. However, he was rejected by the central election commission due to "irregularities" in the 500 signatures he collected.

== Campaign ==
Tibilov and Sanakoyev disagreed with former President Eduard Kokoity who said that South Ossetia would eventually be a part of Russia. Sanakoyev said: "In November–December [2011], it became very clear that those supported by Kokoity did not win. Everyone saw it."

== Opinion poll ==
A week before the election, an opinion poll by the IR media centre suggested Medoyev or Tibilov would win.

== Monitors ==
In addition to Russian observers the election commission said that it would call on the Council of Europe.

== Results ==
With 40% of the votes counted, Tibilov was in the lead with 42.5% of the votes, Sanakoyev followed with 24.6% of the votes, Medoyev was third with 23.80% of the votes and Kochiyev trailed with 5.62% of votes counted. First round turnout was over 65%, with expatriate voting still to be counted. Without an absolute winner the election was set for a run off.

The second round occurred on Easter with 84 voting centres opening at 8:00 for the 35,000 registered voters. The preliminary result with 95.64% of the ballots counted, indicated Tibilov winning with 53.74%, or 15,257, of the votes, with Sanakoyev getting 42.98%, or 12,272, of the votes.

Candidate	Party	First round		Second round	
Candidate	Party	Votes	%	Votes	%
Leonid Tibilov	Independent	11,453	43.83	15,786	55.38
David Sanakoyev	Independent	6,627	25.36	12,439	43.64
Dmitry Medoyev	Independent	6,415	24.55		
Stanislav Kochiyev	Communist Party of South Ossetia	1,417	5.42		
Against all		216	0.83	279	0.98
Total		26,128	100.00	28,504	100.00
Valid votes		26,128	96.91	28,504	97.73
Invalid/blank votes		832	3.09	662	2.27
Total votes		26,960	100.00	29,166	100.00
Registered voters/turnout		39,030	69.08	40,929	71.26
Source: RES, CIK

== Reactions ==
After the first round, Tibilov said that "today's figures show that my candidacy is taken normally. Let's hope the second round confirms this." He also denied having Russian backing, but said that he would consult Russia in choosing his new government.

- Georgia – deputy Foreign Minister Nino Kalandadze said that South Ossetia "staged a farce. No one will recognise these elections, no matter who wins."

Minister for Reintegration Eka Tkeshelashvili said of that the election that it was "a continuation of farce and an imitation of elections in the Russian-occupied ethnically-cleansed region."

- Russia – after the first round, the Public Chamber's Maxim Grigoryev said that there were not "material breaches."
- United States – the embassy in Georgia said it does not recognise the election.
