= 2009 South Ossetian parliamentary election =

- 31 May 2009
- 34 seats in the Parliament; 18 seats needed for a majority
Party	Leader	Vote %	Seats	+/–
Unity Party	Aslanbek Bulatsev	47.53	17	−3
People's Party	Kazimir Pliyev	23.14	9	
HIKP	Stanislav Kochiev	22.80	8	
This lists parties that won seats. See the complete results below.
Prime Minister before	Prime Minister after
Aslanbek Bulatsev; Unity Party	Aslanbek Bulatsev; Unity Party

Parliamentary elections were held in South Ossetia on 31 May 2009. The result was a victory for the ruling Unity Party, which won seventeen of the 34 seats. Two opposition parties were not permitted to run out of concern that they might not be loyal to President Eduard Kokoity.

Under laws of Georgia, the elections were illegal.

The European Union, the United States, and NATO have issued statements saying these organisations consider the elections illegal, and have rejected their results.

== Background ==
The Republic of South Ossetia has a population of about 70,000. It has had de facto independence from central Georgian rule since the 1991–1992 South Ossetia War. After the August 2008 South Ossetia war, Russia recognized the independence of South Ossetia, followed by Nicaragua. Other countries, including Georgia, consider South Ossetia part of Georgia's constitutional territory.

== Campaign ==
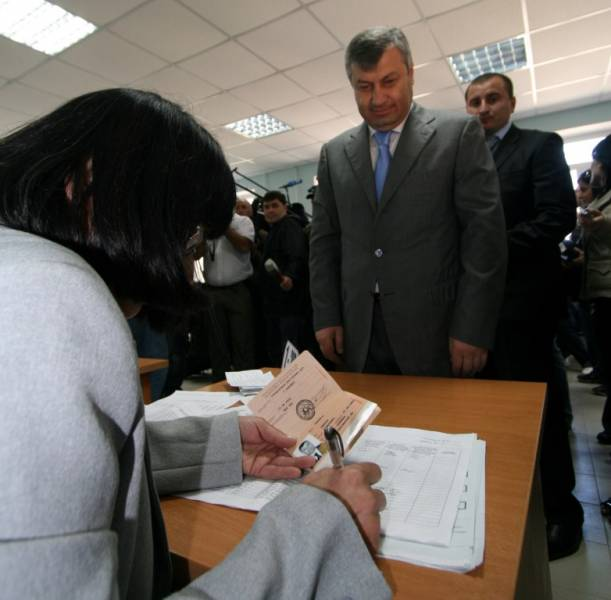
President Eduard Kokoity voting in the 2009 parliamentary elections

Four parties were contesting for 34 seats in the Parliament of South Ossetia. According to the central election commission, 45,000 people were registered to vote on Sunday. This was the first South Ossetian election since the republic obtained its limited international recognition in 2008. About 100 Russian and international reporters arrived in South Ossetia to cover the event. Voters were able to cast ballots at 95 polling stations, 88 in South Ossetia and 7 in Russia (6 of them opened in North Ossetia and 1 in Moscow). No other overseas polling stations were open.

== Structure ==
The election was conducted using the party-list proportional representation system with a 7% election threshold. For South Ossetian authorities to consider the election valid, the voter turnout would have been at least 50% + 1 vote, and at least two parties would have acquired securing seats in the parliament. If these criteria hadn't been fulfilled, the South Ossetian legislation provided for a repeat election in four months.

== Parties ==
The following parties participated in the election:

- Unity Party
- Communist Party of South Ossetia
- People's Party of South Ossetia
- Fatherland Socialist Party

The Unity Party is the ruling party in the current parliament. According to Reuters, Unity, Communists, and the People's party support the current President Eduard Kokoity, while the Fatherland Socialist Party opposes him. Two opposition parties were barred from running.

== Opinion polls ==
Date	Institute	Unity	Communist	People's	FSP	Against all	Undecided
31 March 2009	IA "Res"	22%	32%	16%	22%	8%	n/a
21 April 2009	IA "Res"	19%	29%	14%	19%	19%	n/a
26 April–15 May 2009	IA "Res"	31.6%	12.8%	7.0%	7.2%	19.0%	22.0%

== Results ==
As of 10:00 UTC, 59.88% of registered voters had cast their votes, crossing the electoral threshold of 50% plus one vote. The South Ossetian election commission has thus declared the elections valid.

According to the preliminary results, the Unity Party has obtained the most votes with 46.38% of the vote, followed by People's Party with 22.58% and the Communists with 22.25%, thus securing 17, 9 and 8 parliament seats respectively, while the Fatherland Socialist Party fell just short of passing the 7% threshold with only 6.37%. The official results were expected by June 7.

According to the final results, the Unity Party won 17 seats with 21,246 votes, the People's Party won nine seats with 10,345 votes and the Communist Party won eight seats with 10,194 votes.

Party	Votes	%	Seats
Unity Party	21,246	47.53	17
People's Party of South Ossetia	10,345	23.14	9
Communist Party of South Ossetia	10,194	22.80	8
Fatherland Socialist Party	2,918	6.53	0
Total	44,703	100.00	34
Valid votes	44,703	97.58	
Invalid/blank votes	1,110	2.42	
Total votes	45,813	100.00	
Registered voters/turnout	55,980	81.84	
Source: Cominf

== Reaction ==
International observers
Group of 11 observers, representing Italy, Germany, Poland, and Russia noted the election was held 'complying with common democratic standards. Italian Communist and Russophile MEP Giulietto Chiesa commented:

These elections were a model of democracy.

Europe
The EU refused to accept either the legality of the election or its results.
NATO
The Secretary-General of NATO, Jaap de Hoop Scheffer said the alliance did not recognize the elections and reiterated "its full support for the sovereignty and territorial integrity of Georgia within its internationally recognized borders".
Georgia
Georgia dismissed the election as illegitimate. Temur Iakobashvili, the State Minister for Reintegration commented:

What they in South Ossetia call elections are very far from real elections.

Nothing but clownery, a farce and a redistribution of criminal power.

United States
The United States denounced the elections "as a step away from a peaceful and negotiated solution to the conflict" and refused to "recognize neither the legality nor the results."
