= North-Caucasus Federal University =

University in Russia

- Северо-Кавказский Федеральный Университет
- Other names: NCFU
- Type: Public University
- Established: 1930
- Accreditation: Federal Service for Supervision in Education and Science (Russia)
- Rector: Dmitry Nikolaevich Bespalov
- Academic staff: over 2,000
- Students: 25,000 from 59 countries
- Postgraduates: 1,000
- Location: 2 Kulakova Ave., Stavropol, Russia 355029; 1 Puskhin St., Stavropol, Russia 355017; Pyatigorsk, Russia; Nevinnomyssk, Russia
- Campus: Urban
- Language: Russian, English, French
- Colors: Blue and white
- Mascot: Southern Elephant (Russian: Южный слон)
- Website: http://www.ncfu.ru/ Building details
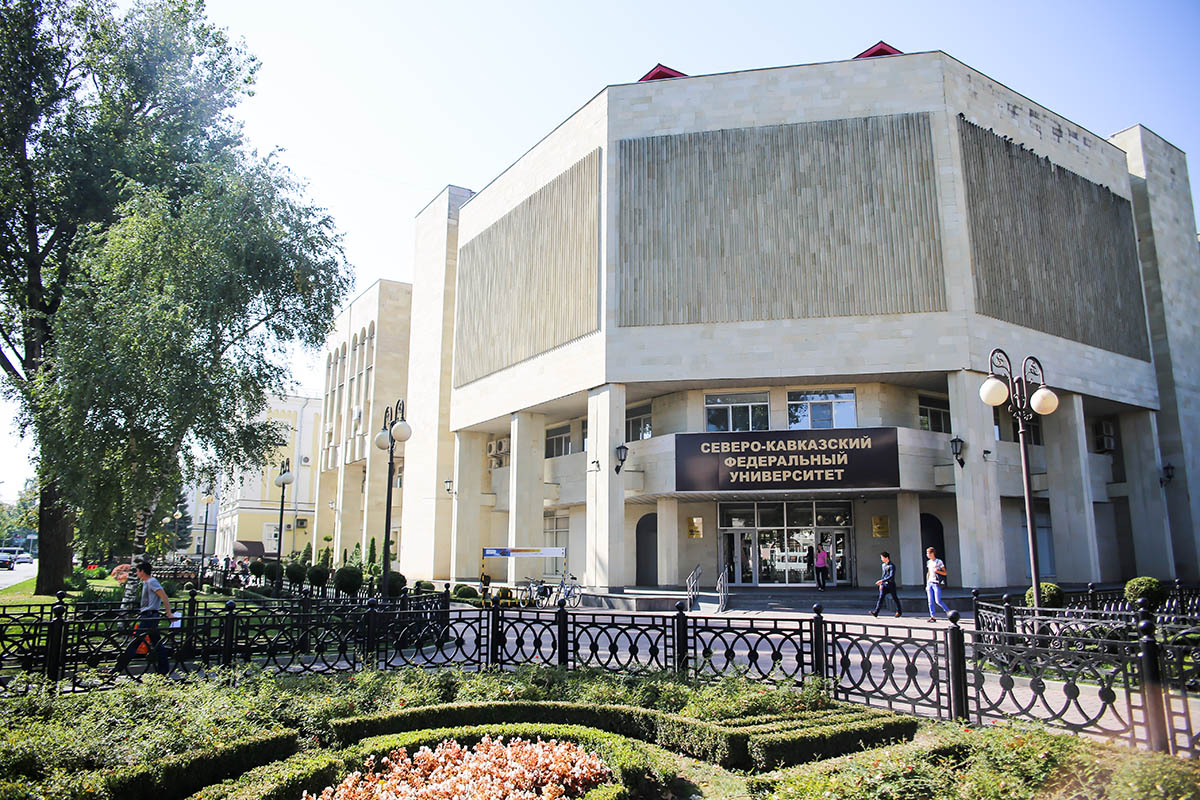

General information
- Coordinates: 45°02′27″N 41°54′37″E

University rankings

Regional – Overall
- QS Emerging Europe and Central Asia: 251-300 (2022)

North-Caucasus Federal University (Russian: Северо-Кавказский федеральный университет), abbreviated as NCFU (Russian: СКФУ) is a public university in Stavropol Krai, Russia with campuses in Stavropol, Pyatigorsk and Nevinnomyssk. It was established in 2012 as a flagship university of the newly created North Caucasian Federal District by merging Stavropol State University, North-Caucasus State Technical University, and Pyatigorsk State University of Humanities and Technology.

== General information ==
North-Caucasus Federal University (NCFU) was established subject to a respective Decree by President of the Russian Federation (No. 958 of July 18, 2011) and an Order by the Government of the Russian Federation (No. 226-p of February 22, 2012) through a merger of three universities located in the Stavropol Region – North-Caucasus State Technical University, Stavropol State University and Pyatigorsk State University for Humanities & Technology. The university comprises 9 institutes in Stavropol and 2 institutes (affiliates) in Pyatigorsk and Nevinnomyssk.

== University rankings ==
NCFU was rated among 40 top Russian universities (according to the National university ranking by Interfax).

Originated by	Name of university ranking	2019
QS QuacquarelliSydmonds	QS World University Rankings (EECA University Rankings)	251-300
QS QuacquarelliSydmonds	QS World University Rankings (BRICS Rankings)	231-240
SCImago	The SCImago Institutions Rankings (SIR) (Higher educ.)	619
Interfax	National university ranking	35

== Aims and objectives ==
NCFU mission is to develop human and intellectual capital thus promoting competitive social and economic development in the areas of the Russian Federation that belong to North-Caucasus Federal District.

== Institutes and faculties ==
- Institute of Humanities
- Institute of Engineering
- Institute of Digital Development
- Institute of Geosciences
- Institute of Law
- Institute of Economics and Management
- Faculty of Physics and Technology
- Faculty of Chemistry and Pharmacy
- Faculty of Psychology and Education
- Faculty of Food Engineering and Biotechnology
- Faculty of Physical Culture and Sport
- Faculty of Medicine and Biology
- Faculty of Mathematics and Computer Sciences named after Professor N.I. Cheryakova
- Graduate School of Creative Industries
- College of NCFU (Stavropol)
- Military Training Center

== Affiliates ==
- Institute of Technology (NCFU branch in Nevinnomyssk, Russia);
- Institute of Service, Tourism and Design (NCFU branch in Pyatigorsk, Russia).

== Major academic fields ==
- Information technologies
- Applied mathematics
- Information security
- Electronics
- Nanotechnologies
- Power energy
- Oil and gas
- Geosciences
- Ecology and environmental management
- Engineering
- Biology
- History
- Economy
- Management
- Tourism and hospitality
- Humanities
- Social sciences
- Law studies
- Pedagogy
- Psychology
- Physics
- Chemistry
- Linguistics
- Design

== Major research fields ==
- Organic chemistry, pharmaceutical chemistry
- Nanotechnologies and advanced materials
- Technologies of life science, food safety and food biotechnology
- Aerospace and geoinformation technologies, land-use planning
- Neurocomputers, parallel and high-performance computing
- Complex information security of infrastructure facilities
- Energy efficiency
- Ethnodemography, conflictology studies
- Socio-political and humanitarian research and technology, the culture and traditions of the North-Caucasus ethnic groups

Originated by	Name of university ranking	2019
Russian science citation index	Higher educational institutions of the Russian Federation, i-citation index in Russian science citation index	27
Rating agency expert (RAEX) Analytics	Top-50 Russian universities in the field of “Information technologies” (RAEX)	46
Rating agency expert (RAEX) Analytics	Top-50 Russian universities in the field of “Economics and management” (RAEX)	24
Analytical center “Expert”	Subject ranking of scientific efficiency (Faculties ranking) “Economics and management”	27
Analytical center “Expert”	Subject ranking of scientific efficiency (Faculties ranking) “Humanities”	27
Analytical center “Expert”	Subject ranking of scientific efficiency (Faculties ranking) “Social sciences”	19-23

== International partners ==
The university has a number of relationships with universities in more than 40 countries.

In 2020, the North-Caucasus Federal University established the Great Caucasus format together with the Abkhazian State University, the National University of Architecture and Construction of Armenia and the South Ossetian State University. The four universities will work more together and spread the use of the Russian language.

== Human capital ==
The university has an academic staff of around 1,500 members. Student body of about 25,000. From 2017 on, following a respective order by the Russian Ministry of Science and Higher Education, a Resource Training Center for Persons with Disabilities has been functioning at NCFU. Alina Levitskaia – Rector, NCFU; 2012 to August, 2019. Irina Soloveva – Acting Rector, NCFU; August – October, 2019. November 2019 – Dmitry Bespalov was appointed as NCFU's Acting Rector and in July 2020, by order of the Government of the Russian Federation, he was appointed to the post of rector of the North Caucasus Federal University.

== History ==
- Stavropol Agropedagogic Institute (1930), thereafter
- Stavropol State Pedagogic Institute (1932)
- Stavropol State Pedagogic University (1993)
- Stavropol State University (through integration with an affiliate of Moscow State Academy of Law) (1996)
- Stavropol Polytechnic Institute[24] (1971)
- Stavropol State Technical University (1994)
- North-Caucasus State Technical University (1999)
- Pyatigorsk State University for Humanities & Technology (1999) (subject to the Decree by Prime Minister of the Russian Federation V.V. Putin
- On January 23, 2010, was officially announced as launched
- On July 18, 2011, President of the Russian Federation signed a Decree establishing North-Caucasus Federal University on the premises of North-Caucasus State Technical University
- On February 22, 2012 North-Caucasus Federal University was officially declared established by a special Decree
