= Gennady Bekoyev =

South Ossetian politician

Gennady Borisovich Bekoyev
- Геннадий Бекойты (Iron Ossetic); Геннадий Бекоев (Russian)

15th Prime Minister of South Ossetia
- In office 29 August 2020 – 20 June 2022
- President: Anatoliy Bibilov; Alan Gagloyev
- Preceded by: Erik Pukhayev
- Succeeded by: Konstantin Dzhussoev

Personal details
- Born: 26 August 1981 (age 44) South Ossetian AO, Georgian SSR, Soviet Union

Gennady Borisovich Bekoyev (Russian: Геннадий Борисович Бекоев, Iron Ossetic: Бекойты Борисы фырт Геннадий, romanized: Bekojty Borisy fyrt Gennadij; born 26 August 1981) is a South Ossetian politician who served as prime minister of South Ossetia from 2020 to 2022. He is an independent.

== Political career ==
Bekoyev started working for South Ossetia's defense ministry as a public administrator in 2004. He became the head of the South Ossetian industry committee in 2017. He was appointed by incumbent president Anatoily Bibilov as the deputy prime minister in 2018.

Bibilov announced the dismissal of then-prime minister Pukhayev on 29 August 2020. Pukhayev announced that he was stepping down from his position due to the demands of protestors. The protestors were protesting the Murder of Inal Djabiev who, according to his murders, attempted to assassinate the Interior Minister, Igor Naniev. Naniev was suspended from his duties indefinitely until an investigation was complete. To fill the position left by Pukhayev's dismissal, Bibilov appointed Bekoyev as the acting prime minister, a step up from his former post as deputy prime minister. Bekoyev was sworn in on 29 August 2020 to the position President Anatoly Bibilov.

Bekoyev was succeeded by Konstantin Dzhussoev on 20 June 2022.

Personal life

Married, with three children
