= Aslanbek Bulatsev =

Russian politician

- Асланбек Булацев

Prime Minister of South Ossetia
- In office 22 October 2008 – 4 August 2009
- President: Eduard Kokoity
- Preceded by: Boris Chochiev (Acting)
- Succeeded by: Vadim Brovtsev

Personal details
- Born: 3 May 1963 (age 62) Mikhaylovskoye, North Ossetian ASSR, Soviet Union
- Party: Unity Party

Aslanbek Soltanovich Bulatsev (Russian: Асланбек Солтанович Булацев; born 3 May 1963) is a South Ossetian politician. Bulatsev formerly worked as a tax chief in the Russian region of North Ossetia. On 22 October 2008 he was appointed Prime Minister of the Republic of South Ossetia by the South Ossetian parliament. Bulatsev was fired, according to the official decree, on health reasons, on 4 August 2009. He was replaced by Vadim Brovtsev, the head of a Russian construction company.

== Cabinet ==
Bulatsev's cabinet at the time of its dismissal consisted of 19 ministers. The Head of Administration of the President is also included.

Office	Incumbent
Prime Minister	Aslanbek Soltanovich Bulatsev
Head of Administration of the President	Alexander Mikhailovich Bolshakov
First Deputy Prime Minister of the Government	Hasan Soslanovich Pliev
Deputy Prime Minister and Minister of Industry and Trade	Taimuraz Arahmatovich Chochiev
Deputy Prime Minister and Minister of Health and Social Development	Nugzar Antonovich Gabaraev
Deputy Prime Minister and Minister of Youth, Sport and Tourism	Eleonora Hristoforovna Bedoeva
Deputy Prime Minister and Minister of Finance	İnal Vladimirovich Puxaev
Minister of Foreign Affairs	Murat Kuzmich Dzhioev
Minister of Defence	Yuri Anvarovich Tanaev
Minister of Internal Affairs	Valery Pavlovich Valiev
Minister of Civil Defense, Emergencies and Elimination of Consequences of Natural Disasters	Anatoly Ilich Bibilov
Minister of Justice	Atsamaz Ivanovich Bichenov
Minister of Transport and Road Management	Alan Hadzhimurzaevich Koliev
Minister of Communications and Information	Georgij Sergeevich Kabisov
Minister of Economic Development	Igor Yurevich Beppiev
Minister of state property and land relations	Sergei Vladimirovich Parastaev
Minister of Natural Resources and Ecology	Vitaly Grigorievich Dzeranov
Minister of Agriculture and Food	Dzhambolat Iosivovich Kozaev
Minister of Education and Science	Anatoly Georgievich Kusraev
Minister of Culture	Tamerlan Efimovich Dzudtsov
Minister of Press and Mass Communications	Irina Yureva Gagloeva

Source: (source removed)

Political offices
Preceded by Boris Chochiev; Acting	Prime Minister of South Ossetia; 2008–2009	Succeeded by Vadim Brovtsev
