= Irina Yanovskaya =

Georgian journalist and human rights activist

- ირინა იანოვსკაია
- Born: Tbilisi, Georgia
- Education: Tbilisi Faculty of Computer Sciences; South Ossetian State University
- Occupations: Journalist, human rights and peace activist and children's advocate
- Employer(s): BGI; Internews
- Organization(s): Journalists for Human Rights; Caucasus Network on Conflict Resolution; War Child

Irina Yanovskaya (née Kumaritova, Georgian: ირინა იანოვსკაია) is a Georgian journalist, human rights and peace activist and children's advocate. She founded and is the chair of the non-governmental organisation Journalists for Human Rights and is a member of the Caucasus Network on Conflict Resolution.

== Biography ==
Yanovskaya is a Georgian journalist of Ossetian and Russian heritage. She studied at the Tbilisi Faculty of Computer Sciences, graduating in 1984, and married a Russian man.

Yanovskaya began her career in journalism for the news service BGI, then worked for Internews. She founded and is the chair of the non-governmental organisation Journalists for Human Rights (JHR), established in 1998.

In the Georgia-South Ossetia conflict zone in the South Caucasus, Yanovskaya established the project "Developing the peace-making potential of Georgian and Ossetian women in South Ossetia" with funding from the United Nations Development Programme's (UNDP) Confidence Building and Early Response Mechanism. The project facilitated ethnically mixed discussion groups between Georgian and Ossetian women and training sessions. Yanovskaya has campaigned for restitution laws for internally displaced persons (IDP) during the conflict, including her own parents who were forced from their apartment in Tbilisi, and for protection under South Ossetian law for women subjected to domestic violence.

Yanovskaya also works with War Child in the Netherlands and has established summer camps for Georgian and Ossetian children. She published a calendar with photographs of children and war to raise awareness of the impact of the Georgian–Ossetian conflict on children.

In 2005, Yanovskaya was named a Nobel Peace Prize 1000 PeaceWomen Across the Globe (PWAG). That year, she also entered a one-year law programme at the South Ossetian State University (Iron Ossetic: Хуссар Ирыстоны паддзахадон университет, Georgian: სამხრეთ ოსეთის პედაგოგიური ინსტიტუტი). She was named a Woman PeaceMaker in 2007.

Yanovskaya continued to work as a journalist during the 2008 Russo-Georgian War. In 2014, she contributed to Vamik Volkan's book Enemies on the Couch, A Psychopolitical Journey Through War and Peace.
