= Erik Pukhayev =

South Ossetian politician

- Пухайты Эрик (Iron Ossetic); Эрик Пухаев (Russian)

14th Prime Minister of South Ossetia
- In office 16 May 2017 – 29 August 2020
- President: Anatoliy Bibilov
- Preceded by: Domenty Kulumbegov
- Succeeded by: Gennady Bekoyev

Personal details
- Born: 5 May 1957 (age 69) Skhlit, South Ossetian AO, Georgian SSR, Soviet Union

Erik Georgiyevich Pukhayev (Russian: Эрик Георгиевич Пухаев, Iron Ossetic: Пухайты Георгийи фырт Эрик, romanized: Puxajty Georgiji fyrt Erik; born 5 May 1957) was the Prime Minister of South Ossetia from 2017 to 2020.

He studied at South Ossetian Pedagogical Institute from 1977 to 1982 and became Maths and Physics teacher. In 2005 he was nominated as director of Statistical Institute. From 2014 to 2017 he served as Vice-Prime Minister.

He is married and has 3 children.

Pukhayev resigned from the post of Prime Minister on August 29, during the crisis following the Murder of Inal Djabiev, where a suspect in police custody was tortured to death, resulting in thousand strong protests in Tskhinvali.

Political offices
Preceded by Domenty Kulumbegov	Prime Minister of South Ossetia; 2017–2020	Succeeded by Gennady Bekoyev
