= Kosta Dzugaev =

South Ossetian politician

Kosta Georgievich Dzugaev (Russian: Коста Георгиевич Дзугаев; born 24 April 1956) is a South Ossetian politician, who is a former chairman (speaker) of the Parliament of South Ossetia.

Dzugaev was born in Tskhinvali in 1956. His father was the late writer Georgij Hasakoevich Dzugaev; his mother is Fatima Alihanovna Kaloeva. Dzugaev studied physics and mathematics at the South Ossetian State University, and was also a keen piano player, which he studied at the Tskhinvali School of Music. After graduating there, he was recommended for a continuation of his piano studies at the Moscow Conservatory, which he did not attend, however.

From 1980 to 1982, Dzugaev served in the Soviet Army, as an artillery officer in the Transbaikal Military District. After this, he became a teacher at the South Ossetian State University. He obtained a PhD at the Kyiv University.

Dzugaev entered politics in 1989. He was elected into parliament in the 1994 election, where he led the committee on legislation, law and human rights. In 1996, after South Ossetia created the office of a president, Dzugaev was elected as the replacement of Lyudvig Chibirov. From 1999 until 2001, Dzugaev was head of the State Committee on Press and Mass Communications.

Kosta Dzugaev is currently an advisor to president Eduard Kokoity.

Preceded by Lyudvig Chibirov	Chairman of the Parliament of South Ossetia; 1996 - 1999	Succeeded by Stanislav Kochiev
