= Boris Chochiyev =

South Ossetian politician (1957–2021)

Boris Yeliozovich Chochiyev
- Цоциты Барис (Iron Ossetic); Борис Чочиев (Russian)

Prime Minister of South Ossetia
- In office 18 August 2008 – 22 October 2008
- President: Eduard Kokoity
- Preceded by: Yury Morozov
- Succeeded by: Aslanbek Bulatsev

Personal details
- Born: 1 November 1957
- Died: 22 July 2021 (aged 63) Vladikavkaz, Russia

Boris Yeliozovich Chochiyev (Russian: Борис Елиозович Чочиев; Iron Ossetic: Цоциты Елиозы фырт Барис, romanized: Cocity Eliozy fyrt Baris; 1 November 1957 – 22 July 2021) was a South Ossetian politician who briefly served as Prime Minister in 2008.

== Biography ==
Chochiev became prime minister on 18 August 2008, after South Ossetian President Eduard Kokoity had dismissed the former government and proclaimed a state of emergency. On 22 October 2008, the South Ossetian parliament appointed Aslanbek Bulatsev as new prime minister.

Before becoming prime minister, Chochiev served as first deputy minister, as well chief negotiator for the South Ossetian secessionist government. Chochiev was also a member of the Joint Control Commission.

== Death ==
Chochiev died from COVID-19 on 22 July 2021, in Vladikavkaz. He was 63 years old.

Political offices
| Preceded by Yury Morozov | Prime Minister of South Ossetia; 2008 | Succeeded by Aslanbek Bulatsev |
