= Iron (political party, 2023) =

South Ossetian Political parties

Republican Socialist Party "Iron" Республикон социалистон парти «Ирон»
- Russian name: Республиканская социалистическая партия «Ирон»
- Leader: Georgiy Kabisov
- Founder: Georgiy Kabisov
- Founded: 8 April 2023
- Ideology: Democratic socialism; Soviet patriotism; Ossetian nationalism; Anti-establishment; Reformism; Russophilia
- Political position: Left-wing to far-left
- Parliament: 0 / 34

Iron (Iron Ossetic: Ирон), officially, the Republican Socialist Party "Iron" (Iron Ossetic: Республикон социалистон парти «Ирон») is a political party in the small Caucasian republic of South Ossetia, formed after the release of Georgiy Kabisov from prison. Kabisov, a vocal pro-Russian politician who was arrested on the charge of running an espionage ring to gather blackmail on members of the South Ossetian parliament, announced that he was going to be creating a political party named Iron, in reference to an earlier 2010 party of the same name, which in turn is a reference to the Iron dialect of Ossetian, as a new South Ossetian opposition party.

== History ==
The party held its founding congress on April 8, 2023, the 22nd anniversary of the adoption of South Ossetia's common law. The party's organizing committee is headed by Zhanna Kochieva, a former member of parliament for United Ossetia and consists of 17 former high-ranking politicians including Yuri Dziztsoity and Georgiy Kabisov. Kabisov announced that his party is seeking the vote of supporters of former President of South Ossetia Eduard Kokoity, entering a crowded field as the People's Party, and another new party, For Justice, are also competing for the pro-Kokoity vote. The party claims to follow socialist principles, and intends to build South Ossetia into a socialist state. The party has also broken from the pro-Russian strain common in all South Ossetian parties, stating that the South Ossetian state must stop waiting for directions from Russia, and that a large portion of the party's organizers are those who led the protests after the Murder of Inal Djabiev.

On April 20, 2023, the party released its manifesto, stating that the party would be based on "traditional Ossetian spiritual and moral values" and will focus on the "construction of a modern state with effective management." The party called for the unification with North Ossetia, and for a strong alliance with Russia, albeit, as a "partner" and equal in a Union State, as opposed to being a Russian subject. The party also described the 1920 and 2008 wars with Georgia as "genocides" of the Ossetian people. The party also stated they would attempt to end South Ossetia's international isolation by applying to join international organizations. Economically the party has centered around increasing the agricultural sector, building housing, and increasing the pension for the elderly as well as providing a cash "bonus" to families per child, as well as mandatory employment. On May 26, 2023, Kabisov, as party chairman, gave an interview to Radio Free Europe praising incumbent President Alan Gagloev for deweaponizing the judicial system and ending the "arbitrariness" in enforcing laws.

=== 2024 election ===
The party sought to stand seven candidates in the 2024 election. However, shortly before the election, the Central Election Commission (CEC) disqualified Iron due to two candidates, Kabisov and Igor Kudziyev, being felons, passing a threshold of more than 25% of candidates being felons. Kabisov disputed the ruling, stating that the two CEC officials that determined his party's legality where an expert on ballistics and road accidents respectively, and had no cause to be members of the CEC, or issuing binding statements on the legality of political parties. Kabisov stated that he would appeal the decision to the courts, stating that since he was the face of the party he should be exempt from the law against felons holding office. However, the ruling was not overturned and the party did not participate in the election.
