= Rostislav Khugayev =

South Ossetian politician

- Хугаты Ростик (Iron Ossetic); Ростислав Хугаев (Russian)
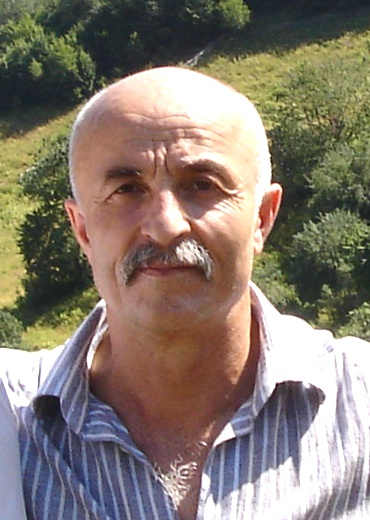
- Khugayev in 2007

Prime Minister of South Ossetia
- In office 15 May 2012 – 20 January 2014; Acting: 26 April – 15 May 2012
- President: Leonid Tibilov
- Preceded by: Vadim Brovtsev
- Succeeded by: Domenty Kulumbegov (Acting)

Personal details
- Born: 17 December 1951 (age 74) Mirtgadzhin, South Ossetian AO, Georgian SSR, Soviet Union
- Party: Independent

Rostislav Erastovich Khugayev (Iron Ossetic: Хугаты Ерасты фырт Ростик, romanized: Xugatê Érastê fêrt Roštik, Russian: Ростислав Ерастович Хугаев; born 17 December 1951) was the Prime Minister of South Ossetia from 26 April 2012 to 20 January 2014.

Khugayev was born in Mirtgadzhin in Dzau district in the South Ossetian Autonomous Oblast.

== Cabinet ==
Office	Incumbent
Prime Minister	Rostislav Erastovich Khugayev
First Deputy Prime Minister of the Government	Domenti Sardionovich Kulumbegov
Deputy Prime Minister	Alla Aleksandrovna Dzhioyeva
Deputy Prime Minister	Guram Mikhailovich Melkoyev
Minister of Foreign Affairs	David Georgievich Sanakoyev
Minister of Defence	Valeriy Adamovich Yakhnovets
Minister of Internal Affairs	Akhsar Endrikovich Lavoyev
Minister of Justice	Murat Vladimirovich Vanayev
Minister for Civil Defense, Emergencies and Disaster Management	Anatoly Ilich Bibilov
Minister of Finance	Aza Konstantinovna Habalova
Minister of Economic Development	Zalina Yuryevna Hugati
Minister of Education and Science	Marina Lyudvigovna Chibirova
Minister of Culture	Maharbeg Rutenovich Kokoyev
Minister of Health and Social Development	Grigory Stepanovich Kulidzhanov
Minister of Agriculture	Mairbeg Vladimirovich Guchmazov
Minister of Construction, Architecture, Housing and Utilities	Eduard Nikolayevich Dzagoev

Political offices
Preceded by Vadim Brovtsev	Prime Minister of South Ossetia; 2012–2014	Succeeded by Domenty Kulumbegov; Acting
