= 1994 South Ossetian parliamentary election =

- March 1994
- 36 seats in the Parliament; 19 seats needed for a majority
| Party | Leader | Vote % | Seats |
|---|---|---|---|
| HIKP | Stanislav Kochiev | 47.2 | 19 |
| Independents | Gerasim Khugayev | 52.8 | 17 |
This lists parties that won seats. See the complete results below.
| Prime Minister before | Prime Minister after |
|---|---|
| Gerasim Khugayev; Independent | Feliks Zassiev; Independent |

Parliamentary elections were held in South Ossetia in March 1994. They were the first and only elections to the State Nykhas, (Note: The Parliament of South Ossetia was known as the State Nykhas, or Council of Elders, from 1993 to 1996 before being renamed to the Parliament. Prior to being the State Nykhas, the legislature was known as the Supreme Soviet of South Ossetia from 1991 to 1993, which also operated since 1927 when South Ossetia was part of the Soviet Union) the legislature of the partially recognized South Caucasian territory which most of the United Nations recognised as part of Georgia under illegal occupation by Russian forces. The elections were the first since the South Ossetian war from 1991 to 1992.

== Background ==
South Ossetia in the 1990s has been described by pundits and journalists as a "land forgotten by time" clinging to the Soviet Union and the practice of communism despite the wider region abandoning the political system. Since South Ossetia's de facto independence in 1991 during the South Ossetia War the dominant political party was the Communist Party of South Ossetia which supported a staunch preservation of the Soviet way of life. The other political faction consisted of independent members of the South Ossetian Supreme Soviet who abandoned the Communist Party to focus on domestic issues and Ossetian nationalism.

In September 1993 Ludvig Chibirov, a colleague of North Ossetian leader Akhsarbek Galazov, was elected head of state. The initial constitution of South Ossetia did not have a formal head of state position, with the head of state instead being the Chairman of the South Ossetian Supreme Soviet. Chibirov, an independent, changed the name of the Supreme Soviet to the State Nykhas (Council of Elders), with the first elections to the newly renamed body being held in March 1994.

== Results ==
The elections saw the Communist Party win 19 of the 36 seats with 47.2% of the vote, with the remaining seats being won by independents.

| Party | Votes | % | Seats |
|---|---|---|---|
| Communist Party of South Ossetia | | 47.2 | 19 |
| Independents | | 52.8 | 17 |
| Total | | | 36 |

== Aftermath ==
Despite Chibirov's independents not securing a majority, he would be re-elected to his Chairmanship and one of his first actions was welcoming the Georgian-Russian peacekeeping force, the Joint Peacekeeping Force (JPKF) to occupy South Ossetia.
