= Georgiy Kabisov =

South Ossetian politician

Chairman of the State Committee of Information, Communication and Mass Media
- President: Eduard Kokoity

Personal details
- Born: 22 January 1973 (age 53)
- Party: Independent (Until 2022); Iron (Since 2022)
- Spouse: Zarina Kabisova
- Occupation: Politician

Georgiy Sergeyevich Kabisov (Iron Ossetic: Къæбысты Георгий; Russian: Георгий Сергеевич Кабисов, born 22 January 1973) is an Ossetian politician from the partially recognized Caucasus Republic of South Ossetia.

== Biography ==
=== Chairman ===
As chairman of the State Committee of Information, Communication and Mass Media on 6 August 2011, Kabisov denounced the movie 5 Days of War as "Hitler propaganda" and claimed that the United States are the "patrons" of Nazis. He also stated that Georgia and Mikheil Saakashvili where "spiteful aggressors" in the Russo-Georgian War.

=== 2011 election ===
Kabisov would run as a candidate for the 2011 South Ossetian presidential election as an independent. Kabisov was considered the frontrunner as the pro-Russian candidate, however, he would win just 7.5% of the vote in the first round, and be eliminated from the run-off.

=== 2012 election ===
Kabisov attempted to run for president again in the 2012 South Ossetian presidential election, however, the Central Election Commission denied his candidacy twice.

=== Arrest ===
In 2017 Kabisov was arrested on charges of committing economic crimes, abuse of office, and illegal acquisition and possession of weapons and was sentenced to eight years in prison. Kabisov called the arrest politically motivated and a stunt by Anatoly Bibilov to quash opposition. General Prosecutor Uruzmag Jagayev, announced that "special equipment" was found in Kabisov's home, and that he was collecting blackmail information on politicians. Kabisov's family insisted that all the "special equipment" was store bought and is readily available throughout Russia. Zarina Kabisova, Georgiy's wife, insisted that his arrest was retaliation for founding a telecommunications company in North Ossetia called Elektrosvyaz, which was supposed to be the name of a new South Ossetian state telecommunications company. While in prison Georgiy went on an unsuccessful hunger strike. Additionally, his family and close supporters worked with Alan Gagloev on his successful 2022 bid for president, with Kabisov being pardoned and released in June 2022.

=== Iron ===
Shortly out of prison, Kabisov attempted to launch a political comeback, namely by beginning the groundwork to form his own political party named Iron in 2022, hoping to be a successor of an earlier anti-Russian party of the same name which was denied registration in 2010.

Iron's first congress was held on 8 April 2023, the 22nd anniversary of the adoption of South Ossetia's common law. The party's organizing committee was headed by Zhanna Kochieva, a former member of parliament for United Ossetia and consists of 17 former high-ranking politicians including Yuri Dziztsoity. The party claims to follow socialist principles, and intends to build South Ossetia into a socialist state.
