= 2017 South Ossetian name change referendum =

- 9 April 2017
- Do you agree with the amendment of part 1 of article 1 of the Constitution of the Republic of South Ossetia, setting it out as follows: The Republic of South Ossetia - the State of Alania - is a sovereign democratic legal state created as a result of the self-determination of the people of the Republic of South Ossetia. Names Republic South Ossetia and the State of Alania are equivalent.

Results
Choice	Votes	%
Yes	25,123	79.53%
No	6,466	20.47%
Valid votes	31,589	94.49%
Invalid or blank votes	1,842	5.51%
Total votes	33,431	100.00%
Registered voters/turnout	41,814	79.95%

A referendum on changing the territory's name was held in South Ossetia on 9 April 2017, alongside presidential elections. It was approved by 79.53%. The constitution will be amended to denominate the formal name of the country from "Republic of South Ossetia" to "Republic of South Ossetia–the State of Alania", referencing Alania, a state built by the Alan people. Modern Ossetians are descended from the Alans, although the name Ossetian is of Georgian origin (although the Georgian root word ოსი is itself from an Alanic autonym).

== Background ==
In a move towards integration with the Russian Federation, South Ossetian President Leonid Tibilov proposed in December 2015 a name change to "South Ossetia–Alania", in analogy with "North Ossetia–Alania", a Russian federal subject. Tibilov furthermore suggested holding a referendum on joining the Russian Federation prior to April 2017, which would lead to a united "Ossetia–Alania". In April 2016, Tibilov said he intended to hold the referendum before August of that year. However, on 30 May, Tibilov postponed the referendum until after the presidential election due in April 2017.

== Results ==
Choice	Votes	%
For	25,123	79.53
Against	6,466	20.47
Total	31,589	100.00
Valid votes	31,589	94.49
Invalid/blank votes	1,842	5.51
Total votes	33,431	100.00
Registered voters/turnout	41,814	79.95
Source: South Osetia
