= Communist Party of South Ossetia =

Communist Party of South Ossetia Хуссар Ирыстоны Коммунистон парти
- Leader: Stanislav Kochiev
- Founder: Stanislav Kochiev
- Founded: 16 April 1993
- Preceded by: South Ossetian Regional Committee of the Communist Party of Georgia
- Headquarters: Tskhinvali
- Membership (2004): 1,500
- Ideology: Communism; Marxism–Leninism; Left-conservatism; Soviet patriotism
- Political position: Far-left
- Continental affiliation: UCP–CPSU
- Parliament: 3 / 34 (9%)

Website
- kpruo.tw1.ru

The Communist Party of the Republic of South Ossetia (Iron Ossetic: Республикаӕ Хуссар Ирыстоны Коммунистон парти, romanized: Respublikæ Hussar Irystony Kommuniston parti; Georgian: სამხრეთ ოსეთის კომუნისტური პარტია, romanized: samkhret osetis k'omunist'uri p'art'ia; Russian: Коммунистическая партия Республики Южная Осетия) is a Marxist-Leninist party in South Ossetia. The party was founded in 1993. As of 2004, the party claimed a membership of 1,500. The party seeks recognition of the Republic of South Ossetia, which is internationally recognized by most countries as a part of Georgia.

CPSO is led by Stanislav Kochiev, who is also chairman and speaker of the South Ossetian Parliament. Yulia Tekhova is the deputy secretary of the party.

The party is affiliated to the Union of Communist Parties-Communist Party of the Soviet Union.

== History ==
On 16 April 1993, the founding and restoration congress of the Communist Party of the Republic of South Ossetia was held, where more than 40 primary organizations were restored. The Central Executive Committee and the Audit Commission were elected. Stanislav Kochiev was elected Chairman of the CEC, and Alveri Kochiev was elected as the Deputy. The party then numbered 3 thousand people.

=== 1994 parliamentary election ===
In the March 1994 election, the party got 19 out of 36 seats.. Overall, the party obtained 47.2% of the popular vote.

=== 1999 parliamentary election ===
In the May 1999 election, the party received over 80% of the popular vote and won 27 seats out of 29 contested seats in parliament. Their leader, Stanislav Kochiev, would be elected speaker of parliament with 22 votes, however, one of the two independents was named the prime minister to independent president Lyudvig Chibirov. Their massive success in the election is attributed to a rumor that Chibirov was negotiating a re-annexation into Georgia in an attempt to recreate an entity like the South Ossetian Autonomous Oblast. Despite their massive electoral success, the party was unable to force Chibirov to resign.

=== 2001 presidential election ===
The party and Kochiev would again challenge Chibirov in the 2001 South Ossetian presidential election this time succeeding in removing him from office as Chibirov lost in the first round with less than 20% of the popular vote. However, the party would lose against another independent candidate, Eduard Kokoity, who received 57.46% of the vote, while Kochiev and the communists only gained 42.54% of the vote. This was the effective high water mark of the party as they were never again serious contenders for leadership.

=== After 2001 ===
The party stood no candidates in the 2006 South Ossetian presidential election and the 2011 South Ossetian presidential election instead supporting Kokoity. Kochiev would make another bid for the presidency in the 2012 South Ossetian presidential election, receiving only 5.42% of the vote and coming in a distant fourth place. The party again stood no candidate in the 2017 South Ossetian presidential election and their candidate in the 2022 South Ossetian presidential election, Taymuraz Tadtayev, a professor at the South Ossetian State University, was disqualified before the first round.

The party has seen moderately more success in parliamentary elections. in the 2004 South Ossetian parliamentary election they won 4 seats with 27.4% of the popular vote. In the 2009 South Ossetian parliamentary election they received 22.80% of the popular vote and 8 seats in parliament. However, in the 2014 South Ossetian parliamentary election, the party lost all their seats and only received 4.41% of the vote. This would be the first time that the party had no representation in government. Due to election law requiring every party that won no seats be de-registered, the party was technically disbanded following the election and then re-founded in June of 2015. The party was able to win 2 seats in parliament in the 2019 South Ossetian parliamentary election after receiving 7.29% of the vote.

== Leadership ==
=== 1st rendition ===
When the party was founded in 1993 the official name of its leader was the "First Secretary of the Central Committee of the Communist Party of South Ossetia". Of which only Kochiev would hold the office.

Year	Name	Period	Time in office
1993	Stanislav Kochiev	1993–2014	21 years

=== 2nd rendition ===
Following the party's defeat in 2014 and exit from parliament, as per election laws of the time, the party was technically disbanded until it was reestablished in 2015 under the same name, leadership and membership. However, after this re-foundation the name of its leader was changed to "Chairman of the Central Committee of the Communist Party" with Kochiev holding the office.

Year	Name	Period	Time in office
2015	Stanislav Kochiev	2015 –	10–11 years

== Election results ==
=== Parliament ===
Election	Votes	%	Seats	+/–	Status
1994	(1st)	47.2%	19 / 36	▲	Opposition
1999	(1st)		27 / 33	▲8	Opposition
2004	(2nd)	27.4	4 / 34	▼23	Opposition
2009	10,194 (3rd)	22.22	8 / 34	▲4	Opposition
2014	890 (7th)	4.39	0 / 34	▼8	Extra-parliamentary
2019	1,622 (5th)	7.29	2 / 34	▲2	Opposition
2024	1,557 (4th)	7.12	3 / 34	▲1	Opposition
