= Prime Minister of South Ossetia =

Head of government of the de facto independent republic

Prime Minister of the Republic of South Ossetia
- Coat of arms of South Ossetia
- Incumbent; Soslan Margiev since 22 October 2026
- Type: Head of government
- Residence: Tskhinvali
- Nominator: President of South Ossetia
- Appointer: Parliament of South Ossetia
- Inaugural holder: Oleg Teziev
- Formation: 28 November 1991; 34 years ago

The Prime Minister of the Republic of South Ossetia, officially known as the Chairman of the Government (Russian: Председатель Правительства), is the head of government of the partially recognized Republic of South Ossetia that is de jure part of Georgia. This is a list of the de facto prime ministers of the Republic of South Ossetia.

== Chairman of the Council of People's Commissars ==
- Razden Shamelovich Kozayev Apr 1922 - 1922

=== List of First Secretaries of the Communist Party of South Ossetia ===
Name	Term of Office		Life years
Name	Start	End	Life years
Chairman of the Organization Bureau
Vladimir Sanakoyev	June 1918	July 30, 1918	1884–1937
Chairman of the Regional Committee of the Communist Party
Vladimir Sanakoyev	July 30, 1918	1920	1884–1937
First Secretaries of the Regional Committee of the Communist Party
Sergey Gagloyev	1921	1921	1896–1938
Vladimir Sanakoyev	1921	April 22, 1924	1884–1937
Aleksandr Dzhatiyev	1924	?	1891–1937
Sergey Kudryavtsev	1929	1930?	1903–1938
Isaak Zhvaniya	1932	1934?	?–1937
Boris (Abdul-Bekir) Tautiyev	1936?	1937	?–1937
Georgiy Gochashvili	1937	1938	1904–?
Vladimir Tskhovrebashvili	February 1938	January 1949	1905–1977
Akaky Imnadze	January 1949	May 1953	1908–?
Ivan Kudzhiashvili	May 1953	1954	1906–?
Grigory Sanakoyev	1954	1959	1914–?
Vladimir Kozayev	1959	1962	1917–?
Iosif Chiayev	1962	February 1965	1907–?
Georgy Dzhussoyev	February 1965	November 1973	1926–
Feliks Sanakoyev	November 1973	April 1988	1939–
Anatoly Chekhoyev	April 1988	January 1990	1950–
Valnin Tskhovrebashvili	January 1990	February 1991	1933–
Znaur Gassiyev	February 1991	August 1991	1925–

== List ==
Chairman of the South Ossetian People's Council

*1 Jun 1918 - May 1919     Aleksandr Arsenyevich Tibilov      (b. 1887 - d. 1937)  PSR

Chairmen of the Revolutionary Committee

- 23 Mar 1920 - 23 Jun 1920 Vladimir Davidovich Abayev (b. 1886 - d. 1964) RKP

                           (underground to May 1920, in rebellion at Roka 8 May – 7 Jun 1920)

- 25 Feb 1921 - Apr 1921 Vladimir Arzhevanovich Sanakoyev (s.a.) KPS-B

                           (in exile at Vladikavkaz, Soviet Russia to Mar 1921)

- Apr 1921 - 22 Apr 1922 Aleksandr Mikhaylovich Dzhatiyev (s.a.) KPS-B

Chairmen of the Central Executive Committee

- 22 Apr 1922 - 1924 Aleksandr Mikhaylovich Dzhatiyev (s.a.) KPS-B

                            (1st time)

- 1924 - 1928 Tasoltan (Vissarion) Bekuzarov KPS-B
- 1928 - Dec 1929 Aleksandr Mikhaylovich Dzhatiyev (s.a.) KPS-B

                            (2nd time)

- bf.1936 - 1937 Ivan Petrovich Dzhidzhoyev (b. 1904 - d. 1937) KPS-B
- 1937 - 1938 Vladimir Ivanovich Khubayev (b. 1905 - d.af.1946)KPS-B

Chairmen of the Executive Committee of the Soviet of People's Deputies

- 1938 - 1943 Vladimir Ivanovich Khubayev (s.a.) KPS-B
- Jul 1943 - 13 Apr 1948 Aleksandr Georgiyevich Galavanov (b. 1902 - d. 1986) KPS-B
- 13 Apr 1948 - 1953 Ilya Davidovich Kulukhov (b. 1901 - d.af.1961)KPS-B;1952 KPS
- 1953 - 1954 Grigoriy Georgiyevich Sanakoyev (s.a.) KPS
- 1954 - 1956 Vladimir Dmitriyevich Kozayev (s.a.) KPS
- 1956 - 1957 Iosif Semyonovich Chiayev (s.a.) KPS
- 1957 - 1959 Semyon Grigoryevich Tibilov (b. 1900 - d. 19..) KPS
- Dec 1959 - 196. V.G. Sanakoyev KPS
- 1961 - 1964 Vladimir Isaakovich Gazzayev (b. 1918 - d. 2008) KPS
- 1964 - Feb 1965 Georgiy Nikolayevich Dzhussoyev (s.a.) KPS
- Feb 1965 - 1972 Kosta Kargoyevich Dzhioyev (b. 1916 - d. 2005) KPS
- 1972 - Nov 1973 Feliks Sergeyevich Sanakoyev (s.a.) KPS
- Nov 1973 - Nov 1981 Genrikh Irakliyevich Mardanov (b. 1933) KPS
- Nov 1981 - May 1986 Tamara Shalvovna Kabulova (f) (b. 1938 - d. 2023) KPS
- May 1986 - 20 Sep 1990 Anatoliy Abramovich Kachmazov KPS
- 20 Sep 1990 – 16 Oct 1990 Feliks Mikhaylovich Zasseyev (b. 1945 - d. 2021) KPS

Chairman of the (to 28 Nov 1990, Provisional) Executive Committee

- 16 Oct 1990 – 10 Dec 1990 Torez Georgiyevich Kulumbegov (b. 1938 – d. 2006)

== List of officeholders ==
No.	Portrait	Name (Birth–Death)	Term of office			Political party	President
No.	Portrait	Name (Birth–Death)	Took office	Left office	Time in office	Political party	President
1		Oleg Teziyev (born 1948)	28 November 1991	October 1993	1 year, 10 months	Independent	None
2		Gerasim Khugayev (1945–2024)	October 1993	May 1994	7 months	Independent	None
3		Feliks Zasseev (1945–2021)	May 1994	1995	c. 1 year	Independent	None
4		Vladislav Gabarayev (born 1959)	1995	24 September 1996	c. 1 year	Independent	None
—		Valeriy Hubulov (1966–1998); Acting Prime Minister	25 September 1996	2 December 1996	68 days	Independent	None
5		Aleksandr Shavlokhov (1940–2026)	2 December 1996	August 1998	1 year, 7 months	Independent	Lyudvig Chibirov (1996–2001)
6		Merab Chigoyev (1950–2016)	August 1998	6 June 2001	2 years, 10 months	Independent	Lyudvig Chibirov (1996–2001)
7		Dmitry Sanakoyev (born 1969)	14 June 2001	December 2001	5 months	Independent	Lyudvig Chibirov (1996–2001)
(2)		Gerasim Khugayev (1945–2024)	December 2001	August 2003	1 year, 8 months	Unity Party	Eduard Kokoity (2001–2011)
8		Igor Sanakoyev (born 1946)	17 September 2003	May 2005	1 year, 7 months	Unity Party	Eduard Kokoity (2001–2011)
—		Zurab Kokoyev (born 1959); Acting Prime Minister	May 2005	5 July 2005	2 months	Unity Party	Eduard Kokoity (2001–2011)
9		Yury Morozov (born 1949)	5 July 2005	17 August 2008	3 years, 43 days	Unity Party	Eduard Kokoity (2001–2011)
—		Boris Chochiyev (1957–2021); Acting Prime Minister	17 August 2008	22 October 2008	66 days	Unity Party	Eduard Kokoity (2001–2011)
10		Aslanbek Bulatsev (born 1964)	22 October 2008	4 August 2009	286 days	Unity Party	Eduard Kokoity (2001–2011)
11		Vadim Brovtsev (1969–2024)	5 August 2009	26 April 2012	2 years, 266 days	Unity Party	Eduard Kokoity (2001–2011)
12		Rostik Khugayev (born 1951)	26 April 2012	20 January 2014	1 year, 269 days	Independent	Leonid Tibilov (2012–2017)
13		Domenty Kulumbegov (born 1956)	20 January 2014	16 May 2017	3 years, 116 days	Independent	Leonid Tibilov (2012–2017)
14		Erik Pukhayev (born 1957)	16 May 2017	29 August 2020	3 years, 105 days	United Ossetia	Anatoly Bibilov (2017–2022)
15		Gennady Bekoyev (born 1981)	29 August 2020	20 June 2022	1 year, 295 days	United Ossetia	Anatoly Bibilov (2017–2022)
16		Konstantin Dzhussoev (born 1967)	20 June 2022	21 January 2026	3 years, 215 days	Independent	Alan Gagloev (2022–2026)
17		Dzambolyt Tadtayev (born 1990)	21 January 2026	8 June 2026	138 days	Independent	Alan Gagloev (2022–2026)
—		Konstantin Dzhioyev (born 1989); Acting Prime Minister	8 June 2026	16 June 2026	8 days	Independent	Alan Gagloev (2022–2026)
18		Marat Kambolov (born 1965)	16 June 2026	30 September 2026	106 days	Independent	Marat Kambolov (2026–present)
19		Soslan Margiev	22 October 2026	Incumbent	9 days	Independent	Marat Kambolov (2026–present)

=== Chairman of the Government (Prime minister) ===
- Uruzmag Karkusov 7 Dec 2006 - Sep 2007

== See also ==
- President of South Ossetia

== Sources ==
- (in Russian) Rulers of South Ossetia
- Rulers.org: South Ossetia
- (in Russian) Osinform: Thirteen South Ossetian PMs (2 November 2008)
