= Zurab Kokoyev =

Russian politician

- Зураб Кокоев
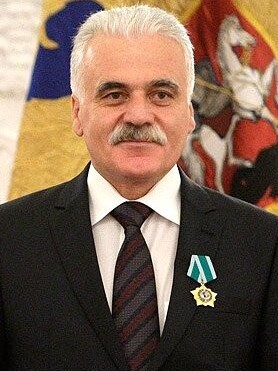
- Kokoyev in 2010

Prime Minister of South Ossetia
- In office May 2005 – 5 July 2005
- President: Eduard Kokoity
- Preceded by: Igor Sanakoyev
- Succeeded by: Yury Morozov

Personal details
- Born: 14 February 1959 (age 67) Tskhinvali, South Ossetian AO, Georgian SSR, Soviet Union
- Party: Unity
- Children: 1

Zurab Revazovich Kokoyev (Russian: Зураб Ревазович Кокоев; born 14 February 1959) is a South Ossetian politician and was a member of South Ossetia's parliament, where he was one of three vice-speakers, and Chairman of the Committee for construction, industry, transport and communications. He is the leader of the Unity Party, which is allied with former President of South Ossetia Eduard Kokoity.

Kokoyev was first deputy prime minister from October 2003 until 31 December 2005 and acting Prime Minister from May until July 2005. Before this, he was head of the administration of Tskhinvali district since 2002.

Kokoyev is married and has a daughter.

Political offices
Preceded by Igor Sanakoyev	Prime Minister of South Ossetia; 2005	Succeeded by Yury Morozov
Preceded by Stanislav Kochiev	Acting Chairman of the Parliament of South Ossetia; 2011–2012	Succeeded by Stanislav Kochiev
