= OSInform Information Agency =

OSinform Information Agency
- Formation: May 2006
- Type: Non-profit organization
- Purpose: Provides news coverage of events in South Ossetia and North Ossetia
- Location: Tskhinvali, South Ossetia
- Official language: Russian
- Parent organization: South Ossetian Television and Radio Broadcasting Company "IR"
- Website: closed

OSinform Information Agency (Russian: ОСинформ Информационное Агентство) is a South Ossetian news agency. It provides news coverage of political, economic, social, cultural, and sports events in South Ossetia and North Ossetia.

OSInform was founded by South Ossetian Television and Radio Broadcasting Company "IR" that is operated by South Ossetian State Committee for TV and Radio Broadcasting.
