= South Ossetian State University =

South Ossetia State University
- Хуссар Ирыстоны паддзахадон университет (Ossetian), სამხრეთ ოსეთის პედაგოგიური ინსტიტუტი (Georgian), Юго-Осетинский государственный университет (Russian)
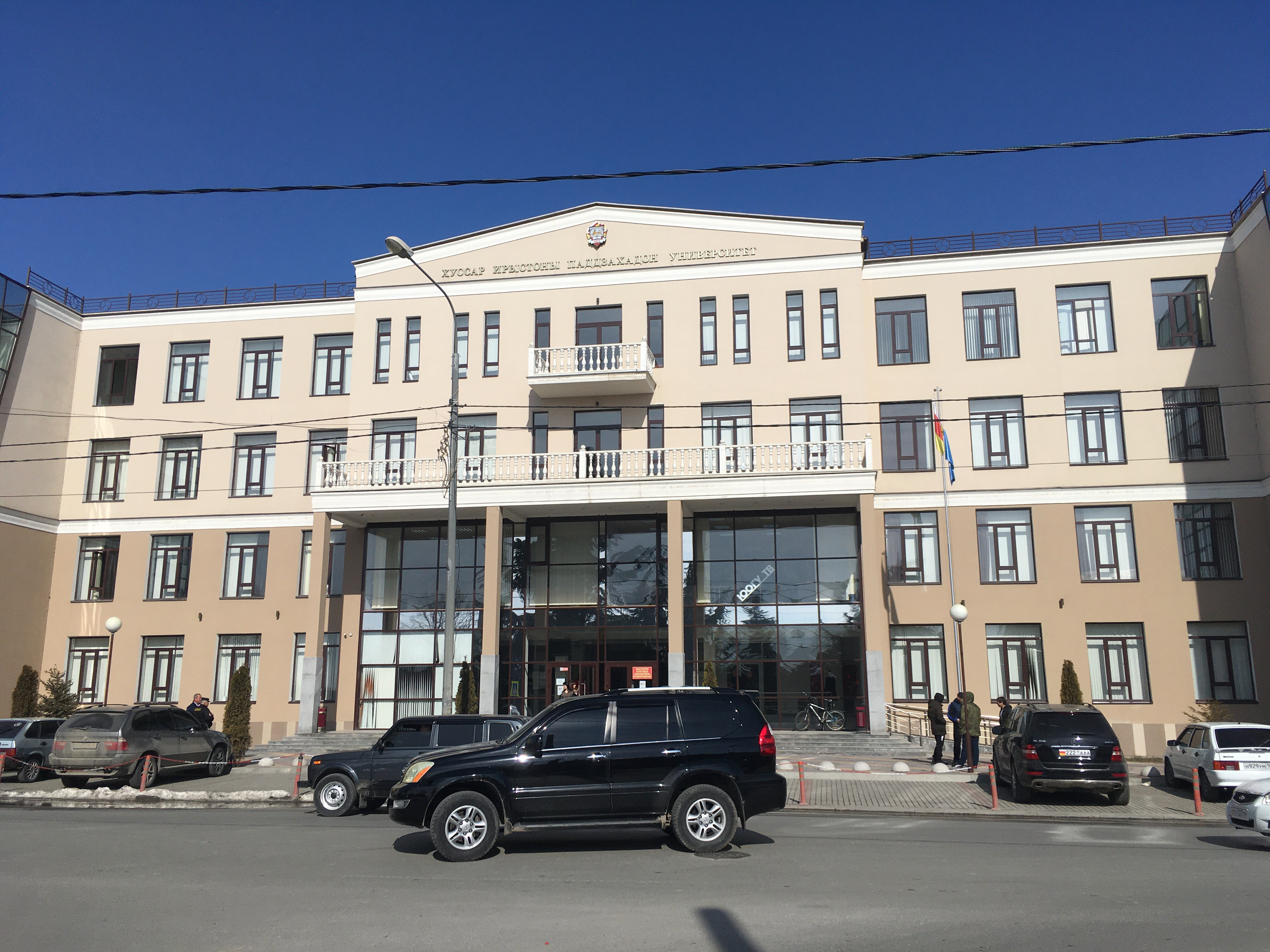
- Other names: Alexander Tibilov State University
- Former names: Stalinirsky Agricultural Institute, South Ossetian Pedagogical Institute
- Type: Private
- Established: January 1, 1932
- Founders: Alexander Razhenovich Khubov (Soviet institute), Leonid Tibilov (Current university)
- Rector: Vadim Tedeev Botazovich
- Students: ≈3,000
- Location: Путина (бывшая ул. Московская), 8, г., Tskhinvali, Tskhinvali, 100001, South Ossetia; 42°13′44.4″N 43°58′00.4″E
- Campus: Urban
- Language: Ossetian, Russian
- Website: http://xipu.ru/

The South Ossetian State University, also known as Alexander Tibilov State University (in Ossetian: Хуссар Ирыстоны паддзахадон университет, in Georgian: სამხრეთ ოსეთის პედაგოგიური ინსტიტუტი; Russian: Юго-Осетинский государственный университет) is a private university located in the city of Tskhinvali, the capital of the breakaway region of South Ossetia, in Georgia. The university was heavily damaged in the 2008 Russo-Georgian War, but has since been rebuilt.

== History ==
Its history begins in 1932 when, on the basis of a decision of the Central Committee of the All-Union Communist Party of Bolsheviks, a decision was made to open a pedagogical institute in what was then Stalinir, in the South Ossetian Autonomous Oblast of the Soviet Union. Classes began on October of the same year under the name Stalinirsky Agricultural Institute. Between 1937 and 1938 there were 133 students, and a year later 255 people joined.

On December 30, 1961, the institute was renamed to the South Ossetian State Pedagogical Institute, a name that remained until 1989, where it was renamed after Alexander Arsenievich Tibilov, which in turn remained until the institute was transformed into a university in October 1993 on the initiative of then rector and head of the Supreme Council of South Ossetia, Ludwig Chivirov, creating its current name.

On 2008, the university was heavily damaged as a result of the 2008 Russo-Georgian War, where the original buildings were damaged by artillery and caught on fire. However, it has been rebuilt and updated since, and today, the 12 faculties of the university house approximately 3,000 students.

Since reopening, the university has established international relations with several faculties in Russia, and equally unrecognized territories, such as Shevchenko Transnistria State University, Donetsk National University, and the University of Luhansk.

In 2020, the South Ossetian State University established the Great Caucasus format together with the Abkhazian State University, the Russian North-Caucasus Federal University and the Armenian National University of Architecture and Construction of Armenia. The four universities will work more together and spread the use of the Russian language.

== Notable alumni ==
- Irina Yanovskaya, Georgian journalist and human rights activist
