= Domenty Kulumbegov =

South Ossetian politician

- Хъуылымбегты Доменти (Iron Ossetic); Доменти Кулумбегов (Russian)

13th Prime Minister of South Ossetia
- In office 20 January 2014 – 16 May 2017
- President: Leonid Tibilov; Anatoliy Bibilov
- Preceded by: Rostislav Khugayev
- Succeeded by: Erik Pukhayev

Personal details
- Born: 4 January 1956 (age 70) Thinala, South Ossetian Autonomous Oblast, Soviet Union (present-day South Ossetia and Georgia)
- Party: Independent

Domenty Sardionovich Kulumbegov (Iron Ossetic: Хъуылымбегты Сардионы фырт Доменти, romanized: Qwelembêgte Šârdione fert Domênti; Georgian: დომენტი სარდიონის ძე კულუმბეგოვი; Russian: Доменти Сардионович Кулумбегов, born 4 January 1956) was the Prime Minister of South Ossetia from January 20, 2014 to May 20, 2017. He was acting in that capacity until 2 April 2014.

Kulumbegov was born in Thinala in Gori district in the Georgian SSR.

Political offices
Preceded by Rostislav Khugayev	Prime Minister of South Ossetia; 2014–2017	Succeeded by Erik Pukhayev
