= Igor Sanakoyev =

South Ossetian politician

- Санахъоты Игор (Iron Ossetic); Игорь Санакоев (Russian)

Prime Minister of South Ossetia
- In office 18 September 2003 – 1 May 2005
- President: Eduard Kokoity
- Preceded by: Gerasim Kugayev
- Succeeded by: Zurab Kokoyev

Personal details
- Born: 20 February 1946 (age 80) Aspindza, Georgian SSR, Soviet Union]

Igor Viktorovich Sanakoyev (Iron Ossetic: Санахъоты Викторы фырт Игор, Sanaqotê Viktorê fêrt Igor; Russian: Игорь Викторович Санакоев; born 20 February 1946) is a South Ossetian politician a former Prime Minister of the Republic of South Ossetia, from 18 September 2003 until 1 May 2005.

Sanakoyev graduated from the Moscow Institute of Food Industry in 1984 and worked at various food processing enterprises in Tskhinvali and in North Ossetia. From 1998 until his appointment as Prime Minister, he worked at the North Ossetian branch of the Russian customs.

Sanakoyev is married and has a son.

Political offices
Preceded by Gerasim Kugayev	Prime Minister of South Ossetia; 2003–2005	Succeeded by Zurab Kokoyev
