= Stanislav Kochiev =

South Ossetian politician

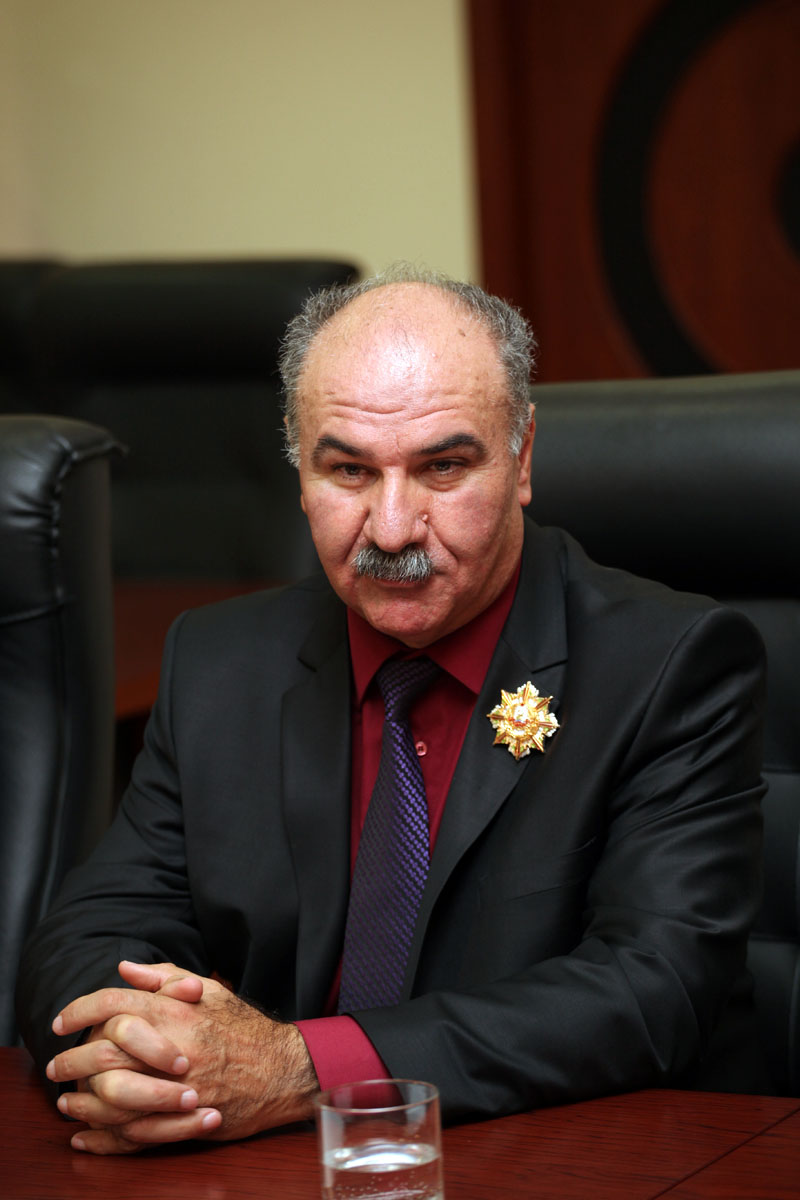
Kochiev in 2012

Stanislav Yakovlevich Kochiev (Iron Ossetic: Кошты Яковы фырт Станислав, romanized: Košty Jakovy fyrt Stanislav, Georgian: სტანისლავ კოჩიევი, romanized: st'anislav k'ochievi; Russian: Станислав Яковлевич Кочиев; born 7 April 1954) is a South Ossetian politician, who is a former presidential candidate and former chairman (speaker) of the Parliament of South Ossetia.

Kochiev was born in Kurta, and went to school in Tskhinvali, where he attended the state pedagogical institute. He graduated in 1977 and went to work as a high school history teacher. In 1980, Kochiev joined the local branch of the Communist Party of the Soviet Union, where he became head of the ideological department in 1988.

In 1991, after South Ossetia's declaration of independence, Kochiyev headed the Committee on National Affairs and the Ministry of Information and Press.

Kochiev was elected first secretary (leader) of the Communist Party of South Ossetia, the party he still leads today. First elected into parliament in the 1990 election, he has been a member ever since, becoming the parliament's speaker in 1999. In the 2004 election, the Communist Party was defeated and Kochiev was replaced as speaker with Znaur Gassiev. Although the Communist Party did not fare much better in the 2009 election, Kochiev was once again elected speaker. The Communist Party fared poorly in the 2014 election, losing all its seats. Kochiev was replaced as speaker by Anatoly Bibilov of United Ossetia.

In the 2001 presidential election, Kochiev finished second with 25% of the vote, necessitating a runoff against Eduard Kokoity. Kochiev lost the runoff 40% to 53%.

Kochiev is married and has one daughter.

In 2016 Kochiev was working on the committee to draft the new Constitution of South Ossetia.

Preceded by Kosta Dzugaev	Chairman of the Parliament of South Ossetia; 1999 - 2004	Succeeded by Znaur Gassiev
Preceded by Znaur Gassiev	Chairman of the Parliament of South Ossetia; 2009 - 2011	Succeeded by Zurab Kokoyev; Acting
Preceded by Zurab Kokoyev; Acting	Chairman of the Parliament of South Ossetia; 2012 - 2014	Succeeded by Anatoly Bibilov
