= Leonid Tibilov =

President of South Ossetia from 2012 to 2017

- Тыбылты Леонид (Iron Ossetic); Леонид Тибилов (Russian)
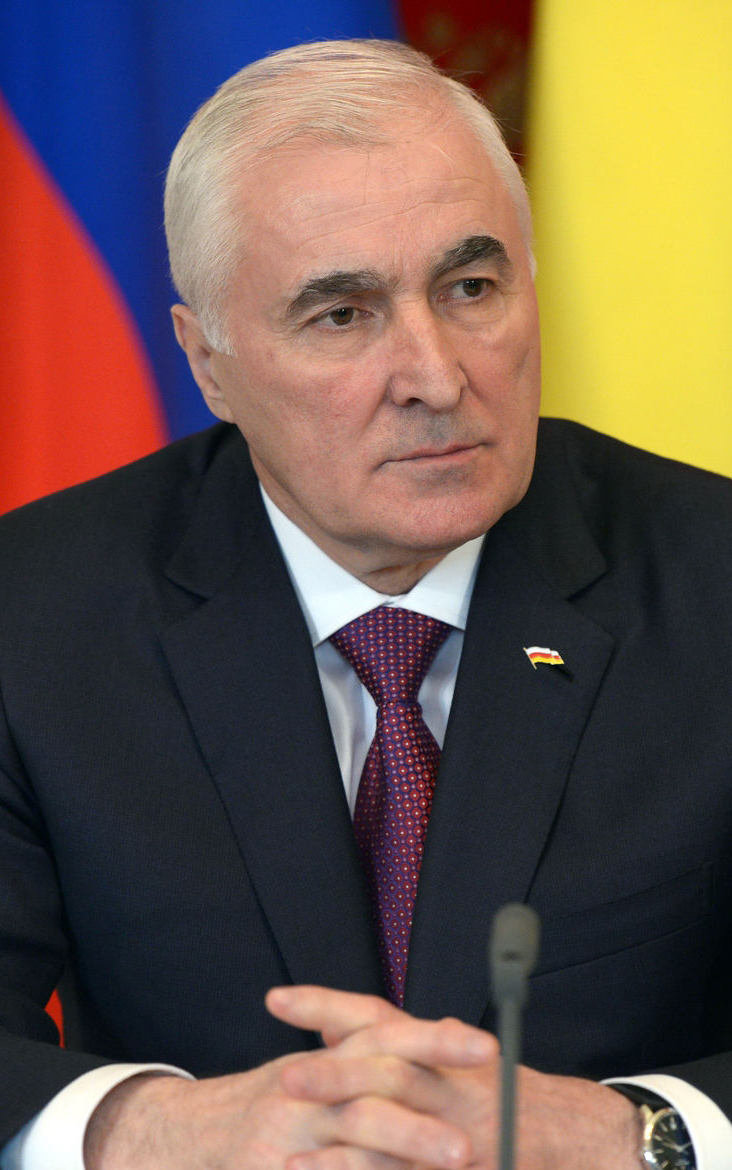
- Tibilov in 2015

3rd President of South Ossetia
- In office 19 April 2012 – 21 April 2017
- Prime Minister: Vadim Brovtsev; Rostislav Khugayev; Domenty Kulumbegov
- Preceded by: Vadim Brovtsev (Acting)
- Succeeded by: Anatoliy Bibilov

Personal details
- Born: 28 March 1951 (age 75) Verkhny Dvan, South Ossetian AO, Georgian SSR, Soviet Union (now South Ossetia)
- Party: Independent

Leonid Kharitonovich Tibilov (Iron Ossetic: Тыбылты Харитъоны фырт Леонид, romanized: Tybylty Xarithony fyrt Leonid; Russian: Леонид Харитонович Тибилов; Georgian: ლეონიდ თიბილოვი; born 28 March 1951) is a South Ossetian politician who served as the third president of South Ossetia from 2012 to 2017 after winning the 2012 South Ossetian presidential election.

== Career ==
Leonid Tibilov headed the South Ossetian KGB as South Ossetia's Security Minister from 1992 to 1998. He was then a first deputy prime minister and co-chaired a Georgian-Ossetian peacekeeping commission. Tibilov stood at the 2006 presidential election losing to Eduard Kokoity, who won 98% of the vote.

Before the 2012 election Tibilov distanced himself from the outgoing President Kokoity. Tibilov is reported to be subservient to Russia and pledged to consult Russia before appointing a government if he was successful at the election.

In the first round of the 2012 Presidential election, Tibilov received 42.5% of the vote to lead David Sanakoyev. In the second round, Tibilov was elected president with 54.1% of the vote.

In a move towards integration with the Russian Federation, Tibilov proposed in December 2015 a name change to "South Ossetia–Alania" in analogy with "North Ossetia–Alania", a Russian federal subject. Tibilov furthermore suggested holding a referendum on joining the Russian Federation prior to April 2017, which would lead to a united "Ossetia–Alania". In April 2016, Tibilov said he intended to hold the referendum before August of that year. However, on 30 May, Tibilov postponed the referendum until after the presidential election due in April 2017. At the 2017 South Ossetian name change referendum, nearly 80 percent of those who voted endorsed the name-change, while the presidential race was won by Anatoly Bibilov – against the incumbent, Tibilov, who had been supported by Moscow and who, unlike Bibilov, was ready to heed Moscow's wish for the integration referendum not be held any time soon. However, Bibilov posteriorly also stated that a referendum would probably be done in 2017, although he still said that it could be postponed.

Political offices
Preceded by Vadim Brovtsev; Acting	President of South Ossetia; 2012–2017	Succeeded by Anatoliy Bibilov
