= Unity Party (South Ossetia) =

Unity Party Иудзинад
- Leader: Zurab Kokoyev
- Founded: 2003
- Succeeded by: United Ossetia (2012)
- Ideology: Nationalism; Social conservatism Russophilia
- Political position: Centre

The Unity Party (Iron Ossetic: Иудзинад, romanized: Iudzinad; Georgian: ერთიანობა, romanized: ertianoba; Russian: Единство, romanized: Yedinstvo; officially, the South Ossetian Republican Political Party "Unity") was a major political party with a socially conservative ideology in South Ossetia during the 2000s. South Ossetia is a partially recognized Caucasian republic, considered by most countries to be a part of Georgia.

== History ==
The Unity Party, founded in 2003, supported former President Eduard Kokoity, and was for a decade the largest political party in South Ossetia. After the 2009 elections, the party held 17 out of 34 seats in South Ossetia's parliament. It is modeled after and is closely linked to the United Russia party, with which it has signed an inter-party cooperation agreement. The party is a winner of the 2004 and 2009 parliamentary elections.

It is currently led by Zurab Kokoyev.

=== 2024 election ===
On April 13, 2024, the party held its XIV party congress in Tskhinvali where they nominated a party list for the upcoming election. Their list was approved by the Central Election Commission on May 18, 2024 with the exception of one candidate, Felix Chertkoev, due to holding a Georgian passport and citizenship. In June Dzhambolat Tedeyev, after learning that his own political party, Patriots of Alanya, had registered too late for the deadline to participate in the election, offered to "buy" the Unity Party. At the time, the Unity Party was facing impending liquidation for bankruptcy, but still refused Tedeyev's offer. The party earned just 432 individual votes, or 1.98% of the electorate, and no seats.

== Election results ==
=== Parliament ===
Election	Votes	%	Seats	+/–	Leader
2004	(#1)	54.6	20 / 34	▲20	Zurab Kokoyev
2009	21,246 (#1)	46.32	17 / 34	▼3	Zurab Kokoyev
2014	1,219 (#6)	6.02	0 / 34	▼17	Zurab Kokoyev
2019	630 (#7)	2.83	0 / 34	▼	Zurab Kokoyev
2024	432 (#7)	1.98	0 / 34	▼	Zurab Kokoyev

== See also ==
- United Russia
- United Ossetia
