= 2006 South Ossetian presidential election =

- 12 November 2006
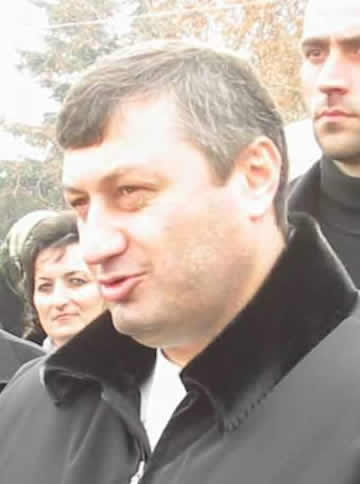

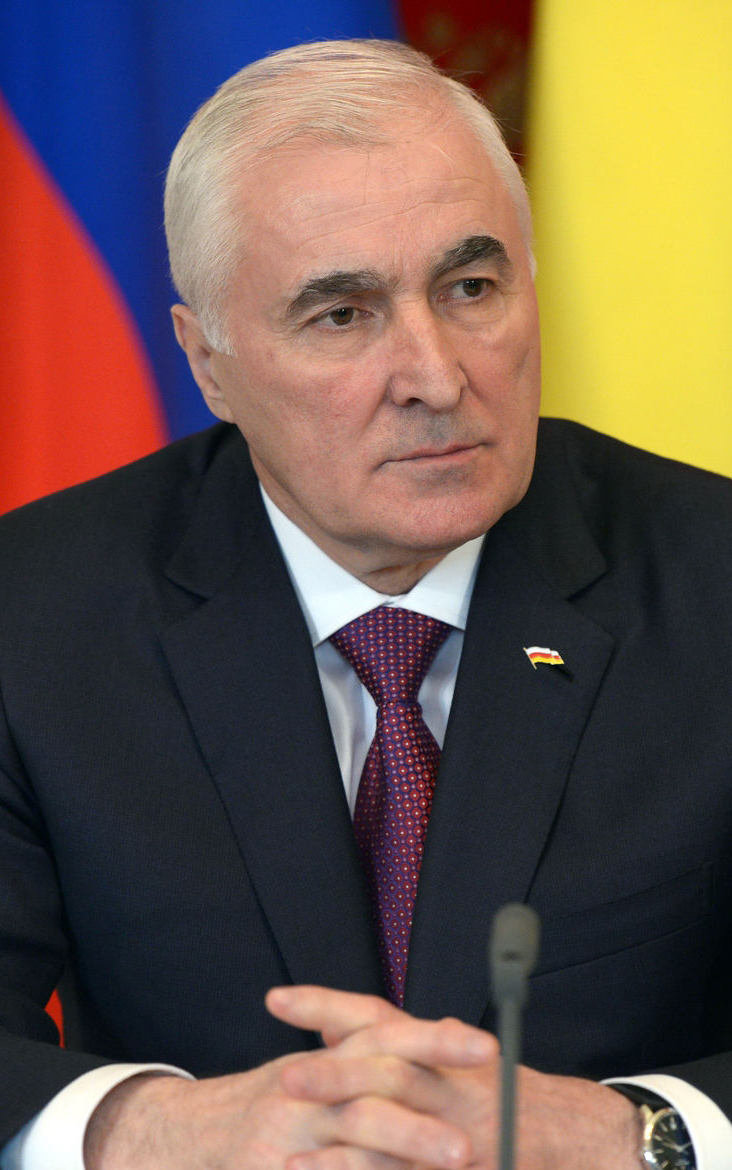
| Nominee | Eduard Kokoity | Leonid Tibilov |
| Party | Unity Party | Independent |
| Popular vote | 51,150 | 476 |
| Percentage | 98.06% | 0.91% |
President before election
Eduard Kokoity
Unity Party
Elected President
Eduard Kokoity
Unity Party

Presidential elections were held in South Ossetia on 12 November 2006, coinciding with the South Ossetian independence referendum. Incumbent Eduard Kokoity was seeking a second full five-year term. He was re-elected with more than 98% of the vote. According to the de facto authorities, the election was monitored by a team of 34 international observers from Germany, Austria, Poland, Sweden and other countries at 78 polling stations. The election process was criticised by local civic society and the results were deemed likely to be inflated.

== Results ==
| Candidate | Votes | % |
|---|---|---|
| Eduard Kokoity | 51,150 | 98.06 |
| Leonid Tibilov | 476 | 0.91 |
| Inal Pukhayev | 194 | 0.37 |
| Oleg Gabodze | 175 | 0.34 |
| Against all | 168 | 0.32 |
| Total | 52,163 | 100.00 |
| Valid votes | 52,163 | 99.47 |
| Invalid/blank votes | 280 | 0.53 |
| Total votes | 52,443 | 100.00 |
| Registered voters/turnout | 55,163 | 95.07 |
Source: Cominf

== Alternative elections and referendum ==
South Ossetian opposition politicians, some of whom had left Tskhinvali due to a conflict with the de facto president Eduard Kokoity, set up an alternative Central Election Commission and nominated their candidates for presidency: Gogi Chigoyev, Teimuraz Djeragoyev, Tamar Charayeva, and Dmitry Sanakoyev, who served as defense minister and then as prime minister for several months in 2001 under Kokoity's predecessor, Ludwig Chibirov. Voters were also to answer a question: "do you agree with the renewal of talks with Georgia on a federal union." The alternative elections and referendum were held in the villages with mixed Georgian-Ossetian population not controlled by the secessionist government. The Salvation Union of South Ossetia which organised the election turned down a request from a Georgian NGO, "Multinational Georgia", to monitor it. The released results of both elections were described as very likely to be inflated.
