= Inal Tasoev =

Inal Tasoev may refer to:

- Inal Tasoev (judoka), North Ossetian judoka
- Inal Tasoev (politician), South Ossetian politician
