= Sarmat Ikoev =

South Ossetian politician

Member of the Parliament of South Ossetia
- Incumbent
- Assumed office 2019

Personal details
- Party: Independent

Sarmat Ikoev is an Ossetian politician from the partially recognized Caucasian Republic of South Ossetia, which most of the United Nations recognizes as part of Georgia, occupied by Russia.

== Biography ==
Prior to his election to Parliament, Ikoev would serve in several minor roles in Anatoly Bibilov's camp, namely serving on his campaign during the 2011 South Ossetian presidential election, where he was the election observer for the village of Ruk. Where, during the election, 300 citizens of North Ossetia attempted to vote, mostly in favor of Bibilov, compared to the village's population of just 178 of which only 65 claimed to have voted.

Ikoev would be elected to the Parliament of South Ossetia during the 2019 election, as an independent, however, affiliated himself with Bibilov, stating he would follow United Ossetia's "course" and "support" the party, while not officially joining. Ikoev stated that he ran as an independent to promote bi-partisanship and that he would support "any party" and "any faction" if it was in the best interest of the South Ossetian people and his constituents.

Following the sacking of Uruzmag Dzhagayev as Prosecutor General of South Ossetia due to his role in the Murder of Inal Djabiev, Bibilov chose Sochi based Vitaly Savchenko as his replacement. However, in a rare instance of opposition, Parliament rejected Savchenko's nomination to the post due to his lack of South Ossetian citizenship. Ikoev, alongside vice-speaker Peter Gasssiev, dramatically walked out of parliament and abstained, which allowed the rejection vote to narrowly pass.

In December 2022 Ikoev was on the committee that implemented the integration of South Ossetia's tariffs to be in accordance with the Eurasian Economic Union (EEU), despite not officially being a member of the EEU, by implementing its tariff rates the South Ossetian government hopes to open up trade to other countries, (Note: Other than Russia, EEU members include Kyrgyzstan, Belarus, Armenia, and Kazakhstan) and reduce its dependence on Russia, which accounts for 95% of all imports into South Ossetia.

In November 2023, Ikoev, alongside Zaza Driaev, went on a state visit to North Ossetia to meet with their parliament over implementing matching laws on "Physical Culture and Sports" in both North and South Ossetia.
