= Zhanna Zasseeva =

South Ossetian politician

South Ossetian Minister of Culture
- In office 2017–2022
- President: Anatoly Bibilov

South Ossetian State Councilor
- In office 2005–2017
- President: Eduard Kokoity; Vadim Brovtsev (Note: Acting president following Kokoity's resignation); Leonid Tibilov

Zhanna Zasseeva is an Ossetian politician from the partially recognized Caucasian Republic of South Ossetia, which most of the UN recognizes as part of Georgia, occupied by Russia.

== Biography ==
=== State Councilor ===
From 2005 to 2017 Zasseeva served as State Councilor for Eduard Kokoity, Vadim Brovtsev, and Leonid Tibilov. During the latter of which, in 2013, praised a state-run poll which claimed mass support for the newly implemented holiday "Day of Russia" stating that "I cannot imagine my life without Russia." By 2016 she was the State Adviser to the President, as well as a member of the commission for drafting the Constitution of South Ossetia. In which capacity she stated that the new Constitution must prioritize basic rule of law, and the independence of the South Ossetian judiciary, to work on a purely meritocratic system. She also claimed that her primary inspiration was the Constitution of North Ossetia, and that her proposal was well received by unnamed Russian officials.

=== Minister of culture ===
Zasseeva served as the minister of culture for Anatoly Bibilov, President from 2017 to 2022. In that capacity claimed that the 1918-1920 Georgian–Ossetian conflict was a genocide and organized a nationwide memorial for the 100th anniversary in 2019 alongside Amiran Dyakonov. In 2019 she also announced the creation of a national day of mourning for the Zar tragedy when the Georgian army shelled a convoy of trucks, which South Ossetia claimed was a refugee column, killing 33 civilians.

As Minister of Culture, Zasseeva supported an effort to integrate with the Conservatorio Statale di Musica "Gioachino Rossini" in conjunction with Dmitriy Medoev, minister of foreign affairs, and Gennadiy Kokoev, the minister of the economy. The South Ossetian government touted the effort, as cooperation with Italy, to increase support for South Ossetian recognition in Europe. Additionally, Zasseeva went on a state visit to Abkhazia alongside Medoev, Oleg Botsiev, the South Osstian ambassador to Abkhazia, Uruzmag Dzhagaev, the South Ossetian prosecutor general, and Viktor Shargaev, head of the State Security Committee to promote bilateral relations, and a joint effort for international recognition.

In the wake of the Murder of Inal Djabiev, Zasseeva, along with South Ossetia's Ombudsman, Inal Tasoev, were among a delegation sent to Djabiev's house, following massive public backlash, promising a fair investigation into his death, however, Djabiev's widow rebuked them, stating "We distrust both MPs and investigators." One of Zasseeva's last acts as minister was to unveil a memorial to the Ered tragedy, where South Ossetia accuses Georgia of burying 12 Ossetians alive.

=== Women's league ===
Following her departure from politics, Zasseeva has founded and leads an NGO, the "Women's league," which, as its chairwoman, endorsed an effort to change South Ossetian history curriculum to center around the "Alan Code of Honor", focusing on Ossetians loyal to Russia since 1749. She also promoted the expansion of Immortal Regiments in South Ossetia.
