= Igor Naniyev =

South Ossetian politician

South Ossetian Minister of Internal Affairs
- In office 2017 – August 28, 2020
- Preceded by: Akhsar Lavoev
- Succeeded by: Merab Pukhayev (acting)

Personal details
- Party: United Ossetia

Igor Naniyev is an Ossetian politician from South Ossetia known for his role in the political fallout from the Murder of Inal Djabiev.

== Biography ==
Naniyev was named Anatoly Bibilov's Minister of Internal Affairs following his election as President.

In July 2019 Naniyev negotiated for the reparation of two South Ossetian criminals to South Ossetia following their flight into Georgia where they were detained by the Georgian police.

=== Murder of Inal Djabiev ===
On August 17, 2020, Naniyev would be subjected to an assassination attempt when his car was targeted in a drive by shooting. The South Ossetian police would quickly detain four residents of Tskhinvali; Inal Djabiev, Zvezdina Maria, Gersan Kulumbegov, and Nikolai Tskhovrebov. However, it would be revealed that the group had no relation to the shooting, and where instead a group of local political activists opposed to the Bibilov's government. Djabiev would then be tortured to death by South Ossetian police, and the remaining three where released with all charges dropped.

In response, massive protests rocked South Ossetia, which called on Bibilov to resign, and for the police and Naniyev to be punished for their role in the event. In an effort to end the political deadlock caused by the opposition boycotting parliament until Bibilov resigned, Bibilov sacked Naniyev for "abuses of power" while the opposition continued to also call for the resignation of Bibilov and Chief Prosecutor Uruzmag Dzhagayev. Naniyev would be succeed by his deputy, Merab Pukhayev, as interim interior minister.

By July 6, 2022, the attempted murder case against Djabiev collapsed, with the court arguing that Naniyev attempted to fabricate Djabiev's criminal record, as well as a ballistics report finding it impossible for the passing car to be who shot at Naniyev's car, instead reporting that the bullets came from the third floor of a building across the street.

On April 19, 2023, Naniyev was sued by Djabiev's widow for exceeding the power of his office.
