= 2006 South Ossetian independence referendum =

- 12 November 2006
- Should the republic of South Ossetia retain its current status as an independent State, and be recognized by the international community?

Results
Choice	Votes	%
Yes	51,565	99.88%
No	60	0.12%
Valid votes	51,625	98.97%
Invalid or blank votes	538	1.03%
Total votes	52,163	100.00%
Registered voters/turnout	55,163	94.56%
Results by district
Yes
90–100%

South Ossetia, a mostly unrecognized republic in the South Caucasus, formerly the South Ossetian Autonomous Oblast within the Georgian Soviet Socialist Republic with its capital in Tskhinvali, held a referendum on independence on November 12, 2006.

== Referendum ==
The voters in the independence referendum organized by Tskhinvali answered the question: "Should the republic of South Ossetia retain its current status as an independent State, and be recognized by the international community?"

Parallel to the referendum and elections, the Georgia-backed Ossetian opposition movement organized its own elections in Eredvi, inhabited by ethnic Georgians, in which five Ossetian presidential candidates opposed to Eduard Kokoity took part. On the alternative referendum the voters answered the following question: "Should South Ossetia engage in discussions with Tbilisi concerning a federal State uniting it with Georgia?" According to the Electoral Commission of Alternative Elections, 42,000 voters turned out for the elections held in the territories under Georgian control, but Tskhinvali claimed that the voters numbered only 14,000. Dmitry Sanakoyev was elected by 88% of voters as the alternative President of South Ossetia.

== Results ==
On 13 November 2006, the Central Election Commission of South Ossetia announced the results of the referendum. 99% of voters supported independence, with voter turnout at 95%.

Choice	Votes	%
For	51,565	99.88
Against	60	0.12
Total	51,625	100.00
Valid votes	51,625	98.97
Invalid/blank votes	538	1.03
Total votes	52,163	100.00
Registered voters/turnout	55,163	94.56
Source: Direct Democracy

== Reactions ==
The Georgian government has declared both the election and the referendum illegal, but it was believed to support the Salvation Union of Ossetians, the organization in charge of holding the alternative elections. Kokoity thus accused Tbilisi of staging the alternative elections that aimed at "dividing the Ossetian people".

On 12 September 2006, the Chairman of the Russian State Duma, Boris Gryzlov, welcomed the appointed South Ossetian referendum and announced that Russian parliamentarians would observe the voting process. On 13 September 2006, the Georgian State Minister for Conflict Resolution Issues, Merab Antadze, issued a statement, condemning Gryzlov's statement as "destructive."

The European Union Special Representative to the South Caucasus, Peter Semneby, downplayed the forthcoming South Ossetian referendum and said in Moscow, on 13 September 2006, that the referendum would not contribute to the conflict resolution process in South Ossetia.

On 13 September 2006, the Council of Europe (CoE) Secretary General Terry Davis commented on the problem, stating that:

The secessionist authorities of the South Ossetian region of Georgia are wasting time and effort on the organisation of a "referendum on independence" in November. [...] I do not think that anyone will recognise the result of such a referendum. If the people in power in South Ossetia are genuinely committed to the interest of the people they claim to represent, they should engage in meaningful negotiations with the Georgian government in order to find a peaceful, internationally accepted outcome.

The head of the Institute of CIS Countries and the member of the Russian State Duma, Konstantin Zatulin, is quoted during his visit to Artsakh in October 2006, where he spoke only about Artsakh and Transnistria, as saying:

Recognition of the so-called unrecognized states is not far off. Unrecognized republics have all attributes of state system and stable democratic system.

On 2 October 2006, the Organization for Security and Co-operation in Europe (OSCE) Chairman-in-Office, Belgian Foreign Minister Karel De Gucht, said during his visit to Tbilisi:

I also call the South Ossetian authorities’ intention to hold a referendum counterproductive. It will not be recognized by the international community and it will not be recognized by the OSCE and it will impede the peace process.

On 11 November 2006, Secretary General of NATO Jaap de Hoop Scheffer said in a statement:

On behalf of NATO, I join other international leaders in rejecting the so-called “referendum” and “elections” conducted in the South Ossetia/Tskhinvali region of Georgia. Such actions serve no purpose other than to exacerbate tensions in the South Caucasus region.

On 11 November 2006, Luis Tascón, a member of the National Assembly of Venezuela, said during a press-conference in Tskhinvali: "Those people who wish to be free, will be free." He also hinted that Venezuela might eventually recognize the South Ossetian independence, claiming that president Chávez would make a correct decision. He also noted that his presence in Tskhinvali did not guarantee the recognition the South Ossetian independence by Venezuelan Government.

On 11 November 2006, Sergei Fyodorov, an observer and Latvian Parliament member of Russian nationality, and a member of Socialist Party, stated during a press-conference in Tskhinvali that all peoples had the right for self-determination, and it could not be ignored. He also made a commitment to inform the other members of the Latvian Saeima of his observations.

On 13 November 2006, the European Union foreign ministers said that the vote did not contribute to conflict resolution. The OSCE and the Council of Europe reiterated that they would not recognize the referendum and condemned it as unproductive. An EU statement was later joined by Ukraine.
