= Nugzar Gabaraev =

South Ossetian politician

Minister of Healthcare
- In office November 1, 2008 – c.2011
- President: Eduard Kokoity; Vadim Brovtsev(acting)

Nugzar Gabaraev is an Ossetian politician from the partially recognized Caucasian republic of South Ossetia. (Note: All but 4 UN member states recognize South Ossetia as part of Georgia illegally occupied by Russia) that served in the cabinet of Eduard Kokoity

== Biography ==
Gabaraev was named Eduard Kokoity's Healthcare Minister on November 1, 2008, following a massive change-up in the country's executive. Gabaraev would also serve as Kokoity's "state advisor". In these capacities Gabaraev created a program for reparation of around 4,500 Ossetian refugees from Georgia outside of South Ossetia into South Osseita. Gabaraev would be sacked by Vadim Brovtsev, after Kokoity resigned.
