= Alan Parastaev =

Osettian politician

Alan Parastaev (Georgian: ალან ფარასტაევი; born 5 July 1951; death 16 March 2023) is an ethnic Ossetian jurist and politician who had served in the government of South Ossetia from 1992 to 2005. He was arrested by the South Ossetian authorities in 2006, but escaped to the Georgian-controlled territory in 2008. Since then Parastaev has worked in the government of Georgia.

== Career ==
Born in Tskhinvali, South Ossetian AO, Georgian SSR, Parastaev graduated from the North Ossetian State University with a degree in law in 1981 and worked as a judge in South Ossetia's Java District from 1987 to 1992. He worked in the de facto government in Tskhinvali, being Chairman of the Supreme Court (1992–1994), Minister of Internal Affairs (1994–1998), Minister of Justice (1998–2002) and again Chairman of the Supreme Court (2002–2005).

In November 2006, he was arrested and sentenced to an 18-year prison term for allegedly plotting the assassination of Eduard Kokoity. His family tried to apply to the European Court of Human Rights and reported that Parastaev had been mistreated in prison and beaten "almost to death".

Parastaev escaped to Georgian-controlled territory after prison authorities set inmates free at the start of the August 2008 war. In a February 2009 interview with the Georgian Imedi TV, Parastaev said that Kokoity had organized a series of terrorist attacks and ordered murders for which he blamed Georgia.

Since 2009, Parastaev has been serving as Deputy Minister in the newly created Ministry for Penitentiary, Probation and Legal Assistance Issues of Georgia.

Prior to his defection, Parastaev worked on the committee to draft a new Constitution of South Ossetia.

Died March 16, 2023.
