= Murder of Inal Djabiev =

South Ossetian protests

Djabiev protests
- Date: August 28, 2020 - February 26, 2021
- Location: Tskhinvali, South Ossetia
- Caused by: Death of Inal Djabiev in police custody
- Goals: Arrest and imprisonment of police officers responsible Resignation of Anatoly Bibilov and his government Legislative reform against police brutality
- Methods: Protests; Continuous occupation of Tskhinvali
- Result: Partial Success: Bibilov sacks his cabinet but remains in power; Ongoing trial of several police officers; Defeat of Bibilov in the 2022 presidential election; Several officers sentenced for committing violent acts

Parties
(South Ossetia) Government of South Ossetia; United Ossetia	Protesters; Supported by: Nykhaz

Lead figures
Anatoly Bibilov; Igor Naniyev; Uruzhmag Dzhagaev	Maya Djabieva; Supported by: David Sanakoev; 17 Opposition MPs

Number
	1000+ (peak); 100+ (consistently)

On August 28, 2020, in South Ossetia, the South Ossetian Police reported that a suspect in a murder plot against Igor Naniyev, the Minister of Internal Affairs, Inal Djabiev, had died in custody. After it was revealed that Djabiev was not only innocent, but also brutally tortured to death, massive protests erupted in the capital of South Ossetia, Tskhinvali, demanding reform to not only to the police, but also the entire legal system of the partially recognized Republic. (Note: Most of the UN recognizes South Ossetia as part of Georgia, occupied by Russia. However, six countries recognize South Ossetia as independent.)

== Events ==
On August 20, 2020, the South Ossetian police claimed that four residents of Tskhinvali, Inal Djabiev, Zvezdina Maria, Gersan Kulumbegov, and Nikolai Tskhovrebov, stopped their car outside the family home of the South Ossetian Minister of Internal Affairs, Igor Naniyev, and fired two gunshots into Naniyev's car. Naniyev would escape without any harm, and all four would be detained on August 23 and would be taken to a local police station. Under oath, the leader of the investigation against Djabiev stated he was instead arrested on August 27, conflicting with the official reports he approved.

Djabiev was a vocal political activist in favor of reform, and frequently clashed with the government. Djabiev was also a veteran of the 2008 Russo-Georgian war where he earned a medal for distinguishing himself during the Battle of Tskhinvali. Djabiev had previously been beaten by the police in 2018, in an incident where his jaw was broken and several teeth where knocked out. According to the prosecutor general's office on August 29, the police officers responsible had been planning the incident for some time and "had a personal dislike for Inal."

At the station the local police tortured both Djabiev and Kulumbegov, with Djabiev dying in custody, with his death being announced on August 28. Shortly after Kulumbegov would be released with all charges against him dropped. The police would also file a ballistics report which concluded that neither Djabiev nor Kulumbegov was the individual who fired the gunshots.

On August 30 Nikolai Tskhovrebov would be released from police custody to the local hospital. At the time of his arrival he was in a coma showing signs of extensive beating. The hospital staff would also leak to the public that Tskhovrebov also showed signs of significant electrocution.

== Protests ==
Protest at least a thousand strong began on August 28 outside the South Ossetian parliament. On August 31 Djabiev's coffin was laid on the steps of parliament prior to his funeral, with protesters demanding the resignation of Anatoly Bibilov. This coffin laying saw a heightened response from the police, with at least one protester, Timur Tskhurbati, a vocal democratic activist, had his nose and cheekbone broken by plainclothes officers due to a post he made to Facebook calling for continued protests.

Starting on December 4, 2020, Djabiev's widow rallied an anti-police brutality protest outside the South Ossetian general prosecutor's office for over a year, demanding reform to the South Ossetian Police stating that "people are worried: everyone can be caught and illegally held, and then at the end of the day. How it happened with Inal." These protests where met by riot police, resulting in skirmishes with protesters, and quickly grew into one of the substantial protests in South Ossetia since 2011.

Ludwig Chibirov, Leonid Tibilov, and various members of the Parliament of South Ossetia attempted to negotiate with the protestors, promising police reform and a return to the rule of law. Meanwhile, the South Ossetian opposition joined with the protesters, demanding governmental reform and the resignation of Bibilov and his government. In solidarity with the protestors, the opposition, and some members of the governing coalition, boycotted attending sessions of parliament, bringing the government to a halt with David Sanakoev emerging as a political leader of the protesters. In return Bibilov opened an investigation into "unprofessionalism and brutal arbitrariness of law enforcement officers."

The protesters, which ranged from a few hundred to 30–40, remained in the main square of Tskhinvali for their continuous occupation despite that winter's cold snap. Tskhinvali police blocked these protesters from purchasing hot-drinks, cooking with natural gas, or setting up tents, requiring them to camp in the open during the winter. The police's response to a protest against police brutality only reinvigorated the protesters.

By December 15 Bibilov offered to meet with Djabiev's family, and pay for their forensic investigation into his death. On December 20, minister of culture Zhanna Zasseeva, and Tskhinvali's ombudsman, Inal Tasoev, were sent to negotiate with the protesters, urging them to return home to prevent the risk of them freezing to death, promising a fair and free investigation into Inal's death, however, his widow rejected this, stating that "We distrust both MPs and investigators. They offered us to leave the square as they pity us, saying that we'll freeze there. But the dismissal of the Public Prosecutor General was not touched on. But it is he who causes our distrust." Shortly after this meeting the protesters set up an impromptu memorial for Djabiev consisting of a portrait, candles and a wreath. The protests would finally end on February 26, 2021.

On May 17, 2021, forensic reports on the death of Djabiev where returned. One, by South Ossetian officials, reported that his death was due to acute heart failure caused by a trauma. A parallel Russian team reported that his death was due to acute heart failure caused by drug withdrawals. Djabiev's widow rejected both reports and demanded an independent third report. In June 2021, the South Ossetian investigation team reported that their investigation was not free or fair, and that Bibilov had the investigation be pressured by one of his lackeys, Zarina Dzagoeva, to publish "knowingly false data" on Djabiev's death certificate. Shortly afterwards opposition MPs called for the arrest of Dzagoeva.

== Reaction ==
On September 1, 2020, 17 Members of Parliament boycotted sessions, stating that they would not return to work until Uruzmag Djagaev resigned, crippling the government. Djagaev stated that he would not resign until "select" members of parliament renounced their parliamentary immunity, so his successor can prosecute them. Shortly after President Anatoly Bibilov sacked his entire cabinet, including Djagaev, and his prime minister, Erik Pukhayev, resigned. Due to the boycott, when the other half of parliament met to form a parliamentary commission to investigate the death, it was unable to proceed, hampering government efforts to investigate who was responsible.

On August 13, 2020, South Ossetian Minister of Defense Vladimir Pukhaev was dismissed after it was revealed that a member of the Special Forces extrajudicially beat Azamat Djigkaev, a resident of Tskhinvali, and that the member of the Special Forces was involved in the detaining and torture of Djabiev. Pukhaev was asked to sack the commander of the special forces for the incident, and refused, resulting in both him and his deputy Igor Alborov being dismissed.

On January 13, 2021, former presidents Tibilov and Chibirov, as well as former MPs Stanislav Kochiev and Vyacheslav Gobozov as well as chairman of the Central Election Commission Boris Chochiev, signed a document demanding a fair and free investigation, stating it was the only way to resolve the political crisis. The inability for the government to operate had resulted in a failure to pass a budget for the 2021 fiscal year.

On May 21, 2021, Bibilov gave a speech to the South Ossetian parliament denouncing the protesters who called for police reform, and reform to the prosecutor generals office, but stated that those responsible for Djabiev's death will be punished in accordance to the law.

On July 15, 2022, Djabiev was posthumously acquitted in the Naniyev assassination plot by the Supreme Court of South Ossetia, in reaction Djabiev's widow stated she planned to pursue a civil trial against those responsible, for compensation for their children.

On August 9, 2022, Azamat Djigkaev, a resident of Tskhinvali, was beaten by special forces personnel and it was revealed that one of the perpetrators was also involved in the torture of Djabiev and that Djigkaev was targeted for his role in the protests. Djigkaev took part in the continuous occupation outside parliament, and was a high-ranking member of the NGO "Civic Platform."

Biblov's handling of both the investigation and protests was one of the key reasons he lost the 2022 South Ossetian presidential election to longtime opposition leader Alan Gagloev of the Nykhaz party, which were the most vocal parliamentary voice in favor of the government boycott.

In 2024 five members of Bibilov's United Ossetia would defect from the party, citing Bibilov's handling of the investigation and protests, founding the new political party For Justice led by Harry Muldarov.

== Trial ==
On September 7, 2020, the first arrest against the murderers of Djabiev was made, a Tskhinvali policeman, Atsamaz Naniev, who had a reputation for torturing detainees. Naniev would go on a 8-day hunger strike from May 9, 2021, to May 17, stating that the prosecution has yet to prove his guilt, and that without a trial his own detention was illegal.

Eventually, the South Ossetian government caved to the protesters, and held those they deemed responsible on trial for murder of Djabiev. Namely, Oleg Tekhov, the officer in charge of the interrogation, as well as eight employees of the Ministry of Internal Affairs including Igor Naniev, and Prosecutor General Uruzhmag Dzhagaev, who were both sacked from their posts. Tekhov insisted that he had only seen the individuals for 15 minutes as part of their processing, and left the actual interrogations to his underlings, however, the head of the South Ossetian Militsiya, Uruzmag Margiyev, testified that Tekhov not only picked out the room for the torturing, but also personally attended and participated. Margiyev also stated that the torture lasted less than an hour, and that Tekhov personally saw that Djabiev's body was loaded into a car to be taken to a hospital to be pronounced dead, and that Tekhov personally signed the transfer paper to the hospital.

On July 7, 2022, the criminal trial, which had been taken to the Tskhinvali City Court, was returned to the prosecutor general's office, stating that the prosecution had illegally obtained materials. Most of the materials proving Djabiev's torture were leaked to the public, and as such could not be used in a South Ossetian court. The trial would remain in limbo for over two years due to the prosecutor general's office refusing to touch the case, stating that it was "still in the judiciary" citing the Tskhinvali City Court's failure to fill out proper paperwork.

The court demanded that two victims, Gersan Kulumbegov, and Nikolai Tskhovrebov, should be "forcefully" made to attend the trial, however, both where outside the country in North Ossetia and the court determined to hold the trial with them absent. Over the course of the trial seven witness from every branch of law enforcement in South Ossetia, both the regular police, Militsiya, SOBR, and State Security Committee (KGB), all pinned the blame on another agency, stating that when Djabiev was under their custody he had no physical signs of torture, and that the agency they handed him over to must have performed the torture.

The pro-Russian opposition has gone on to call President Alan Gagloev's pick for Prosecutor General, Grigory Sobaev who made the case his top priority, as a "henchman" and that the opposition politicized the killing to "seriously undermine Bibilov’s rating." The Tskhinvali City Court issued its final verdict on the case on April 10, 2025, with Jumbar Bibilov, an officer of the Interior Ministry, being found guilty under Article 286, Part 3(a) of the Russian Criminal Code (Note: “acts committed with the use of violence or the threat of violence”) and was sentenced to five years in prison and banned from holding public office. Two others, Andrei Jioev and Alan Bagaev, where sentenced to 3 years in prison commuted to time served, while Zaur Gogichaev and Marat Khugaev were each fined 100,000 rubles and served no time as the statute of limitations had expired. Relatives of Djabiev voiced dissatisfaction with the results, stating they didn't go far enough as neither the head of the Criminal Investigation Department Dzhemal Bibilov, nor the former Prosecutor General Uruzmag Dzhagaev nor former Foreign Minister Igor Naniev where sentenced. Meanwhile Russian officials denied that Djabiev was tortured, and insisted on the defendants total innocence, with protests organized by United Ossetia against the ruling being held outside the court.
