= Kokoity Fandarast =

Political campaign in South Ossetia

Kokoity Fændarast (Ossetian: Kокойты Фæндaрacт) was a political campaign launched by The Salvation Union of South Ossetia, with a declared goal "of getting rid of Eduard Kokoity," the former secessionist South Ossetian leader.

Kokoity Fandarast ("Fandarast"- meaning "Godspeed" in Ossetian) campaign was founded in August 2007. According to its founders, the main aim of this campaign is to end the secessionist authorities of Eduard Kokoity, henceforth the name Kokoity Fandarast (Goodbye Kokoity).

The campaign was organized as a part of the broader "South Ossetian People For Peace" movement and included peaceful rallies in the Georgia-controlled parts of South Ossetia (Tamarasheni, Eredvi, Liakhvi) and rest of Georgia. Headed by the Ossetian journalist Vladimir Sanakoev, the campaign also called for unity between ethnic Ossetians and Georgians in South Ossetia. "Kokoity is a murderer of South Ossetia's future", claimed Vladimir Sanakoev, "and we will not stop our peaceful actions until we reach our goal". The Kokoity Fandarast musical video which is composed on Ossetian traditional song "Simdi" was performed by Ossetian and Georgian artists. The music video aired on "Alania" television, the Tbilisi-based station targeting audiences in breakaway South Ossetia.

Eduard Kokoity has denounced the ethnic Ossetians involved in the movement as "traitors" and accused the Georgian authorities of staging the campaign in an effort to undermine his government. Georgian-backed Ossetian political forces opposed to South Ossetian independence from Georgia have launched this campaign with the goal of getting rid of Kokoity, yet at the same time they also welcome the involvement of Kokoity's envoys in the negotiations to determine South Ossetia's final status and this was criticized as it put to question how welcome the involvement would be.
