= Inal Tasoev (politician) =

South Ossetian politician

South Ossetian Ombudsman for Human Rights
- Incumbent
- Assumed office 2012
- Preceded by: David Sanakoev

Inal Tasoev is an Ossetian politician from the partially recognized Caucasian Republic of South Ossetia, which most of the United Nations recognizes as part of Georgia, occupied by Russia. Tasoev has served on the executive of three presidents, Leonid Tibilov, Anatoly Bibilov, and Alan Gagloev as "Ombudsman" for Human Rights. (Note: The office of "Ombudsman of Human Rights" is used interchangeably with "Commissioner of Human Rights" and "Presidential Representative on Human Rights" in South Ossetia)

== Political career ==
Tasoev was appointed Ombudsman for Human Rights in South Ossetia by Leonid Tibilov, retaining his seat during a transfer of power with the election of Anatoly Bibilov and later Alan Gagloev. Tasoev, and the office of Ombudsman, has been criticized by the South Ossetian opposition due to it being an appointed political position, instead of an independent judicial position. Despite this Tasoev claims to be independent in his decisions and that he does not need to report to state bodies in his decisions.

Shortly after his appointment in 2012 Tasoev announced that he did not have adequate power or real leverage over the government to secure the protection of human rights. Tasoev is a regular member of the South Ossetian delegation to the Geneva International Discussions.

In 2013 Tasoev denounced Freedom House for listing South Ossetia as a "restricted state" in their 2012 "Freedom in the World" rankings, stating that their ranking was "prejudiced" and based on "outdated information." At the same time Tasoev praised South Ossetia's inclusion on the list, claiming it was a sign of Freedom House recognizing South Ossetia as independent.

Tasoev was criticized in 2018 for refusing to comment on a police brutality case where a South Ossetian police officer assaulted several restaurant-goers on the suspicion of dining at the same time as an escaped convict.

In 2020 Tasoev, alongside minister of culture Zhanna Zasseeva, attempted to negotiate with protesters following the Murder of Inal Djabiev, however, was rebuffed by the protesters who said that their condition of the removal of prosecutor general Uruzhmag Dzhagaev was unconditional.

In 2022 Tasoev announced the government of South Ossetia's decision to ban all properties of Meta Platforms (Note: Namely Facebook and Instagram) in South Ossetia as the "people's right to reliable information" claiming that Meta was a "combat tool" of Ukraine and the West against Russia, and that Meta was violating the human rights of Ossetians for spreading "false information." This came after Meta integrated fact-checking on their platforms, with Russian officials frequently being flagged as spreading false information.

Also in 2022 Tasoev denounced the International Criminal Court, calling it an "obedient instrument in the hands of the West" after three South Ossetians where charged with war crimes and crimes against humanity for their role in the Russo-Georgian war. These included: Tasoev's predecessor David Sanakoev, Minister of Internal Affairs Mikhail Mindzaev, and the head of the Tskhinvali prison, Hamlet Guchmazov.

In 2024 Tasoev denounced the European Court of Human Rights for having "double standards" and for putting "pressure on Russia" as well as for dismissing lawsuits filed by South Ossetians during the 2008 Russo-Georgian war.
