= Igor Giorgadze =

Georgian politician (born 1950)

Igor Panteleimonovich Giorgadze (Georgian: იგორ პანტელეიმონის გიორგაძე; born 23 July 1950) is a Georgian politician-in-exile, a former Minister of State Security (1993–1995).

== Early life ==
Giorgadze was born in Zaisan, a city on the Soviet-Chinese border in what is now eastern Kazakhstan. His father General Panteleimon Giorgadze, a World War II veteran and the former head of United Communist Party of Georgia, wanted his son to receive military education. In 1968 Giorgadze got accepted at the prestigious Higher School of the USSR Committee for State Security (KGB) in Moscow. He graduated in 1973 with a degree in jurisprudence and foreign languages. Besides Georgian and Russian, he speaks Turkish and French as well as Serbo-Croatian and Azeri.

== Career ==
=== KGB officer (1973–1993) ===
Lieutenant-General Giorgadze held various posts with the security services of the Soviet Georgia. From 1980 to 1981 he also took part in combat operations in Afghanistan as a member of the KGB "Cascade" task group in the city of Kandahar. He has been awarded fifteen government decorations, including the "For Merit in Combat" medal and holds the title of "Honorary Officer of the KGB of the USSR".

=== Minister of State Security (1993–1995) ===
During the 1992-1993 civil war between the adherents of the first Georgian president Zviad Gamsakhurdia and his opponents, Igor Giorgadze sided with Eduard Shevardnadze and in 1993, was appointed the country's Minister of State Security. During his ministerial tenure Giorgadze actively promoted working relations with the special services of Turkey, Russia, the United States and grew in considerable influence in the Georgian government.

==== Political downfall (1995) ====
On 29 August 1995 there was an attempt on the life of the then president Shevardnadze, after which Giorgadze was removed from his post. On 4 September, Giorgadze left Georgia after giving a press conference where he announced his plans to move to Moscow. After leaving the country Giorgadze wrote an open letter to Shevardnadze where he called Shevardnadze's regime a "Mafia State". Soon after the letter the allegations implicating his involvement in the 29 August assassination attempt followed and warrants were sent to Interpol for Giorgadze's arrest. In 1997 there was a trial called the "Trial of the Century" where those accused of involvement with the assassination attempt against Shevardnadze were tried. With 13 defendants and 365 witnesses the prosecution was unable to link Giorgadze to the terrorist act as neither the defendants nor witnesses testified against him. Claims against Giorgadze remain unproven yet the charges have not been dropped. Giorgadze himself has always denied any involvement with the assassination attempt and accused the Georgian government of political persecution.

=== Opposition in exile (1995–present) ===
Following Giorgadze's exile, Giorgadze received support from Paul Manafort's partner Rick Davis, Oleg Deripaska, and Deripaska's very close supporter Nathaniel Rothchild.

In the 2000s, Giorgadze again attempted to enter Georgia's political arena. In July 2001 the "Samshoblo" ("Motherland") All-Georgia Patriotic Alliance was officially registered in Tbilisi. The organization, comprising nine parties and popular movements, elected Giorgadze its chairman.

In 2003 Giorgadze founded the political party "Samartlianoba" (Justice), and in 2005 he became the initiator of the political movement "Anti-Soros", an alliance of four opposition parties including Samartlianoba. The movement's name refers to the American billionaire George Soros. The party advocated closer economic and political ties with the Russian Federation and criticized the government for its pro-NATO course. However, Giorgadze's party enjoyed minimal support in Georgia, and has been accused of being funded by the Russian security services.

Despite being abroad, Giorgadze attempted to run for President of Georgia in the 2000 and 2004 elections, but on each occasion Georgia's Central Election Commission (CEC) refused to register him.

In May 2006, Deputy Prosecutor-General of Russia Vladimir Kolesnikov announced that Georgian terrorist suspect Igor Giorgadze would be given political asylum in Russia. In response, the Georgian Foreign Ministry protested to Russian ambassador Vladimir Chkhikvishvili.

==== 2006 Saakashvili's arrests ====
On 6 September 2006 Georgian police arrested over 30 members of the "Samartlianoba" party and its political groups in a round-up in the nation's capital Tbilisi and elsewhere in the country. The arrested were accused of plotting to organize a violent coup against the government of President Mikheil Saakashvili. Allegations also included receiving illegal funding from abroad and collaboration with the security services of a foreign country.

Georgian media quoted President Saakashvili as saying, "These people will receive what they deserve and their patrons and sponsors will see this. As far as I know hysteric attempts were underway [to plot a coup]. The wine embargo [by Russia] has failed to bring results, military provocations as well; so this kind of things [plotting coup] has been left on their disposal, but these attempts will not harm us if we are consolidated." The defendants, among whom was Giorgadze's niece Maia Topuria, were convicted and sentenced from four to eight years of imprisonment. Topuria's American legal council decried the decision to close the courtroom. and urged the government of Georgia to stop the political persecutions against the defendants. The trial was appealed in Strasbourg at the European Court of Human Rights.

==== Views and activity since 2018 ====
Giorgadze, residing in exile in Russia, published a set of documents in 2018 allegedly proving that the development of biological agents and unethical human experimentation were taking place at the Lugar Research Center near Tbilisi. President of Russia Vladimir Putin noted Giorgadze's allegations. Putin thus effectively greenlighted information war against Georgia and the United States. In November 2018, an investigation by BBC refuted Giorgadze's claims. In 2022, Igor Kirillov, Commander of the Troops of Radiological, Chemical and Biological Defence of the Russian Armed Forces, suggested the Lugar laboratory was responsible for the incursion of mosquitos into Russia and invoked Giorgadze in his accusation.

In February 2023, Giorgadze stated in an interview that he could not enter Russia until President Putin's approval because Boris Yeltsin was on the side of pro-American Eduard Shevardnadze; he resided in Serbia and the Middle East until Putin's presidency. Giorgadze praised Prime Minister of Georgia Irakli Garibashvili for resisting the "dictate" of America and claimed that before Garibashvili, Georgia had actually been governed by the Embassy of the United States. He labeled Georgia's former president Mikheil Saakashvili as "Satan" and called Ukraine's president Volodymyr Zelenskyy "Cocaine baron". Giorgadze claimed that Ukraine has been committing "genocide" against ethnic Russians since 2014 and that the "Satanic" West supported "Nazism". Giorgadze condemned the Georgian volunteers fighting on the side of Ukraine as "fascists". He further claimed that if Garibashvili's independent policies continued, 70%-75% of Georgia's population would vote for joining the Eurasian Union with Russia a year later.
