= Eduard Kokoity =

President of South Ossetia from 2001 to 2011

Eduard Kokoyty
- Кокойты Эдуард
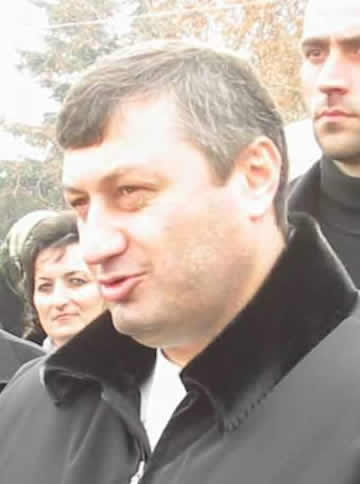
- Kokoity in 2009

2nd President of South Ossetia
- In office 18 December 2001 – 10 December 2011
- Prime Minister: Gerasim Khugayev; Igor Sanakoyev; Zurab Kokoyev (Acting); Yury Morozov; Boris Chochiev (Acting); Aslanbek Bulatsev; Vadim Brovtsev
- Preceded by: Lyudvig Chibirov
- Succeeded by: Vadim Brovtsev (Acting)

Personal details
- Born: 31 October 1964 (age 61) Tskhinvali, South Ossetian Autonomous Oblast, Georgian SSR, Soviet Union
- Party: Unity Party
- Spouse: Madina Tolparova

Eduard Dzhabeyevich Kokoyty (Iron Ossetic: Кокойты Джабейы фырт Эдуард, romanized: Kokojty Ĝabejy fyrt Edward; born 31 October 1964) is an Ossetian politician who served as the second president of South Ossetia of the partially recognized state of South Ossetia from 2001 to 2011.

== Early life ==
Eduard Kokoyty was born in Tskhinvali, in the Georgian SSR, a part of the Soviet Union at the time. He was a member, and champion, of the Soviet Union's national wrestling team. Prior to 1989, he was the First Secretary of the Tskhinvali branch of the Komsomol, the Young Communist League. He moved to Moscow in 1992, where he became a businessman, after learning about capitalism. In 2001, he moved back to South Ossetia.

== 2001 presidential election ==
Kokoyty was elected president, at the age of 38, with a majority in the presidential elections of November–December 2001. In the first round of the elections on 18 November 2001, he collected 45% of the vote, with Stanislav Kochiev collecting 24%, and incumbent Lyudvig Chibirov collecting 21%. In the Second and final round, he won 53% of the vote to Stanislav Kochiev's 40% on 6 December. Kokoyty assumed office on 18 December 2001.

Kokoyty's victory was unexpected and owed much to the support of the Tedeyev clan, one of South Ossetia's most powerful families. He had gained key support from Albert "Dik" Tedeyev and his brother Dzhambolat, also a champion wrestler, who organized and financed Kokoyty's election campaign. The clan had previously supported Lyudvig Chibirov, but broke off support for him after he attempted to move against them. After Kokoyty was elected president, members of the Tedeyev clan took over responsibility for the republic's customs service and for freight traffic along the Transcaucasian highway. Revenues from the highway provide much of the South Ossetian government's revenue.

In July 2003, Kokoyty moved against the Tedeyevs. Sacking Albert Tedeyev, the Secretary of the Security Council, and ordering their private militias to be disarmed. According to Kokoyty, the Security Council Secretary, along with the Defense and Security Chiefs had links with criminals. The affair prompted an outbreak of gunfire in Tskhinvali, but no casualties were reported.

== President ==
Kokoyty has taken a strong position against reunification with Georgia, although he has expressed a willingness to negotiate a peace settlement on the basis of South Ossetia being treated as an independent state (a precondition rejected by the Tbilisi government). Following a tense stand-off with the central Georgian government in July 2004, he claimed "Georgia wants war. But we are ready for self-defense." Prior to the 2006 presidential elections, he stated that the Georgian-Ossetian conflict was not an inter-ethnic, but clearly a political one caused by Georgia's desire to impose on Ossetians the norms of Western democracy which could not be superior to the Caucasian traditional laws. He has also criticized the Organization for Security and Co-operation in Europe mission in the region on several occasions, accusing the organization of bias and likening its activities to "[those] of Georgia's secret services".

He was reelected on 12 November 2006 following the 2006 presidential election. On the same day, Georgian-backed forces organized an alternative election in the territories controlled by Georgia or only loosely controlled by the South Ossetian government. Dmitry Sanakoyev, a former prime minister of South Ossetia, who was sacked by Kokoyty in 2001, was elected as a rival president.

On 10 December 2011, he resigned as President of South Ossetia. Prime Minister Vadim Brovtsev was acting president until the presidential election rerun on 25 March 2012. Eduard Kokoyty was constitutionally barred from serving a third term in office. Although attempts were made to call a referendum to change the constitution, this was blocked by the Supreme Court. Kokoyty himself stated he had no intention in seeking a third term, and called on everybody to refrain from initiatives to allow him to serve a third term. After multiple elections and several rounds of voting, Leonid Tibilov was elected president 8 April 2012.

=== Cabinet ===
Following in 2008, Kokoyty broke precedent and sacked almost the entire executive cabinet, except for the Foreign Ministry, the sole holdover.

Office	Name
Interior Minister	Valery Valiev
Minister for Trade and Industry	Teimuraz Chochiev
Minister for Youth, Sport and Tourism	Eleonora Gabaraeva
Healthcare Minister	Nugzar Gabaraev
Minister for Civil Defense and Emergency Situations	Anatoly Bibilov
Minister of Justice	Atsamaz Bichenov
Minister of Transport and Roads	Alan Kolyev
Minister of Communications	Giorgi Kabisov
Minister of Economic Development	Igor Bapiev
Minister for Management of State Assets	Sergey Parastaev
Minister for Natural Resources	Vitaly Dzeranov
Minister of Agriculture	Jambulat Kozaev
Minister of Culture	Tamerlan Dzudtsov
Minister for Press and Information	Irina Gagloeva
Minister of Foreign Affairs	Murat Jioev
Minister of Defense	Yuri Tanaev (Note: A citizen and resident of Russia, invited to South Ossetia to take up their post)
Chief of Administration	Alexander Bolshakov

== Controversy ==
On 11 September 2008 Kokoyty stated that independent South Ossetia would eventually become part of the Russian Federation, a claim that was quickly denied by Russian officials and shortly thereafter retracted by Kokoyty. Kokoyty is a Eurasianist and argues that South Ossetia never left the Russian Empire.

Since December 2008, Kokoyty's former allies have subjected him to heavy criticism in a series of interviews with the Russian media. Kokoyty's erstwhile insider and the Russia-based businessman Albert Dzhussoyev accused the Kokoyty administration of hijacking Russian funds meant for South Ossetia and claimed the region was on the brink of a "social catastrophe". Similar charges have been brought by South Ossetia's former defense minister Anatoly Barankevich and prime minister Yury Morozov. Barankevich further claimed that Kokoyty had fled Tskhinvali during the Russo-Georgian War and accused him of personally torturing a captured Georgian soldier. South Ossetia's former interior minister and chair of the supreme court, Alan Parastayev, told the Georgian Imedi TV that Kokoyty had organized a series of terrorist attacks and ordered murders for which he blamed Georgia. Representatives of the Kokoyty administration dismissed the allegations, claiming these allegations were part of a plot against Kokoyty.

On 3 March 2009, the Russian newspaper Kommersant reported that Kokoyty's administration and the Kremlin were at odds over the control of aid funds allocated from Russia's federal budget to South Ossetia and Tskhinvali was at the verge of "social explosion". In May 2009, Albert Dzhussoyev and Dzhabulat Tadeyev announced they would seek to organize early presidential elections in order to remove Kokoyty whom they accused of authoritarianism, corruption and being "unreliable" for Russia. The first attempt at organizing an Ossetian opposition rally in Moscow was dispersed by the Russian OMON.

In spring 2010, Kokoyty again received much criticism, mostly regarding the use of Russian aid. An opinion poll held by the International Center of Political Analysis (MTsPA) showed an approval rating for Kokoyty of 12.4%, with 66.3% of respondents having a negative opinion. Kosta Dzugaev, an advisor to Kokoyty, immediately blasted the poll as "lies", claiming the MTsPA had never actually done any research in South Ossetia. The MTsPA has been linked to Prime Minister Vadim Brovtsev, who is himself under attack for mismanaging Russian funds.

== See also ==
- Kokoity Fandarast

== Notes ==
Political offices
Preceded by Lyudvig Chibirov	President of South Ossetia; 2001–2011	Succeeded by Vadim Brovtsev; Acting
