= Proposed Russian annexation of Abkhazia =

Map showing all Russian-occupied territories in Europe before the 2022 Russian invasion of Ukraine. Russia is shown in light red while the dark red territories are, from left to right, Transnistria, Crimea, Donetsk, Luhansk, Abkhazia (number 2) and South Ossetia. One of them, Crimea, was annexed in 2014.

The Russian-backed and self-proclaimed Republic of Abkhazia emerged as a result of the War in Abkhazia and ethnic cleansing of Georgians in 1993. Following the Russo-Georgian War of 2008, Abkhazia gained control of all of its claimed territory and gained recognition by five countries, which includes Russia, Venezuela, Syria, Nauru, and Nicaragua. Since then, Russia maintains significant presence in Abkhazia, which remains heavily dependent on Russia. The growing Russian presence in the region has been criticized as Russian imperialism against Georgia. Georgia alleges that growing Russian presence already constitutes a de facto annexation. There have been several discussions about possible Russian annexation of the region.

== Background ==
Although Abkhazians are not ethnically related to Georgians, since the ancient times they formed part of Georgian cultural and political realm. Abkhazians, not having their own alphabet, used Georgian as the written language, and were part of the Georgian Orthodox Church. The ties between Georgians and Abkhazians were somehow weakened during the spread of Islam in the region in the sixteenth and the seventeenth centuries, but it never fully replaced Orthodox Christianity, and the Abkhazian elite remained influenced by the Georgian culture and traditions.

=== Russification ===
After the Russian annexation of Georgia, the Russian Empire pursued the Russification policies. Part of this policy was the attempt to deprive the Georgian language of the status of language of administration and the liturgy in the country. The Russian authorities also promoted the minority languages by creating separate alphabets for them and elementary textbooks, in particular in the cases of Mingrelian, Abkhaz, and Svan. The goal of this policy was not a linguistic preservation, but the creation of distinct identities for the separate groups in Georgia which would allow to assimiliate them more quickly into the Russian nation. The goal was to obviate the use of Georgian and its replacement with Russian as the language of literacy and high culture among these groups. It was understood that replacing Georgian, which had been used for centuries in the church education and liturgy in Abkhazia, with the Abkhaz was the first step towards a shift to the Russian. The languages of instruction became Abkhazian and Russian, and the Georgian was disallowed. The intent was to separate certain elements from the Georgian population and create separate nationalities for them with the final goal of Russification. The teaching of the Russian to the Abkhaz led eventually to the replacement of Georgian with the Russian as their second language, and gradually this led to the alienation of Abkhazians from Georgians, despite them being close historically and sharing elements of a common historical heritage. The Russian policy aimed at eradicating all signs that Abkhazia was part of Georgia and to assimiliate the Abkhazian population. It resulted in Abkhazians by large becoming Russian speakers, with a significant percentage not having a command of their own language. This led to the pro-Georgian orientation of Abkhazians being replaced by the pro-Russian orientation. The Russian Empire also had an important role in developing Abkhaz ethnic nationalism as a counterweight to Georgian nationalism, which included developing an Abkhaz alphabet based on Cyrillic script under Russian auspices.

=== Abkhazian secession from Georgia ===
Before 1989, Abkhazia had a population of which 45.7% were Georgians, 17.8% were Abkhazians, while the rest were other ethnicities (Armenians, Russians, etc.) according to the Soviet census. In 1992—1993, Abkhazia led by separatist leader Vladislav Ardzinba broke away from Georgia after the bloody war and ethnic cleansing of the Georgian population. Abkhazia established close ties with Russia, which led to the Russia's recognition in 2008.

=== Pro-Russian sentiments ===
In 2002, de facto Prime Minister of Abkhazia Anri Jergenia announced that 60% of Abkhazia's population acquired Russian citizenship. He told Russian news agency Interfax on 11 July that this proved that Abkhaz people were "eager for closer ties with Russia than with any other state". Georgia protested against Russia's citizenship law which allowed residents of former Soviet Union with no other citizenship to acquire Russian citizenship through simplified procedures, calling it a tool for "hidden annexation".

In 2023 de facto Abkhazian official Sergei Shamba has described Abkhazia as "part of the Russian world"

== History of proposals ==
=== Proposals during the Soviet Union ===
The Abkhaz Autonomous Soviet Socialist Republic unsuccessfully appealed in 1957, 1967, 1978 and 1988 to secede from Georgian Soviet Socialist Republic and join Russian Soviet Federative Socialist Republic. In 1988 and 1989, there was an appeal to change the status of the autonomous republic to the union republic within the Soviet Union.

=== 1993 proposal ===
On 18 November 1993, the de facto leader of Abkhazia Vladislav Ardzinba proposed to hold a referendum to join the Russian Federation. In an interview with Moskovskie Novosti, Ardzinba stated that Abkhazia was tied to Russia by "inseparable threads": it was "economically oriented toward the north" and formed part of what he described as the "single organism" of the North Caucasus. He also said that Abkhazia would not declare independence, citing the experiences of Nagorno-Karabakh and South Ossetia.

=== 1995 public proposal ===
On 16 April 1995, a mass public meeting was held in Sukhumi devoted to the "185th anniversary of the voluntary entry of Abkhazia into Russia". A resolution was adopted at the meeting, calling for Abkhazia's "reunion with Russia".

=== 2001 proposal ===
In 2001, Abkhazian de facto Prime Minister Anri Jergenia said that Abkhazia was preparing to join Russia and that it was going to hold a referendum on that issue.

=== 2002–2006 proposals on association ===
On 28 February 2002, the de facto leaders of Abkhazia stated that they were intensifying efforts to seek an association with Russia. Abkhazia's political envoy to Russia, Igor Akhba said that Abkhazia was formalizing the documents to be submitted to Russia. The separatist authorities said that the move was in response to the announcement that the United States would provide military aid and deploy military trainers to Georgia as a part of the war on terror campaign to help Georgia against the suspected terrorists in Pankisi, which the separatists claimed could become a threat to them. The deployment caused concerns in Russia, with the Russian foreign minister Igor Ivanov claiming that the American deployment was "much larger than what Russians had been told", and the Georgia's ambassador to Russia Zurab Abashidze denouncing "hysteria in the Russian press", saying : "If our Russian colleagues are concerned about the situation in the Pankisi Gorge, why should they be concerned about American assistance?". Russian President Vladimir Putin did not comment on de facto Abkhazia's proposal, but said that Russia respected Georgia's territorial integrity. On 17 March 2003, the de facto Parliament of Abkhazia adopted a resolution, urging the Russian parliament to support the proposal. The de facto Prime Minister Gennadi Gagulia said that Abkhazia wanted "closer ties and integration with Russia". On 16 October 2004, the de facto parliament appealed to Russian President Vladimir Putin, proposing to sign an association agreement which would establish a coordinated foreign policy, grant Russia right to deploy the military bases to Abkhazia, and join Abkhazia to a monetary and custums union with Russia. On 17 August 2005, de facto President of Abkhazia Sergei Bagapsh said that Abkhazia was working on "associated membership" into the Russian Federation by synchronizing Abkhazia's legislation with that of Russia. In October 2005, Abkhazia was admitted to the Southern Russian Parliamentary Association, which includes the parliaments of all constituent entities of Russia's Southern Federal District, with the exception of Chechnya. Abkhazia was granted the status of an "associate member," which allowed it to participate in discussions on various issues. On 15 February 2006, Bagapsh said that Georgia was "mistaken" to think that Abkhazia was going to stop its integration with Russia, with Abkhazia continuing making its laws similar to Russian ones and integrating economically with Russia.

=== 2008 proposal to join the Union State ===
On 26 August 2008, Russia recognized the independence of Abkhazia and South Ossetia following the Russo-Georgian War. On 28 August 2008, de facto President of Abkhazia Sergei Bagapsh stated that Abkhazia had "no plans" to join Russia. A similar statement was made on 12 September by Bagapsh and de facto president of South Ossetia Eduard Kokoity. At the same time, Bagapsh voiced Abkhazia's aspirations to join the Russia-Belarus Union State and Commonwealth of Independent States. Georgian analyst Gia Khukhashvili called this a "tactic dictated by Russia" because Russia was "trying to rescue its image in the eyes of the international community and escape the accusations of the occupation and annexation of Georgian territory". He also said that despite this formal refusal to join Russia, Abkhazia and South Ossetia would try to enter Union State and CIS, as he claimed that Russia would attempt to build "a new USSR-like union of satellite countries". Russian Foreign Ministry named Belarus among the countries which would recognize Abkhazia and South Ossetia, and Belarusian President Alexander Lukashenko promised to look into the issue on 28 September.

=== 2022 proposal to join the Union State ===
On 31 March 2022, de facto leader of South Ossetia Anatoly Bibilov announced that South Ossetia was planning to hold a referendum on joining Russia. In response, de facto Abkhaz officials stated that they supported South Ossetia's aspirations, but did not share its goals of joining Russia.

In October 2022, in an interview to the Izvestia, de facto President of Abkhazia Aslan Bzhania declared Abkhazia's readiness to host a Russian navy and join the Union State. However, the proposal has been described as impractical since Belarus has not recognized Abkhazia as a sovereign state and considers it to be part of Georgia.

=== 2023 statement by Dmitry Medvedev ===
In August 2023, Deputy Chair of Russian Security Council Dmitry Medvedev accused Georgia of escalating tensions by its potential membership to the NATO, threatening to annex Georgia's Abkhazia and South Ossetia.

== See also ==
- Proposed Russian annexation of South Ossetia
- Proposed Russian annexation of Transnistria
- Russian-occupied territories
- Russian annexation of Donetsk, Kherson, Luhansk and Zaporizhzhia oblasts
- 2014 Russian annexation of Crimea
