= Proposed Russian annexation of South Ossetia =

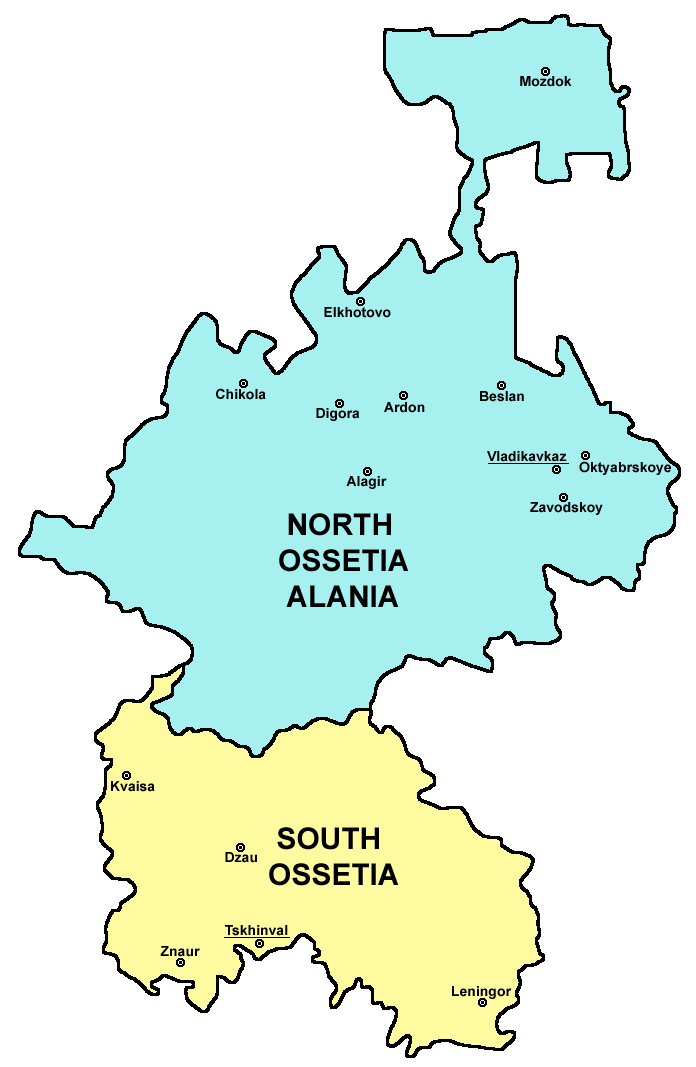
Map of the ethnolinguistic region of Ossetia, divided into North Ossetia, which is part of Russia, and South Ossetia, a largely unrecognized breakaway state separated from Georgia.

South Ossetia is a partially recognized and Russian-occupied separatist state internationally recognized as part of Georgia. It is mainly inhabited by Ossetians, an ethnic group also dominant in North Ossetia, which is part of Russia. South Ossetia separated itself from Georgia following the 1991–1992 South Ossetia War with the help of Russia, remaining ever since as a state closely allied with this country.

South Ossetia is heavily dependent on Russia, and due to this and the fact that North Ossetia is already part of the Russian Federation, it has been proposed that both regions be united under Russian rule. In 1992, a referendum which was to decide whether South Ossetia should stay as a part of Georgia following the dissolution of the Soviet Union was held. This referendum also asked if South Ossetia should join Russia, and it was approved by an overwhelming majority of the voters. Posteriorly, during the 2010s, Leonid Tibilov and Anatoly Bibilov, important South Ossetian political figures, both of whom have held the post of President of South Ossetia, recurrently spoke of the possibility of unifying both halves of Ossetia through a new referendum on annexation by Russia. However, these proposals were never carried out.

In 2022, Bibilov said that legal action was being undertaken, referring to the preparation of another referendum, for joining South Ossetia into Russia. North Ossetia expressed itself in favour of this, and Russian authorities stated that they respected the desire of the South Ossetian people. However, Georgia opposed this, describing this idea as unacceptable. This referendum was to happen after the 2022 South Ossetian presidential election, in which Bibilov was not re-elected, with Alan Gagloev taking his office instead. Gagloev showed less interest in unification with Russia than his opponent, but still supported the idea. On 13 May, Bibilov, still as incumbent president, announced that a referendum for the annexation of South Ossetia into Russia would take place on 17 July, in 2022; days later, on 30 May, Gagloev said the referendum would be suspended until consultations had been made with Russia.

Discussion about Abkhazia being annexed by Russia has also been made as a consequence of South Ossetia's ambitions. Analysts have often discussed both regions together, as Abkhazia is also a partially recognized state that broke off from Georgia with Russia's help, to which it remains dependent as well. However, Abkhazia is more independent from Russia, and has rejected South Ossetia's "Ossetianization" approach in regards to this country as some have described it. Abkhazia has expressed its intention to remain an independent state from Russia, although it has also declared support for South Ossetia's intention to unite with its northern counterpart in this country.

== Background ==
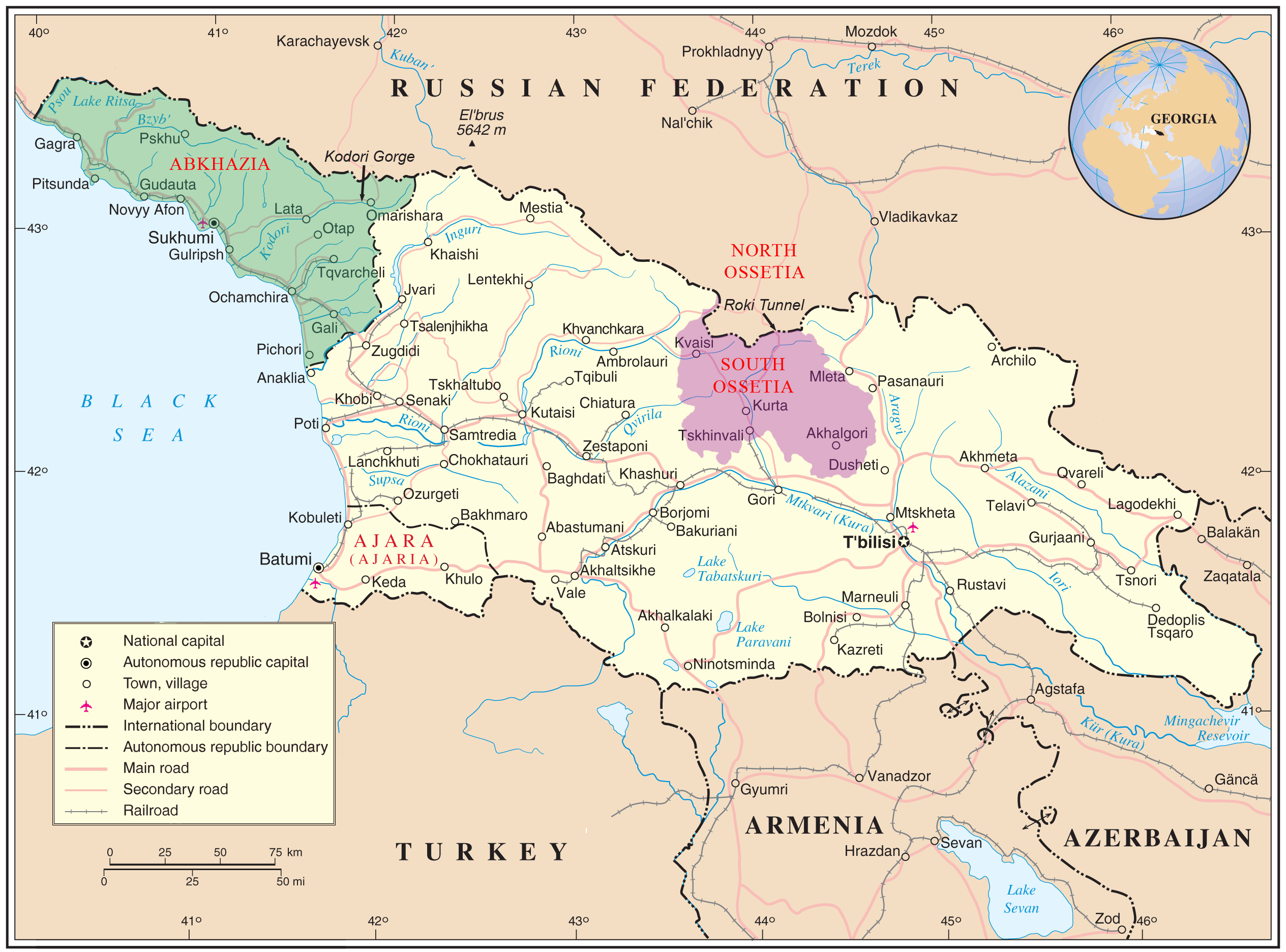
Map of Georgia including the Russian-occupied breakaway republics of Abkhazia and South Ossetia

South Ossetia is a small partially recognized and Russian-occupied breakaway state in the Caucasus region with about 40,000 to 60,000 inhabitants, whose population, after the ethnic cleansing of Georgians, consists predominantly of Ossetians. This ethnic group also inhabits North Ossetia, which currently is a republic of Russia. South Ossetia split off from Georgia following the dissolution of the Soviet Union, which marked the start of the Georgian–Ossetian conflict and the Abkhaz–Georgian conflict as well. Their initial phases, the 1991–1992 South Ossetia War and the 1992–1993 Abkhazia War, made Abkhazia and South Ossetia Russia-backed de facto independent countries although internationally recognized as part of Georgia. Nevertheless, in 2008, the Russo-Georgian War broke out. Russia aided Abkhazia and South Ossetia against Georgia and recognized their independence. Ever since, both states have been heavily dependent on Russia. However, in contrast to Abkhazia, which has sought closer relations with the rest of the world, South Ossetia has remained more isolated, focusing mainly on its relationship with Russia. This was referred to as "Ossetianization" in 2019 by the British journalist and writer Thomas de Waal.

== History ==
=== 1992 South Ossetian independence referendum ===
In 1992, a referendum on the independence of South Ossetia was held. A question on whether South Ossetia should join Russia was also included. The referendum was approved by an overwhelming majority of the voters; only 57 of the 53,441 votes were against these prospects.

=== 2010s proposals ===
In April 2012, after his victory in the 2012 South Ossetian presidential election, the newly elected President of South Ossetia Leonid Tibilov promised that he would keep developing South Ossetia's relationship with Russia and that his goal was "to make the long-standing dream of a united North and South Ossetia come true".

In January 2014, some months before the 2014 South Ossetian parliamentary election that was to be held on June of that year, prominent South Ossetian politician Anatoly Bibilov proposed the organization of a new referendum to unite Russia's North Ossetia and South Ossetia. He criticized the planned Treaty on Union Relations and Integration between Russia and South Ossetia for not pretending as much integration with Russia as he desired.

On 19 October 2015, during a meeting with the Russian politician Vladislav Surkov, Tibilov stated that another referendum on annexing South Ossetia into Russia could be made in the future. It is possible that he chose this moment to propose it as the international community was at the time focused on the Syrian civil war, meaning that his proposal would cause less scandal than the one the Russian annexation of Crimea did back in 2014.

In April 2016, the proposal resurfaced, as Tibliov said that a referendum to change the Constitution of South Ossetia in order to make it possible for the South Ossetian leadership to ask for the region's incorporation into Russia in the future was planned to take place before August that year. The part of the constitution would be more specifically the 10th article, which stated that the republic was free to enter in alliances with other countries and to hand over part of its powers to said alliances. Had it been changed, the President of South Ossetia could have legally asked for Russia to annex the country once given approval by the Parliament of South Ossetia. However, on May of that year, Tibilov and Bibilov, then the speaker of the South Ossetian parliament, issued a joint statement saying that such a referendum would only take place in 2017, following the 2017 South Ossetian presidential election.

In 2017, Bibilov, now as the President of South Ossetia after his victory on the 2017 election, said that while there was still intention from his part to hold a referendum on joining Russia in South Ossetia, there were still possibilities of postponing it.

=== 2022 proposal ===
On 30 March 2022, on a televised address, Bibilov, still as president of South Ossetia, said that the republic would take legal steps to prepare to join the Russian Federation. He stated that "I believe that unification with Russia is our strategic goal, our path, the aspiration of the people" and that Russia is South Ossetia's "historical homeland". He later clarified to Russian journalist Vladimir Solovyov that what he meant was organizing another referendum, which could be held after 10 April, the day of the 2022 South Ossetian presidential election. All this came after South Ossetia sent soldiers from the Russian military base in Tskhinvali, the South Ossetian capital, to assist Russia on its invasion of Ukraine. Many of these refused to fight and returned to South Ossetia, and the decision of sending soldiers to Ukraine was also not well received in South Ossetia itself, which put pressure over Bibilov in regards to the then incoming election.

Relevant political figures in North Ossetia were highly receptive of the possibility of South Ossetia joining Russia. Bibilov, posteriorly to his 30 March address, stated that North Ossetia and South Ossetia could unite and become one single Ossetia in the case that the latter was annexed by Russia. Sergey Menyaylo, Head of North Ossetia, expressed himself in favour of an Ossetian unification, and so did Vitaly Cheldiev, deputy of the Parliament of North Ossetia. Dmitry Peskov, the Kremlin Press Secretary (that is, the spokesperson of the Presidential Administration of Russia), also commented on the issue, declaring that while "no legal or any other action has been taken in this respect", "we treat the expression of the opinion of the people of South Ossetia with respect". On the other hand, in Georgia, this idea was strongly rejected. The Minister of Foreign Affairs of Georgia, David Zalkaliani, stated that "it is unacceptable to talk about a referendum when this territory is occupied by Russia". Beka Davituliani, a member of the Parliament of Georgia from the then ruling political party Georgian Dream, stated that South Ossetia's calls for a referendum were a provocation.

On 8 May, the second round of the 2022 South Ossetian presidential election took place, and Bibilov was defeated by Alan Gagloev. Gagloev had been regarded by observers as less supportive of the idea of holding a referendum to join Russia, saying that Russia at the time was "still busy with other issues, I think with more serious ones". He also said that the initiative had not been properly organized with Russia and that such a one-sided move could "discredit Russia's image in South Ossetia". Still, Gagloev stated that a referendum would still be held after having been elected. He said that it would happen "as soon as the right time comes" and declared that "South Ossetia has been and is ready today to join the Russian Federation". Later, on 13 May, Bibilov, still as incumbent president, announced that a referendum on merging South Ossetia into Russia would take place on 17 July 2022. However, on 30 May, Gagloev said the referendum would be suspended until consultations with Russia were complete.

=== 2026 alliance treaty ===
On 9 May 2026, Gagloev and President of Russia Vladimir Putin signed a "Treaty on Deepening Allied Cooperation between the Russian Federation and the Republic of South Ossetia". The terms of the treaty oversaw deeper cooperation between Russia and South Ossetia "to ensure regional peace and stability, and to pursue co-ordinated foreign, defence and security policies", and would take "further steps towards creating a unified economic space, improving living standards, and gradually introducing a common framework for foreign borrowing and foreign investment". The treaty was ratified by Russia's State Duma (lower house of the parliament) on 13 May.

Gagloev described the treaty as "a step towards the reunification of the Ossetian people", asserting that it would help create a legal framework for South Ossetia's future annexation by Russia. Caucasian independent media platform JAMnews stated that the treaty's terms suggested South Ossetia was moving towards de facto integration with Russia, even if full formal annexation still appeared unlikely in the approximate future amid the positive state of Georgian–Russian relations at the time. The Georgian foreign affairs minister Maka Botchorishvili condemned the treaty as being part of "further steps toward the annexation of Georgia's regions" by Russia.

== Parallels with Abkhazia ==
Due to their similar situation and history, Abkhazia and South Ossetia are often discussed together. This has led to worries that Abkhazia could also be annexed by Russia. However, Abkhazia is notably more independent from Russia than South Ossetia. In 2016, following South Ossetian announcements that a referendum would be organized to join Russia, the Prime Minister of Abkhazia Artur Mikvabia said that similar actions would not be taken by Abkhazia. Mikvabia stated that "we want to be an independent country and a reliable and loyal ally of great Russia" but that "we have a different situation" from South Ossetia, saying that South Ossetian motivations were largely based on the division of the Ossetian ethnicity between Russia and South Ossetia according to him, which was not the case of the Abkhazians. Abkhazia, more precisely the secretary of the Security Council of Abkhazia Sergei Shamba, also responded to the 2022 South Ossetian calls for a referendum on annexation by Russia, expressing Abkhazia's support for Ossetian unification within the Russian state but stating that the Abkhazian population and political elite preferred independence.

== See also ==
- Russia–South Ossetia relations
- Proposed Russian annexation of Abkhazia
- Proposed Russian annexation of Transnistria
- Territorial evolution of Russia
- Russian annexation of Donetsk, Kherson, Luhansk and Zaporizhzhia oblasts
- Russian irredentism
  - "Near abroad"
  - Russian-occupied territories
