= Russia–South Ossetia relations =

Bilateral diplomatic relations

- South Ossetia: Russia

Russia–South Ossetia relations refers to the bilateral relationship between Russia and the Republic of South Ossetia, a disputed region in the South Caucasus, located on the territory of the South Ossetian Autonomous Oblast within the former Georgian Soviet Socialist Republic.

== Background ==
South Ossetia declared its independence from Georgia in 1991 during the Georgian–Ossetian conflict, but the entity is recognised by only 5 UN recognised states. In the aftermath of the conflict Russia extended citizenship to many of South Ossetia's citizens.

Following several months of increased tensions in the region, on the night of 7 to 8 August 2008, the Georgian military launched an offensive on Tskhinvali, the South Ossetian capital. The leader of Georgian peacekeepers in South Ossetia said the purpose was to restore constitutional order in the region. The majority of the inhabitants of South Ossetia hold Russian citizenship, and Russia citing Chapter VII Article 51 of the United Nations Charter sent troops into South Ossetia through the Roki Tunnel in the morning of 8 August. Russian president Dmitry Medvedev, in noting the deaths of Russian peacekeepers and South Ossetian civilians, stated: "In accordance with the Constitution and the federal laws, as President of the Russian Federation it is my duty to protect the lives and dignity of Russian citizens wherever they may be." After five days of fighting, on 12 August French president Nicolas Sarkozy brokered a ceasefire agreement. Under the terms of the agreement, Russia agreed to withdraw from security zones in Georgia proper by 10 October. Russia completed the withdrawal on 8 October 2008.

=== Russian recognition of South Ossetia ===
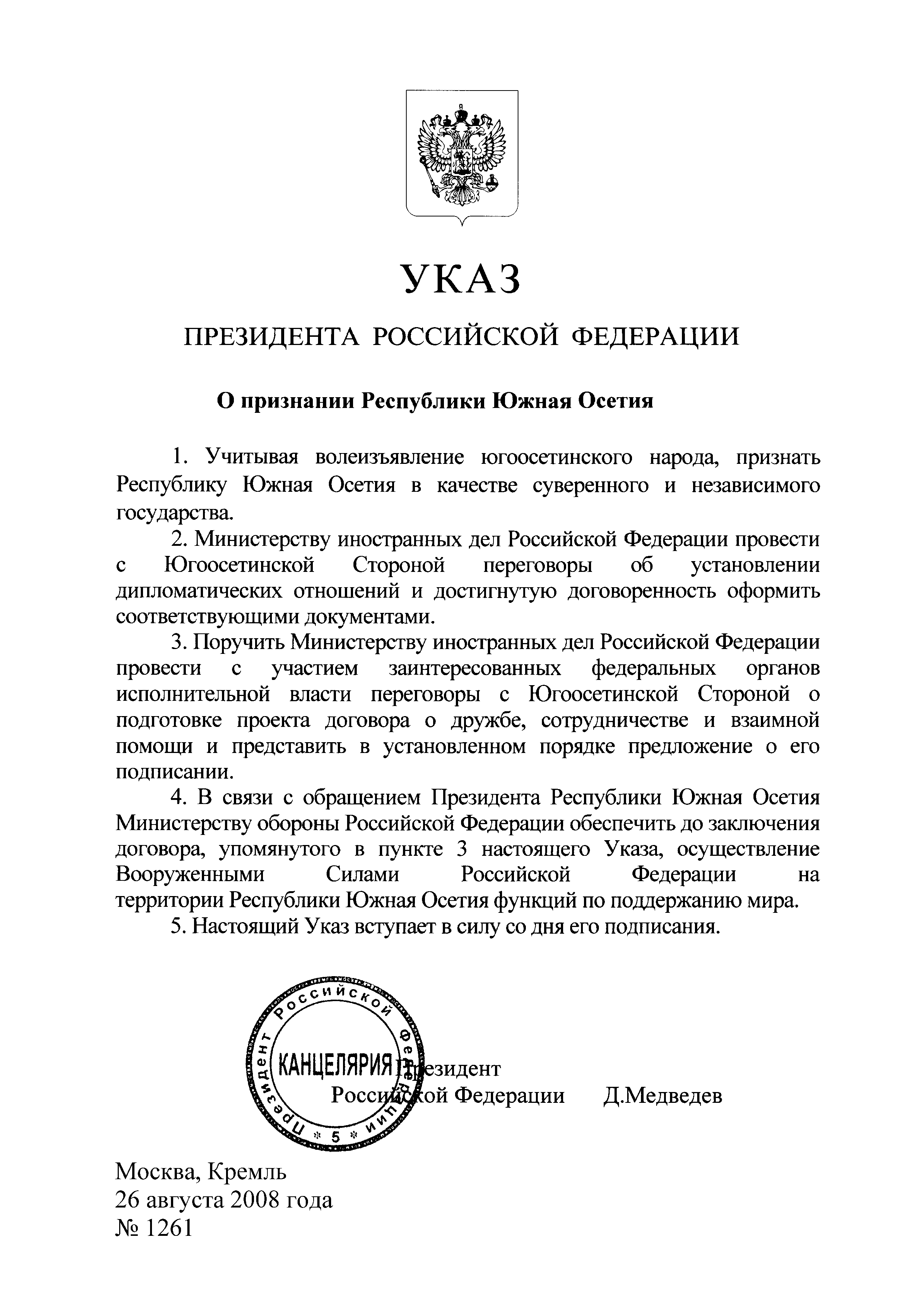
Presidential Decree No. 1261, dated 26 August 2008, by President Dmitry Medvedev, recognising the independence of South Ossetia

President Medvedev announcing that he has signed decrees recognising independence of Abkhazia and South Ossetia (in Russian) Transcript in English.

On 21 August 2008, the same day as a similar event in Abkhazia, a rally was held in Tskhinvali at which the people of South Ossetia appealed to Russian president Dmitry Medvedev and the Russian Federal Assembly for official recognition of their independence as sovereign states. President of South Ossetia Eduard Kokoity flew to Moscow on 23 August 2008 to deliver South Ossetia's appeal in an address to the Federation Council. After hearing the appeals from both the Abkhazian and South Ossetian leadership, on 25 August 2008 the Federation Council and State Duma passed motions calling upon President Medvedev to recognise the independence of the two regions and to establish diplomatic relations with them.

On 26 August 2008, President Medvedev signed presidential decrees recognising the independence of Abkhazia and South Ossetia In his address to the Russian nation, Medvedev noted that he was guided by the provisions of the UN Charter, the 1970 Declaration on the Principles of International Law Governing Friendly Relations Between States, the CSCE Helsinki Final Act of 1975 and other fundamental international instruments in issuing the decree, and further stated, "(t)his is not an easy choice to make, but it represents the only possibility to save human lives." Eduard Kokoity described the Russian decision to recognise South Ossetian independence as "noble", and stated that it would contribute to stability in the entire South Caucasus region.

Many high level Russian politicians including Russian president Dmitry Medvedev, Prime Minister Vladimir Putin, Deputy Prime Minister Sergey Ivanov, Chairman of the State Duma Boris Gryzlov, Minister of Foreign Affairs Sergey Lavrov, Permanent Representative of Russia to the United Nations Vitaly Churkin and Permanent Representative of Russia to NATO Dmitry Rogozin, rejected the criticism, and have stated that Russian recognition of South Ossetia is irreversible. In an interview to Vesti in August 2009, Sergey Lavrov stated that Russian recognition of Abkhazia and South Ossetia was not planned when the 2008 war began.

As a result of the Russian recognition of Abkhazian and South Ossetian independence, Georgia severed diplomatic relations with Russia on 29 August 2008, and declared that it regards South Ossetia and Abkhazia as occupied territories.

== Bilateral relationship ==
=== Diplomatic ties ===
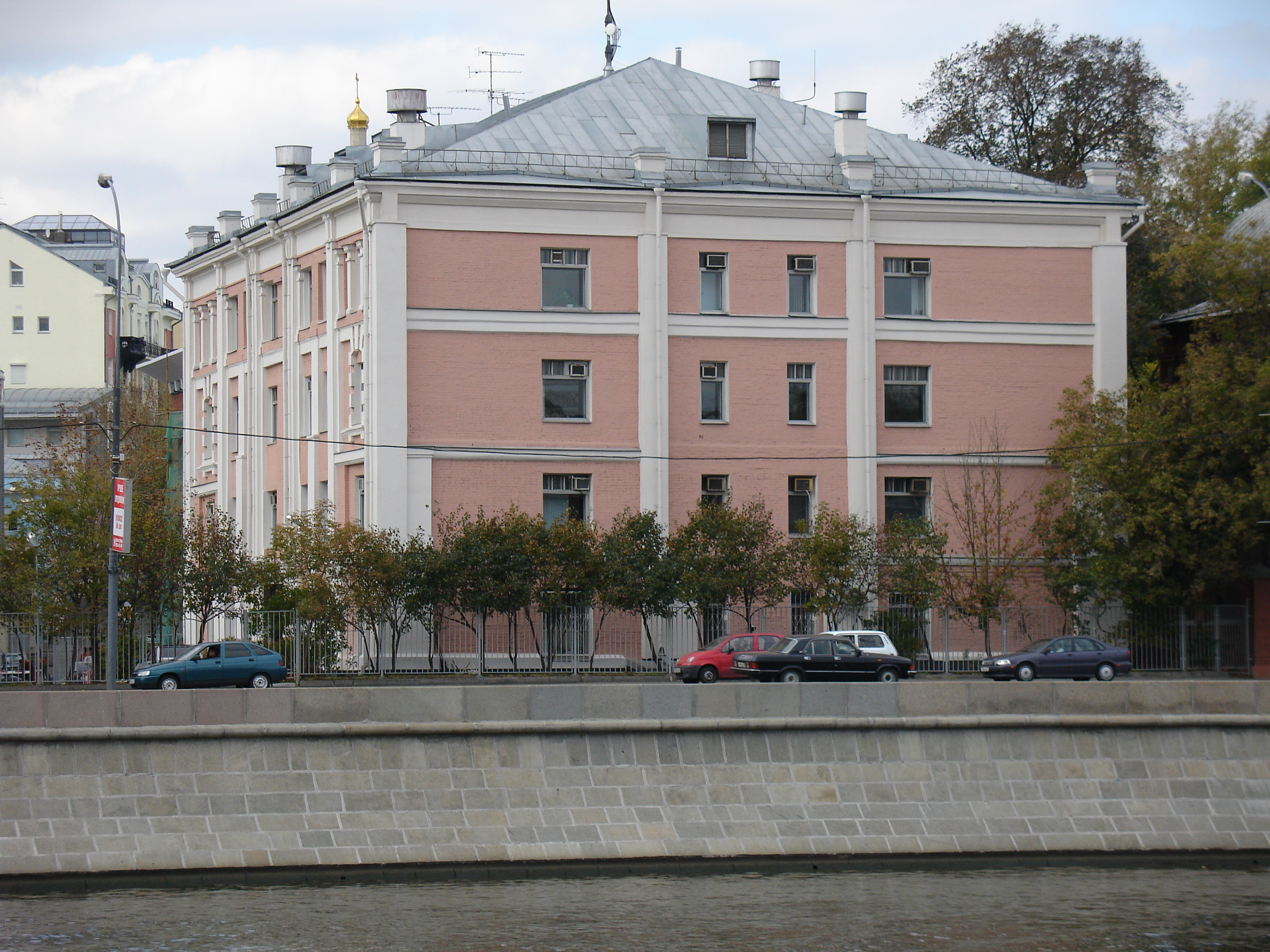
South Ossetian embassy in Moscow

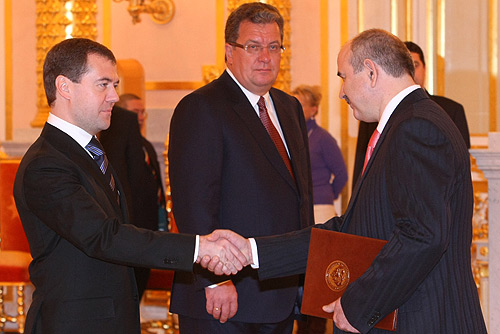
Dmitry Medoyev, the first South Ossetian ambassador to Russia, presents his Letters of Credence to President Medvedev on 16 January 2009.

Russia and South Ossetia established diplomatic relations on 9 September 2008, when Russian Foreign Minister Sergey Lavrov and South Ossetian Minister of Foreign Affairs Murat Dzhioyev exchanged notes at the Russian Foreign Ministry in Moscow.

On 25 September 2008, President Medvedev signed an ukaz appointing the first Russian Ambassador to South Ossetia, Elbrus Kargiyev, who presented his Letters of Credence to South Ossetian president Eduard Kokoity on 16 December 2008. Dmitry Medoyev, the plenipotentiary representative of the president of Republic of South Ossetia to Russia was appointed by Eduard Kokoity as South Ossetia's first ambassador to Russia on 13 January 2009. Medoyev presented his credentials to Russian president Dmitry Medvedev on 16 January 2009.

Russian prime minister Vladimir Putin issued a directive to set up a Russian embassy in South Ossetia in 2009.

=== Political ties ===
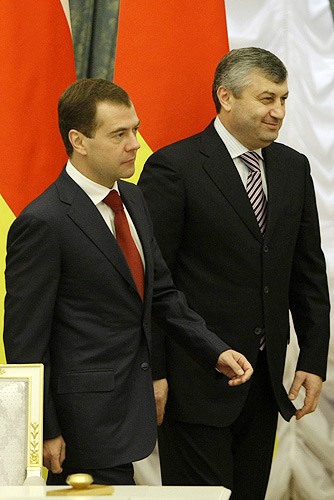
President Medvedev with President of South Ossetia Eduard Kokoity on 30 April 2009 after signing an agreement on joint efforts to protect the state border of the Republic of South Ossetia

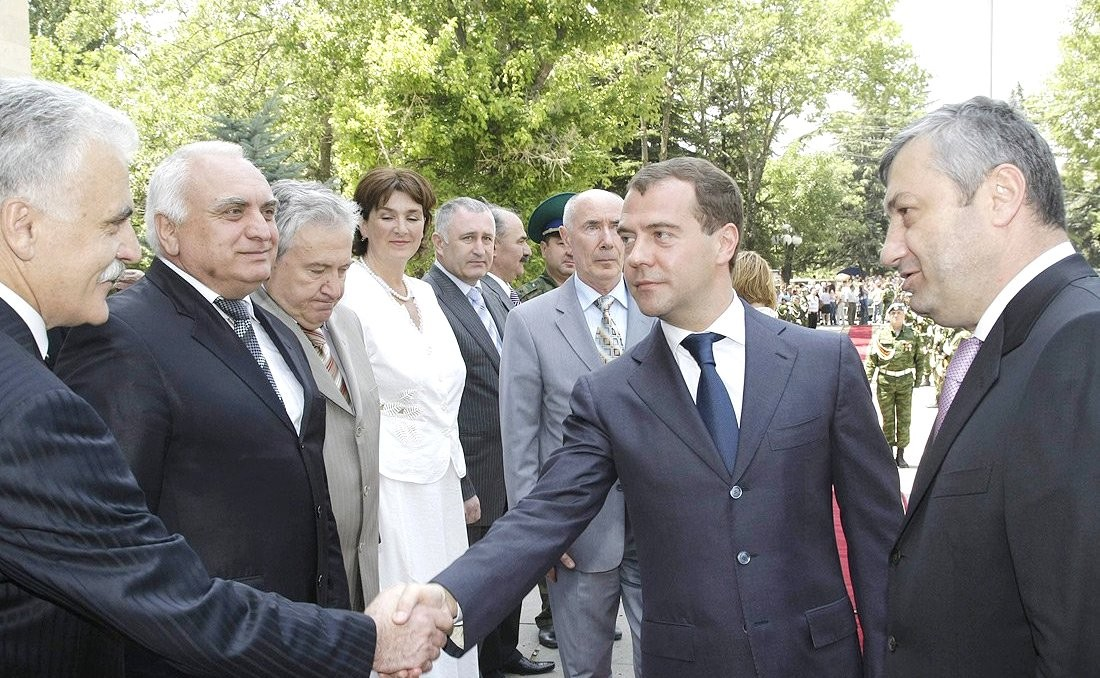
President Medvedev is introduced to members of the South Ossetian government by President Kokoity, during a working visit to Tskhinvali on 13 July 2009.

Eduard Kokoity said during talks with Russian president Dmitry Medvedev that it would become part of Russia within "several years", but later retracted the comments in an interview with Interfax and stated that he may have been misunderstood, and that South Ossetia would not give up its independence. Russian Minister of Foreign Affairs Sergey Lavrov, whilst in Warsaw, denied that South Ossetia would join the Russian Federation. Lavrov's position was also mirrored in August 2009 by Dmitry Medoyev, who stated that "South Ossetia will be building an independent state".

On 17 September 2008, Russia and South Ossetia signed a treaty of Friendship, Cooperation and Mutual Assistance at the Kremlin in Moscow. According to Eduard Kokoity sets out the long term basic objectives and principles in all areas for the strategic partnership between South Ossetia and Russia. In a statement after the signing of the treaty, President Medvedev warned Georgia that "another military adventure" would lead to a "regional catastrophe". The treaty was ratified by the State Duma on 29 October 2008.

In September 2008, United Russia and the Unity Party signed a strategic partnership in order to increase political cooperation between Russia and South Ossetia.

On 30 April 2009, Russia and South Ossetia concluded negotiations and signed a border protection treaty at the Kremlin, which would see Russian Border Guards patrolling and securing the South Ossetian borders, until such time as the South Ossetian government had set up its own service.

President Medvedev made a working visit to Tskhinvali on 13 July 2009, becoming the first Russian leader to visit South Ossetia. The visit, which was criticised by Georgia, saw Medvedev confirming that Russia would increase contacts with South Ossetia and would implement numerous projects to assist in the rebuilding effort in the Republic.

Following Medvedev's visit, Prosecutor General Yury Chaika, Emergencies Minister Sergey Shoygu and Minister of Internal Affairs Rashid Nurgaliyev travelled to South Ossetia on 21 July 2009, where they attended the opening of two rural police stations, and attended the signing of an interagency agreement between the two countries prosecutorial agencies.

On 7 August 2009, Dmitry Medvedev in an interview for the documentary In August 2008... stated that Russia would continue to develop bilateral ties with South Ossetia "regardless of whether somebody likes it or not."

=== Military ties ===
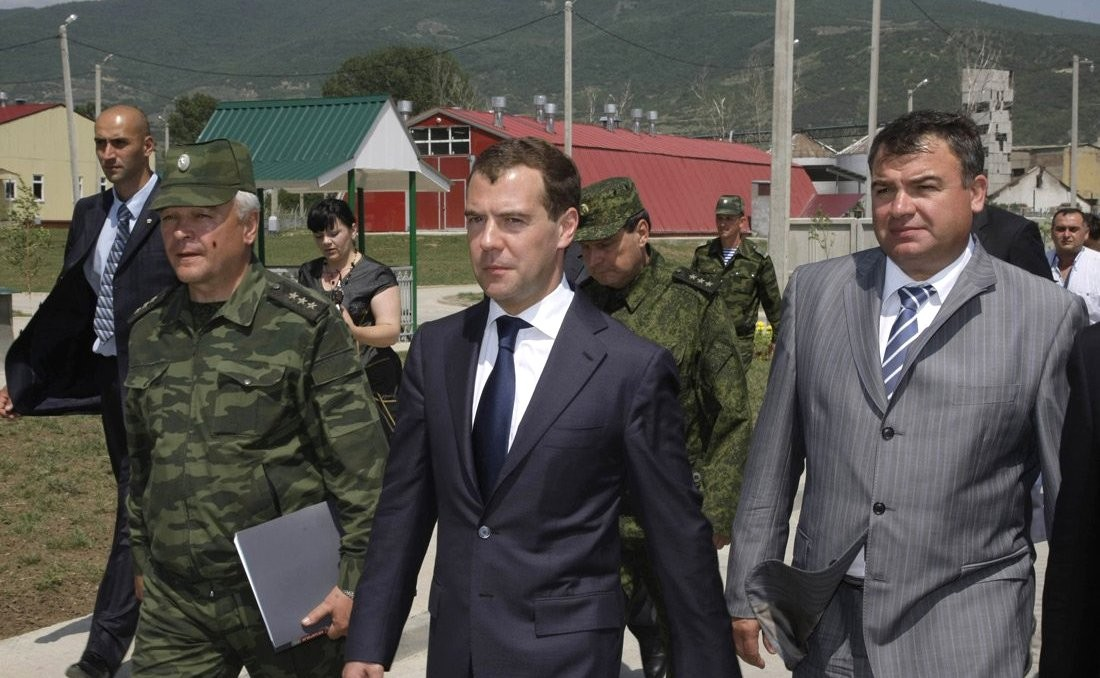
Medvedev with Sergey Makarov and Anatoly Serdyukov during a visit to the Russian military base in Tskhinvali on 13 July 2009

The Treaty of Friendship, Cooperation and Mutual Assistance which was signed in September 2008 came into force on 20 January 2009, and stipulates a Russian guarantee of military intervention in case South Ossetia should be attacked. Nikolay Makarov, the Chief of the General Staff of the Armed Forces of the Russian Federation, confirmed in November 2008 that the full complement of 3,700 Russian soldiers had been deployed to South Ossetia, in accordance with the mutual assistance treaty. After the signing of the 30 April treaty, Russian Border Guards were sent to South Ossetia and began patrolling the border with Georgia.

In June 2009, Makarov stated that it was likely that the Russian military presence in South Ossetia would be reduced, but that the development and staffing of the Russian military base near Tskhinvali would proceed as planned. In an August 2009 interview to RIA Novosti, Eduard Kokoity stated that he does not believe there is a need for an increase Russian military presence in South Ossetia, and that the Russian Border Guards have eased tensions in Georgian populated areas of the Republic.

The "alliance and integration" treaty signed between Russia and South Ossetia in March 2015 formally incorporated the South Ossetian military into the Russian Armed Forces.

=== Economic ties ===
Due to its small population and lack of natural resources, the economy of South Ossetia is entirely dependent on Russian finance and assistance, and it was formally integrated into the Russian economy by treaty in March 2015. After being instructed by Russian prime minister Vladimir Putin, in March 2009, Russia allocated 2.8 billion rubles from the Russian federal budget, as part of agreements between the Russian Ministry of Finance and its South Ossetian counterpart, which were based on the treaty signed in September 2008. Russia also allocated an additional 8.5 billion rubles to South Ossetia in order to assist in rebuilding housing, social amenities and utilities which were destroyed or damaged during the 2008 war. According to Eduard Kokoity, seventy percent of residential housing and eighty percent of administrative buildings in Tskhinvali were destroyed in the Georgian shelling of the city in 2008, but this could not be confirmed.

=== Plans of integration with the Russian Federation ===
Russian military bases in South Ossetia as of 2015

On 30 August 2008, Tarzan Kokoity, the Deputy Speaker of South Ossetia's parliament, announced that the region would soon be absorbed into Russia, so that South and North Ossetians could live together in one united Russian state. Russian and South Ossetian forces began giving residents in Akhalgori, the biggest town in the predominantly ethnic Georgian eastern part of South Ossetia, the choice of accepting Russian citizenship or leaving. However, Eduard Kokoity, the then president of South Ossetia, later stated that South Ossetia would not forgo its independence by joining Russia: "We are not going to say no to our independence, which has been achieved at the expense of many lives; South Ossetia has no plans to join Russia." Civil Georgia has said that this statement contradicts previous ones made by Kokoity earlier that day, when he indicated that South Ossetia would join North Ossetia in the Russian Federation.

The South Ossetian and Russian presidents signed an "alliance and integration" treaty on 18 March 2015. The agreement includes provisions to incorporate the South Ossetian military into Russia's armed forces, integrate the customs service of South Ossetia into that of Russia's, and commit Russia to paying state worker salaries in South Ossetia at rates equal to those in the North Caucasus Federal District. The Associated Press described the treaty as calling for "nearly full integration" and compared it to a 2014 agreement between Russia and Abkhazia. The Georgian Foreign Ministry described the signing of the treaty as "actual annexation" of the disputed region by Russia, and the United States and European Union said they would not recognise it.

In another move towards integration with the Russian Federation, South Ossetian president Leonid Tibilov proposed in December 2015 a name change to "South Ossetia–Alania" — in analogy with "North Ossetia–Alania", a Russian federal subject. Tibilov furthermore suggested holding a referendum on joining the Russian Federation prior to April 2017, which would lead to a united "Ossetia–Alania". In April 2016, Tibilov said he intended to hold the referendum before August of that year. However, on 30 May, Tibilov postponed the referendum until after the presidential election due in April 2017. At the name change referendum, nearly 80 percent of those who voted endorsed the name change.

On 30 March 2022, President Anatoly Bibilov announced his intention to begin legal proceedings in the near future to integration with the Russian Federation.

On May 9, 2026, President Alan Gagloev signed the "Treaty on the Deepening of Allied Interaction between the Russian Federation and the Republic of South Ossetia" with Russian president Vladimir Putin on a state visit to Moscow. The terms of the treaty oversees deeper co-operation between Russia and South Ossetia “to ensure regional peace and stability, and to pursue co-ordinated foreign, defence and security policies” and will take “further steps towards creating a unified economic space, improving living standards, and gradually introducing a common framework for foreign borrowing and foreign investment.” Gagloev described the treaty as “a step towards the reunification of the Ossetian people” stating it would help create a legal framework for South Ossetia's future ascension into the Russian federation. The treaty was ratified by the Russian parliament on May 13. Georgia’s Foreign Minister Maka Botchorishvili condemned the treaty as "further steps toward the annexation of Georgia’s regions."

== See also ==
- Foreign relations of Russia
- Foreign relations of South Ossetia
- International recognition of Abkhazia and South Ossetia
