= Controversy over Abkhaz and South Ossetian independence =

The unilateral declarations of independence of Abkhazia and South Ossetia remain controversial, as these entities are only recognized by a few countries after Russia issued its recognition shortly after the 2008 Russo-Georgian War. Other countries recognize the regions as part of Georgia. Russia's recognition occurred six months after the Western recognition of the unilateral declaration of independence by Serbia's breakaway Republic of Kosovo in February 2008, which was opposed by Russia. This, and resultant non-recognition of Abkhazia and South Ossetia by the West, has led to claims of hypocrisy and double standards on the part of both sides of the recognition divide. However, the recognition of Kosovo was based on recommendations of the UN and followed the principle of "standards before status", unlike in the case of Abkhazia and South Ossetia.

== Legitimacy under international law ==
Georgia restored its independence in 1991 on the basis of the principle of state continuity, asserting that the newly independent state was the legal successor of the Georgian Democratic Republic (1918–1921), of which Abkhazia had formed a part under the 1921 Constitution. The international community, including the United Nations and the UN Security Council, recognized Georgia's territorial integrity. Prior to the 2008 Russo-Georgian War, no UN member state, including Russia, recognized Abkhazia or South Ossetia as independent states. Under the principle of uti possidetis juris, Abkhazia and South Ossetia did not possess a right to independence. The principle was developed to ensure that the independence and stability of newly independent states would not be undermined by fratricidal conflicts over borders. During the dissolution of the Soviet Union, it did not extend a right of external self-determination to the subnational entities of the constituent Soviet republics. Both Abkhazia and South Ossetia held the status of autonomous entities within Georgia.

The Abkhazians are ethnically, linguistically, and culturally distinct from the Georgians and are related to the peoples of the North Caucasus in Russia. They may constitute a "people" for the purposes of exercising the right to self-determination, but this does not automatically grant them a right to external self-determination. One of the proposed doctrines justifying external self-determination is remedial secession, although its status under international law remains contested. Under this doctrine, a right to external self-determination may arise for an "oppressed people" as a "measure of last resort", or "self-help," in response to serious and persistent violations of their fundamental rights.

One of the criteria for a legitimate claim to remedial secession is that the claimant people should constitute a clear majority within the territory concerned. Some scholars have suggested that this threshold should be at least 80% of the population. According to the last internationally recognized census, however, Abkhazia's population consisted of 45.7% Georgians and only 17.8% Abkhazians, while Armenians, Russians, and Greeks also constituted significant minorities. Following the 1992–1993 war, the demographic composition of Abkhazia changed dramatically, primarily as a result of the forced displacement of most ethnic Georgians. Abkhazia formally declared independence in 1999 following a referendum, after a significant change in the demographic composition of the region. According to the 2003 census, the Georgian share of the population had fallen to approximately 20%, while the Abkhaz share had risen to 44.1%. Under the "clear majority" criterion, the Abkhazians would not have possessed a valid claim to remedial secession.

Moreover, there was considerable scope for internal self-determination within Georgia. Following the restoration of Georgia's independence, the Georgian government offered Abkhazia the broadest possible autonomous status within a federal framework, while reserving core sovereign functions for the central government. The Abkhaz leadership rejected the proposal, insisting instead on a confederal arrangement that would have recognized Abkhazia as a sovereign entity with a right to secede. Georgia also demonstrated its willingness to accommodate Abkhaz autonomy through the August 1991 compromise, which established ethnic quotas in the Abkhaz parliament that disproportionately favored Abkhaz representation despite their demographic minority status. Consequently, Abkhazia did not exhaust the available avenues for internal self-determination before pursuing secession.

During the 1992–1993 conflict, Russia maintained an extensive military presence in the region. Russia transferred military equipment to the Abkhaz side, including T-72 tanks, Grad multiple rocket launchers, more than 100,000 landmines, and other heavy weapons. Russian forces provided Abkhaz forces with at least some heavy weaponry, transportation, and fuel. While a third state may provide assistance to the de jure or de facto legitimate government of a state during an internal conflict, international law does not permit the supply of weapons and military assistance to internal armed opposition groups, such as the Abkhaz forces. Russia financed, trained, and provided logistical and military support to Abkhaz armed groups. In the first half of 1993, Russia also directly used force against Georgia. Russian air strikes in Abkhazia constituted an unlawful use of force against Georgian territory. Throughout the conflict, Russia operated in a demonstrably covert manner, a pattern that has been compared to its later involvement in the annexation of Crimea and the conflict in eastern Ukraine. Russian involvement in the conflict constituted a violation of Georgia's sovereignty.

== Kosovo as a precedent ==
The Assembly of the Serbian Autonomous Province of Kosovo and Metohija, under administration of the United Nations Interim Administration Mission in Kosovo since 1999, unilaterally declared independence as the Republic of Kosovo on 17 February 2008. The Republic of Kosovo was soon recognised by the United States and the EU three.

At an emergency meeting of the UN Security Council, Serbian President Boris Tadić asked the Council, "Are we all aware of the precedent that is being set and are we aware of the catastrophic consequences that it may lead to?" The Permanent Representatives of the United States, United Kingdom and France presented their opinion that the Kosovo case was sui generis in nature and could not be perceived as a precedent.

The setting of a precedent was mentioned by many countries. Among them were Argentina, and Cuba. India stated that Kosovo "can set a very dangerous precedent for similar cases around the world." The then Russian President Vladimir Putin described the recognition by Western powers of Kosovo independence as "terrible precedent, which will de facto blow apart the whole system of international relations, developed not over decades, but over centuries." He then went on to say, "They have not thought through the results of what they are doing. At the end of the day it is a two-ended stick and the second end will come back and hit them in the face."

Some analysts at the time called ignoring Russian objections and the move by the United States and the EU-3 a mistake, with Ted Galen Carpenter of the Cato Institute stating that their view of Kosovo being sui generis and setting no precedent as "extraordinarily naïve". It was also suggested that Russia could use the case of Kosovo as pretext for recognising Abkhazia and South Ossetia or annexing Crimea in the future.

On 19 February 2008, Georgia's Foreign Minister Davit Bakradze stated that Georgia would not recognize Kosovo's independence. He said there was a consensus in Georgia on this issue, "regardless of political orientation." Bakradze added that Russia viewed the West's recognition of Kosovo as a challenge and planned to respond by taking similar steps in the former Soviet Union, which posed a "high degree of risk" for Georgia.

The Heritage Foundation suggested that Kosovo was no precedent because it was administrated by the United Nations as a protectorate for seven years and was blocked from being admitted to the United Nations only due to Russia being able to use its veto in the United Nations Security Council.

In July 2008, in a speech to Russian Ambassadors on Russian foreign policy, Dmitry Medvedev opined that "for the European Union, Kosovo is almost what Iraq has proved to be for the United States" and that they acted unilaterally in pursuit of their own self-interests and undermined international law in the process.

In September 2008 hearings before the United States House Committee on Foreign Affairs, California Republican Congressman and member of the Subcommittee on International Organizations, Human Rights, and Oversight, Dana Rohrabacher, compared the situation in Georgia to Kosovo.

"Now, we can talk until we are blue in the face, trying to say there is no analogy here, but it does not cover up the obvious analogy between Kosovo and what is going on in Georgia, where you have breakaway republics similar to what the Serbs faced. Now, the only difference is, of course, we are Americans, and they are Russians, and the people trying to break away there were pro-Russian.

Either we are for democracy, either we are for those people in Kosovo and in Ossetia and elsewhere and, I might say, in Georgia for their right to be separate from Russia, to begin with, and if we lose that, we have lost the high ground.

We are already losing our credibility right now. Let us not lose the high ground."

In December 2008, Martti Ahtisaari, author of Kosovo peace plan, said that Kosovo was not a precedent for the recognition of Abkhazia and South Ossetia.

Former advisor to Vladimir Putin Andrey Illarionov argued that Kosovo can not serve as a precedent for recognizing Abkhazia. He emphasized that the Abkhaz independence was established through the ethnic cleansing, primarily of Georgians, which were a majority of the region's population, diminishing their number by 81 percent, with the ethnic cleansing being recognized by the United Nations, the Organization for Security and Co-operation in Europe, and other international organizations. He also noted that there was no prosecution of those responsible for these crimes by the Abkhaz secessionist authorities, instead, they "were rewarded with fame, medals, and stolen property", while the politicians refused to even acknowledge the ethnic cleansing. He observed that not only are Georgians prevented from returning to Abkhazia, but most ethnic Georgians still remaining there are not allowed to vote. In Abkhazia, it was Abkhaz separatists who rejected peace plans; while in case of Kosovo, it was Serbia that thwarted peace process. Kosovo was ruled by U.N. administration before the declaration of independence; while Abkhazia does not admit international organizations. Illarionov pointed out three factors underpinning the illegitimacy of the Abkhaz independence: actions of the Abkhaz leaders, their ideology of ethnic supremacy and Russian military occupation.

"The differences between the two cases are stark. First, the most heinous crimes in Kosovo were committed by Serbians, the adversaries of secession; in Abkhazia, they were committed by the secessionists and their Russian allies. Second, the right of return of refugees to Kosovo was a precondition for self-determination; in Abkhazia, the so-called self-determination is linked with the refusal to allow the return of internally displaced people. Put simply, Kosovo's independence was a way of punishing ethnic cleansing. In Abkhazia, such recognition would represent a chilling validation of ethnic cleansing, and a reward to its authors."

Latvian newspaper Diena on 28 August 2008 argued that Medvedev's decree citing Kosovo was "a blow below the belt" for Russia's ally Serbia because "that means that Russia has indirectly admitted that Kosovo's departure from Serbia was lawful."

In April 2009, Russian Deputy Foreign Minister Alexander Grushko said that Russia would not recognize Kosovo even if the European Union recognized Abkhazia and South Ossetia. In May 2009, Konstantin Kosachev, chairman of the Russian State Duma Foreign Affairs Committee, declared that the support of the United States, the NATO and some Pacific countries was "not enough" to consider Kosovo as an independent state. In July 2009, President of Abkhazia Sergei Bagapsh responded to allegations that Abkhazia could not be considered independent because there were Russian military and border guards deployed in Abkhazia by stating that Kosovo was declared as independent state while there were 7,000 NATO troops deployed there. He said that recognition by a lot of countries was not necessary, and argued that although Western Sahara was recognized by 48 countries, it did not become an independent country. Bagapsh further stated that recognition by "serious states" was preferred to recognition by Papua New Guinea and Zimbabwe.

In September 2009, Russian Permanent Representative to the United Nations, Vitaly Churkin, explained why Abkhazia and South Ossetia should be internationally recognised and Kosovo not: "the strongest argument is the fact that at the time when Kosovo's authorities made the UDI, nobody was threatening them or putting them in a position where they had to secede. On the contrary, Belgrade even went so far as to refrain from exerting any military or economic pressure on Pristina."

In October 2009, Dmitry Medvedev said that Kosovo's unilateral declaration of independence and the consequences "have confirmed the inadequacy of attempts to adjust the solution of complex international problems to considerations of notorious political expediency." The Russian president said, "We consider it unacceptable to do what was done in the Kosovo precedent – to use the lack of progress at negotiations as the reason for unilateral actions, including recognition of new international legal entities." He said that comparison between Kosovo and South Ossetia was unacceptable. He said, "We are categorically against drawing incorrect parallels between the Balkan events and the events in the Caucasus. As concerns South Ossetia – it's our unambiguous, absolutely clear position – it was about repelling direct military aggression. And what was done by Russia after that, was done in full accordance with the UN Charter."

== As a precedent in other disputes ==
On 18 September 2008, Russian foreign minister Sergey Lavrov summarised and explained Russia's position in relation to the other two frozen conflicts in the former Soviet Union, the Nagorno-Karabakh Republic and Transnistria, both de facto independent republics seeking international recognition.

"Russia will provide active support to the peaceful resolution of all conflicts in the CIS area on the basis of international law, respect to all principles of UN charter, previously attained agreements in striving for an agreement between the involved parties. We will execute our mediatory mission in the negotiation process with great responsibility, which refers to Transdniestria and Nagorno Karabakh. Each conflict has its own features, format and mechanisms of mediation. But the South Ossetian crisis does not set a precedent for them."

He went on to give the following explanation for this position:

"None of those concerned with Nagorno-Karabakh and Transnistrian settlement plan to violate international law, tear up existing accords, destroy the agreed settlement formats and bomb civilian residents and peacekeepers. There is no one there who would like to ensure territorial integrity by mass killing of people whom you consider your citizens, residents of your own country. There can be no parallels here. Thank God Saakashvili is the sole phenomenon of its kind."

=== Nagorno-Karabakh ===
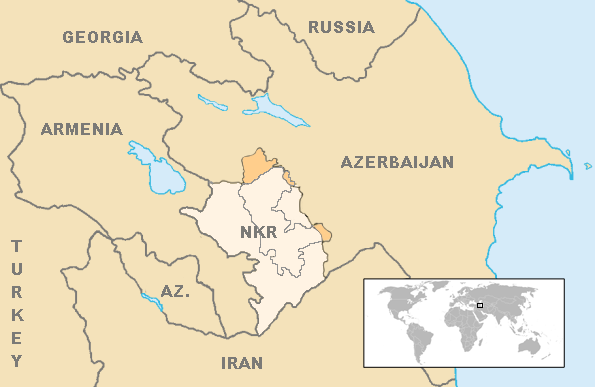
Map of Nagorno-Karabakh Republic

In Armenia the five political parties (the Union "Constitutional Right", the Democratic Party of Armenia, the United Communist Party of Armenia, the Christian-Democratic Union of Armenia and the Union "National Self-Determination") welcomed the recognition of Abkhazia and South Ossetia by the Russian Federation. The Union "Constitutional Justice" stated in a declaration that "today an unprecedently favourable situation for the international recognition of the Nagorno Karabakh Republic has come to a head, and Armenian diplomacy does not have the right to delay" and "What Armenian and Karabakh diplomacy could not do in 17 years, Russia has done in 20 days." The declaration went on to say that "in case of the conflicts which have arisen on post-Soviet space, the thesis of territorial integrity cannot be a method for solving the conflicts. On the contrary, the continued reiteration of this thesis can lead the conflict to military confrontation, and all of the consequences that entails."

The Armenian President Serzh Sargsyan, however, stated that Armenia would not recognise Abkhazia and South Ossetia in the near future "for the same reason that it did not recognize Kosovo's independence. Having the Nagorno-Karabakh conflict, Armenia can not recognize another entity in the same situation as long as it has not recognized the Nagorno-Karabakh Republic." He supported their populations' self-determination.

Secretary of the opposition party Heritage Stepan Safaryan expressed the opinion that the recognition of Abkhazia and South Ossetia by Armenia would be dangerous as it could damage Armenia's sole stable way to communicate with the outside world – through Georgia.

=== Transnistria ===
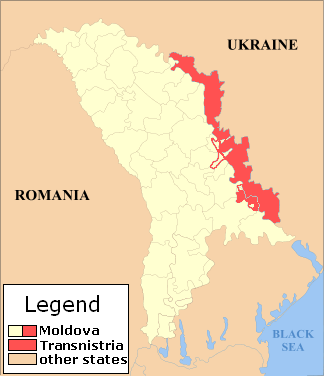
Map of Transnistria

The then president of the unrecognised state of Transnistria Igor Smirnov said that "the Russian leadership, in recognising the independence of Abkhazia and South Ossetia, has underlined the priority of the expression of the will of the people for solution of such problems".

On 25 August, the day before Russia's recognition, Dmitry Medvedev met with President of Moldova Vladimir Voronin, where the Russian leader made it clear that Moscow was ready to solve the Transnistria conflict within the framework of the sovereignty of the Republic of Moldova with the maximum effort. Relations between Moldova and Transnistria worsened after Moldova refused to support the independence of Abkhazia and South Ossetia, which Chişinău categorically rejected, considering that "as in the case of the recognition of Kosovo, this step only decreases amenability of the sides in the search for a compromise."

On 27 August, Russian ambassador to Moldova Valery Kuzmin warned the Moldovan authorities to take into consideration the war in Georgia and the Russian recognition of South Ossetia.

=== Separatism in Russia ===
On 21 August 2008, Russian Yabloko party warned against the recognition of Abkhazia and South Ossetia since it could threaten the territorial integrity of Russia. US presidential candidate John McCain said on 26 August 2008 that the West should consider the recognition of the North Caucasus and Chechnya. However, Head of the Chechen Republic Ramzan Kadyrov said that Chechnya did not want independence and suggested that being part of Russia was better than the war.

Georgian justice minister Nika Gvaramia said on 28 August 2008 that the recognition "will have very serious political consequences for Russia." He further said, "what is Russia going to do with its own state – in respect of separatism, which is still a problem in Russia; [...] I am sure that it will lead to a total collapse of Russia if not today, tomorrow, for sure." Ukrainian MP Borys Tarasyuk suggested that subjects of the Russian Federation could use the precedent of the recognition of South Ossetia to declare their independence.

In early September 2008, President Dmitry Medvedev did not express concerns about possibility of renewed separatist sentiments in the North Caucasus and believed such scenarios could only arise from foreign countries. Medvedev said at the meeting with the Federal Security Service in January 2009 that fighting against separatism, national and religious intolerance should be escalated because "Any propaganda of separatism, national and religious intolerance is a challenge to the stability and unity of our multinational state."

Head of the Republic of Ingushetia Murat Zyazikov commented on the possibility of the US recognition of Ingushetia that there were no separatist sentiments in Ingushetia. Russian human rights activists wrote to the Council of Europe in September 2008, "the situation in the North Caucasus republics has become greatly more agitated since the war between Russia and Georgia in the South Caucasus." Ingush opposition activist, Magomet Khasbiyev in an interview with radio station Ekho Moskvy called for Ingushetia to separate from Russia, saying that "We must ask Europe or the US to separate us from Russia. If we aren't acceptable to this country, we don't know what else we should do." Ruslan Aushev, former president of Ingushetia, said in October 2008 that the Russian recognition of Abkhazia and South Ossetia was a mistake which could provoke the declarations of independence of the Russian subjects.

The Russian recognition of Abkhazia and South Ossetia reignited the discussions of independence for Tatarstan and Bashkortostan. In early September 2008, Bashkir nationalist movement Kuk Bure issued a statement suggesting that Russian support of Abkhazia and South Ossetia compelled the Bashkir people to seek self-determination of Bashkortostan. The Ittifaq Party stated that Russia must recognize the independence of the Republic of Tatarstan. Tatar nationalists held a rally in Kazan on the anniversary of the fall of Kazan and demanded the independence of Tatarstan invoking the precedents of the recognition of South Ossetia and Kosovo. In late December 2008, Tatar nationalists attended a meeting of Milli Majlis of the Tatar people in Naberezhnye Chelny, which adopted a declaration of independence of Tatarstan citing the recognition of Kosovo and South Ossetia. US citizen Vil Mirzayanov was elected as chairman of the government-in-exile of Tatarstan.

Leader of the Russian opposition Boris Nemtsov stated in December 2008 that the recognition of Abkhazia and South Ossetia was "a mistake of the year", which would mark the beginning of the disintegration of Russia. Member of the United States House of Representatives Ileana Ros-Lehtinen stated at the hearing of the Foreign Affairs Committee in February 2009 that Russian recognition of Georgian territories "may well reopen painful questions regarding Russian sovereignty over parts of its own territory that may seek independence."

=== In Italy ===
Sardinian nationalists declared independence of Mal di Ventre, citing Kosovo and South Ossetia.

== Various arguments ==
When asked about UN resolutions that supported Georgia's territorial integrity, Permanent Representative of Russia to the United Nations Vitaly Churkin claimed, "Their use of force against South Ossetia clearly dashed all those previous resolutions and created a completely new reality." However, France's deputy UN ambassador Jean-Pierre Lacroix argued that "there is no way you can “dash” or “cancel” or whatever “terminate” a resolution of the Security Council by force."

Following the Russian recognition of South Ossetia, Swedish Minister for Foreign Affairs Carl Bildt stated, "South Ossetian independence is a joke. We are talking about a smugglers' paradise of 60,000 people financed by the Russian security services. No one can seriously consider that as an independent state."

Member of the Russian State Duma Konstantin Zatulin declared on the third anniversary of the recognition that the Russian recognition of South Ossetia's independence was enough and South Ossetia would not gain new prospects by being recognized by more countries.

In April 2014, it was suggested that Russia was more humiliated by Tuvalu's withdrawal of recognition of Abkhazia and South Ossetia than by international sanctions for Crimea, since this "decision could spell the end of a years-long diplomatic strategy that has cost Russia millions."

Stephen F. Jones argued that the South Ossetian court's decision to strip Alla Dzhioyeva of her victory in the 2012 presidential elections "illustrated the region's limited political autonomy, underlined by the intimidating and unchallengeable presence of the Russian military". He said it demonstrated that South Ossetia was "not a real state, but a Russian vassal." Jones noted that Russia administers South Ossetia's borders and there is no South Ossetian foreign policy and no functions of a state. There is also no prospects for cooperation with Georgia, a natural economic partner, and annexation by Russia is also unlikely due to the complications it might cause in the North Caucasian Federal District.

== See also ==
- Russo-Georgian War
- International reaction to the Russo-Georgian War
- Kosovo independence precedent
- List of states with limited recognition
- South Ossetian independence referendum, 2006
- International recognition of Abkhazia and South Ossetia
