= 1992 South Ossetian independence referendum =

An independence referendum was held in South Ossetia on 19 January 1992. The voters answered the questions: "Do you agree that South Ossetia should be an independent country?" and "Do you agree with the South Ossetian parliament solution of September 1, 1991 on reunion with Russia?" The proposals were approved by 99.9% of voters, but the results were not recognised internationally.

== Background ==
In November 1989 the Supreme Soviet of the South Ossetian Autonomous Oblast voted for conversion to the status of an Autonomous Soviet Socialist Republic. However, the Georgian government revoked the territory's autonomous status on 1 December 1990. Although Georgia boycotted the March 1991 referendum on creating a renewed Soviet federation, South Ossetian voters took part. When Georgia held an independence referendum later in the month, it was boycotted in South Ossetia.

On 28 November 1991 the South Ossetia government declared independence.

== Results ==
Question	For		Against		Invalid/ blank	Total votes	Registered voters	Turnout	Outcome
Question	Votes	%	Votes	%	Invalid/ blank	Total votes	Registered voters	Turnout	Outcome
Independence	53,308	99.91	48	0.09	85	53,441	55,151	96.90	Approved
Reunion with Russia	53,291	99.89	57	0.11	93	53,441	55,151	96.90	Approved
Source: Direct Democracy

== See also ==
- Proposed Russian annexation of South Ossetia
