= List of next general elections =

This is a list of the next general elections around the world in sovereign states. The general elections listed are for the government of each jurisdiction. These elections determine the prime minister and makeup of the legislature in a parliamentary system, or the legislature and the president in a system where separate votes are taken for different branches of government. In most jurisdictions, general elections are held between every three to five years, with presidential elections sometimes attaining six (Mexico, and Russia since a 2008 amendment) or seven years (Ireland’s President).

A country's constitution and laws may give elections a fixed timing (i.e. United States, Switzerland and Sweden) while some allow the government to dissolve Parliament and call a new vote up to a certain time limit (United Kingdom, Israel and Japan). Some constitutions may require parliaments to elect the head of state under threat of dissolution (Greece before 2019). In most countries, the election for the representative assembly determines the government. In all of the countries in the Americas that directly elect their president, the presidential and the legislative election is held at the same time (except in Colombia, Haiti, and Venezuela); however, most countries in Europe split these elections and schedule them at different times.

International standards set a number of rules to judge whether the election is unfair. Some countries hold staged elections, but in most cases the election's outcome is the result of organized influence as per social choice theory. Human rights violations include "compromise of the right to participate in government through free elections", the right to freedom of association, or the right to free expression. Elections may also be unfair if unlawful political campaign financing favours particular interest groups, or if the law implicitly favors some through this means. Finally, media ownership may also create significant media bias.

The National Democratic Institute also maintains a calendar of general elections.

== List of next elections ==
In cases where an election spans multiple days or has multiple phases, the first date of the election is presented in the table below. In cases where the exact date is unspecified, the latest possible date is listed in the "Next" column. Partially recognized countries are listed in italics.

=== Africa ===
Country	Legislative election			Presidential election			Fairness	In power now
Country	Term	Last	Next	Term	Last	Next	Fairness	In power now
Algeria	5	2 Jul 2026	Jul 2031	5	7 Sep 2024	Sep 2029	Dominant-party system	FLN, RND, FM, El Binaa
Angola	5	24 Aug 2022	24 Aug 2027	5	24 Aug 2022	24 Aug 2027	Dominant-party system, alleged fraud	MPLA
Benin	7	11 Jan 2026	11 Jan 2033	7	12 Apr 2026	May 2033	Political suppression	UPR, BR
Botswana	5	30 Oct 2024	7 Jan 2030	—N/a				UDC, BPF
Burkina Faso	5	22 Nov 2020	Next	5	22 Nov 2020	Next	Coup d'état	Military junta
Burundi	5	5 Jun 2025	Jul 2030	7	20 May 2020	3 May 2027	Dominant-party system	CNDD–FDD
Cameroon	5	9 Feb 2020	20 Dec 2026	7	12 Oct 2025	Nov 2032	Dominant-party system, alleged fraud	CPDM
Cape Verde	5	17 May 2026	Jun 2031	5	15 Nov 2026	Nov 2031	Alleged fraud	MpD
Central African Republic	7	28 Dec 2025	Jan 2033	7	28 Dec 2025	Jan 2033	Civil war	MCU
Chad	5	29 Dec 2024	Feb 2030	5	6 May 2024	May 2029	Insurgency	MPS
Comoros	5	30 Jan 2025	Apr 2030	5	14 Jan 2024	Jan 2029	Protests	CRC
Democratic Republic of the Congo	5	20 Dec 2023	Dec 2028	5	20 Dec 2023	Dec 2028	Alleged fraud, insurgency	USN
Republic of the Congo	5	10 Jul 2022	Jul 2027	5	15 Mar 2026	Mar 2031	Dominant-party system	PCT
Djibouti	5	24 Feb 2023	Mar 2028	5	10 Apr 2026	May 2031	Dominant-party system	UMP
Egypt	5	10 Nov 2025	Jan 2031	6	10 Dec 2023	Dec 2029	Political suppression, alleged fraud	Mostaqbal Watan
Equatorial Guinea	5	20 Nov 2022	Nov 2027	7	20 Nov 2022	Nov 2029	Dominant-party system, political suppression	PDGE
Eritrea	—N/a			—N/a			One-party state, does not hold elections	PFDJ
Eswatini	5	29 Sep 2023	Oct 2028	—N/a			Absolute monarchy, parliament has very limited powers	King of Eswatini
Ethiopia	5	1 Jun 2026	Jun 2031	6	7 Oct 2024	Oct 2030	Dominant-party system, political suppression	Prosperity Party
Gabon	5	27 Sep 2025	Nov 2030	7	12 Apr 2025	May 2032	Alleged fraud	Rally for the Fatherland and Modernity
Gambia	5	9 Apr 2022	10 Apr 2027	5	4 Dec 2021	5 Dec 2026	Protests	NPP
Ghana	4	7 Dec 2024	7 Jan 2029	4	7 Dec 2024	7 Jan 2029		NPP
Guinea	5	31 May 2026	May 2031	6	28 Dec 2025	Jan 2033	Political suppression, alleged fraud	National Committee of Reconciliation and Development
Guinea-Bissau	4	23 Nov 2025	Next	5	23 Nov 2025	Next	Coup d'état	Military junta
Ivory Coast	5	27 Dec 2025	Jan 2031	5	25 Oct 2025	Dec 2030		RHDP
Kenya	5	9 Aug 2022	10 Aug 2027	5	9 Aug 2022	10 Aug 2027	Protests	UDA
Lesotho	5	7 Oct 2022	Oct 2027	—N/a				RFP
Liberia	6	10 Oct 2023	Oct 2029	6	10 Oct 2023	Oct 2029		UP
Libya	5	25 Jun 2014	17 Feb 2027	5	—N/a	17 Feb 2027	Recent political, security, and economic crisis	Government of National Unity
Madagascar	5	29 May 2024	July 2029	5	16 Nov 2023	Sep 2027	Coup d'état	Military junta
Malawi	5	16 Sep 2025	17 Sep 2030	5	16 Sep 2025	17 Sep 2030		DPP
Mali	5	29 Mar 2020	Next	5	29 Jul 2018	Next	Coup d'état	Military junta
Mauritania	5	13 May 2023	Jun 2028	5	29 Jun 2024	Jun 2029	Alleged fraud, protests	El Insaf
Mauritius	5	10 Nov 2024	Nov 2029	5	10 Nov 2024	Nov 2029		MSM
Morocco	5	23 Sep 2026	Sep 2031	—N/a				RNI, PAM, PI
Mozambique	5	9 Oct 2024	Oct 2029	5	9 Oct 2024	Oct 2029	Dominant-party system, protests	FRELIMO
Namibia	5	27 Nov 2024	Mar 2030	5	27 Nov 2024	Mar 2030	Dominant-party system	SWAPO
Niger	5	27 Dec 2020	Jul 2030	5	27 Dec 2020	Jul 2030	Coup d'état	Military junta
Nigeria	4	25 Feb 2023	16 Jan 2027	4	25 Feb 2023	16 Jan 2027		APC
Rwanda	5	15 Jul 2024	Jul 2029	5	15 Jul 2024	Jul 2029	Dominant-party system, political suppression	FPR
Sahrawi Arab Democratic Republic	3	8 Apr 2023	Apr 2027	3	20 Jan 2023	19 Jan 2027	One-party state	Polisario Front
Sao Tome and Principe	4	27 Sep 2026	Sep 2030	5	19 Jul 2026	Jul 2031		ADI
Senegal	5	17 Nov 2024	Dec 2029	5	24 Mar 2024	Apr 2029		PASTEF
Seychelles	5	25 Sep 2025	Oct 2030	5	25 Sep 2025	Oct 2030		US
Sierra Leone	5	24 Jun 2023	Jun 2028	5	24 Jun 2023	Jun 2028		SLPP
Somalia	4	29 Jul 2021	Next	5	15 May 2022	Next	Political crisis	UPD
Somaliland	5	31 May 2021	Mar 2027	5	13 Nov 2024	1 Dec 2029		Waddani, UCID
South Africa	5	29 May 2024	12 Sep 2029	—N/a				Government of National Unity
South Sudan	4	—N/a	11 Feb 2027	4	—N/a	11 Feb 2027	Recent civil war	SPLM
Sudan	5	13 Apr 2015	Next	5	13 Apr 2015	Next	Coup d'état, civil war	Military junta
Tanzania	5	29 Oct 2025	29 Oct 2030	5	29 Oct 2025	29 Oct 2030	Dominant-party system, political suppression	CCM
Togo	6	29 Apr 2024	Jun 2030	4	3 May 2025	May 2029	Dominant-party system	UNIR
Tunisia	5	17 Dec 2022	Dec 2027	5	6 Oct 2024	Oct 2029		25th of July Movement
Uganda	5	15 Jan 2026	May 2031	5	15 Jan 2026	May 2031	Dominant-party system	NRM
Zambia	5	13 Aug 2026	Aug 2031	5	13 Aug 2026	Aug 2031		UPND
Zimbabwe	7	23 Aug 2023	5 Aug 2030	7	23 Aug 2023	Sep 2030	Dominant-party system, alleged fraud	ZANU–PF

=== Americas ===
Country	Legislative election			Presidential election			Fairness	In power now
Country	Term	Last	Next	Term	Last	Next	Fairness	In power now
Antigua and Barbuda	5	30 Apr 2026	May 2031	—N/a			Dominant-party system	ABLP
Argentina	2	26 Oct 2025	24 Oct 2027	4	22 Oct 2023	24 Oct 2027		LLA
Bahamas	5	12 May 2026	May 2031	—N/a				PLP
Barbados	5	11 Feb 2026	21 May 2031	4	7 Oct 2025	Oct 2029		BLP
Belize	5	12 Mar 2025	9 Aug 2030	—N/a				PUP
Bolivia	5	17 Aug 2025	Nov 2030	5	17 Aug 2025	Nov 2030		PDC
Brazil	4	4 Oct 2026	4 Oct 2030	4	4 Oct 2026	4 Oct 2030		PT
Canada	4	28 Apr 2025	15 Oct 2029	—N/a				Liberal
Chile	4	16 Nov 2025	Mar 2030	4	16 Nov 2025	Mar 2030		CpCh
Colombia	4	8 Mar 2026	Mar 2030	4	31 May 2026	May 2030		CD-led coalition
Costa Rica	4	1 Feb 2026	May 2030	4	1 Feb 2026	May 2030		PPSO
Cuba	5	26 Mar 2023	Mar 2028	5	19 Apr 2023	Apr 2028	One-party state	PCC
Dominica	5	6 Dec 2022	16 Dec 2026	5	27 Sep 2023	Sep 2028	Dominant-party system	DLP
Dominican Republic	4	19 May 2024	Aug 2028	4	19 May 2024	Aug 2028		PRM
Ecuador	4	9 Feb 2025	May 2029	4	9 Feb 2025	May 2029		ADN
El Salvador	3	4 Feb 2024	28 Feb 2027	6	4 Feb 2024	28 Feb 2027		NI
Grenada	5	5 Nov 2026	Nov 2031	—N/a				NDC
Guatemala	4	25 Jun 2023	27 Jun 2027	4	25 Jun 2023	27 Jun 2027		Movimiento Semilla
Guyana	5	1 Sep 2025	Sep 2030	5	1 Sep 2025	Sep 2030		PPP/C
Haiti	6	9 Aug 2015	18 Jul 2027	5	20 Nov 2016	18 Jul 2027	Gang war, political crisis	Transitional Presidential Council
Honduras	4	30 Nov 2025	Nov 2029	4	30 Nov 2025	Nov 2029		Libre
Jamaica	5	3 Sep 2025	3 Sep 2030	—N/a				JLP
Mexico	3	2 Jun 2024	6 Jun 2027	6	2 Jun 2024	Jun 2030	Violence, drug war	SHH
Nicaragua	6	7 Nov 2021	Next	6	7 Nov 2021	Next	Political suppression	FSLN
Panama	5	5 May 2024	5 May 2029	5	5 May 2024	5 May 2029		RM
Paraguay	5	30 Apr 2023	Apr 2028	5	30 Apr 2023	Apr 2028	Dominant-party system	Colorado
Peru	5	12 Apr 2026	13 Apr 2031	5	12 Apr 2026	13 Apr 2031		Popular Force
Saint Kitts and Nevis	5	5 Aug 2022	Aug 2027	—N/a				SKNLP
Saint Lucia	5	1 Dec 2025	1 Dec 2030	—N/a				SLP
Saint Vincent and the Grenadines	5	27 Nov 2025	Dec 2030	—N/a				NDP
Suriname	5	25 May 2025	25 May 2030	5	25 May 2025	25 May 2030		NDP, ABOP, NPS, PL, BEP, A20
Trinidad and Tobago	5	28 Apr 2025	Apr 2030	5	20 Jan 2023	Jan 2028		UNC
United States	2	3 Nov 2026	7 Nov 2028	4	5 Nov 2024	7 Nov 2028	Political suppression, alleged fraud	Republican
Uruguay	5	27 Oct 2024	28 Oct 2029	5	27 Oct 2024	28 Oct 2029		FA
Venezuela	5	25 May 2025	May 2030	6	28 Jul 2024	Next	Political suppression, disputed elections, political unrest	PSUV

=== Asia ===
Country	Legislative election			Presidential election			Fairness	In power now
Country	Term	Last	Next	Term	Last	Next	Fairness	In power now
Abkhazia	5	12 Mar 2022	12 Apr 2027	5	15 Feb 2025	2 Apr 2030	Alleged fraud	Independents
Afghanistan	—N/a	20 Oct 2018	—N/a	—N/a	28 Sep 2019	—N/a	Autocratic Theocracy, does not hold elections	Taliban
Armenia	5	7 Jun 2026	14 Jun 2031	7	3 Mar 2022	11 Feb 2029		Civil Contract
Azerbaijan	5	1 Sep 2024	4 Nov 2029	7	7 Feb 2024	7 Feb 2031	Dominant-party system, authoritarian state	YAP
Bahrain	4	12 Nov 2022	12 Dec 2027	—N/a			Political suppression	Independents
Bangladesh	5	12 Feb 2026	Mar 2031	5	20 Aug 2026	Mar 2031		BNP
Bhutan	5	30 Nov 2023	Jan 2029	—N/a				PDP
Brunei	—N/a	20 Mar 1965	—N/a	—N/a			Absolute monarchy, does not hold elections	Sultan of Brunei
Cambodia	5	23 Jul 2023	30 Jul 2028	—N/a			Dominant-party system	CPP
China	5	1 Oct 2022	Mar 2028	5	5 Mar 2023	Mar 2028	One-party state, indirectly elected legislature	CCP
Cyprus	5	24 May 2026	May 2031	5	5 Feb 2023	Feb 2028		DIKO, DiPa, EDEK minority coalition
Georgia	4	26 Oct 2024	Oct 2028	5	14 Dec 2024	Dec 2029		Georgian Dream
India	5	19 Apr 2024	Jun 2029	5	18 Jul 2022	Jul 2027		BJP-led coalition
Indonesia	5	14 Feb 2024	20 Oct 2029	5	14 Feb 2024	20 Oct 2029	Alleged fraud	Advanced Indonesia Coalition
Iran	4	1 Mar 2024	May 2028	4	28 Jun 2024	Jun 2028	Candidates must be approved by Guardian Council	Principlists
Iraq	4	11 Nov 2025	Dec 2029	4	11 Apr 2026	Apr 2030		Multi-party supply and confidence of Independent government
Israel	4	27 Oct 2026	Oct 2030	7	2 Jun 2021	Jul 2028	War	Likud-led coalition
Japan	4	8 Feb 2026	8 Feb 2030	—N/a				LDP
Jordan	4	10 Sep 2024	Sep 2028	—N/a			Political suppression	Independents
Kazakhstan	5	23 Aug 2026	Jun 2031	7	20 Nov 2022	Nov 2029	Authoritarian state, sham elections	Adilet
Kuwait	4	4 Apr 2024	Apr 2028	—N/a			Political suppression	Independents
Kyrgyzstan	5	30 Nov 2025	Feb 2031	6	10 Jan 2021	27 Jan 2027	Authoritarian state, sham elections	Mekenchil-led coalition
Laos	5	22 Feb 2026	Feb 2031	5	23 Mar 2026	Mar 2031	One-party state	LPRP
Lebanon	4	15 May 2022	May 2028	6	29 Sep 2022	Jan 2031		Independent
Malaysia	5	19 Nov 2022	17 Feb 2028	—N/a				PH-led coalition
Maldives	5	21 Apr 2024	May 2029	5	9 Sep 2023	Sep 2028		PNC
Mongolia	4	28 Jun 2024	Jun 2028	6	9 Jun 2021	Mar 2027		MPP
Myanmar	5	28 Dec 2025	Jan 2031	5	3 Apr 2026	Apr 2031	Authoritarian state, civil war, sham elections	Min Aung Hlaing, supported by the USDP
Nepal	5	5 Mar 2026	Mar 2031	5	9 Mar 2023	Mar 2028		NSP
North Korea	5	15 Mar 2026	Mar 2031	—N/a			Totalitarian One-party state	WPK
Northern Cyprus	5	23 Jan 2022	6 Dec 2026	5	19 Oct 2025	Oct 2030		UBP, DP, YDP coalition
Oman	4	29 Oct 2023	Oct 2027	—N/a			Absolute monarchy, elections to Consultative Assembly	Sultan of Oman
Pakistan	5	8 Feb 2024	28 Feb 2029	5	9 Mar 2024	Mar 2029	Political suppression, clashes	PML(N) and PPP-led coalition, military
Palestine	4	25 Jan 2006	11 Sep 2027	4	9 Jan 2005	11 Sep 2027	War, no elections held for over 20 years	Fatah (West Bank), Hamas (Gaza)
Philippines	3	12 May 2025	8 May 2028	6	9 May 2022	8 May 2028	Alleged fraud	Alyansa
Qatar	—N/a	2 Oct 2021	—N/a	—N/a			Legislature appointed by the emir, does not hold elections	Emir of Qatar
Saudi Arabia	—N/a			—N/a			Absolute monarchy, does not hold elections	King of Saudi Arabia
Singapore	5	3 May 2025	5 Dec 2030	6	1 Sep 2023	Sep 2029	Dominant-party system	PAP
South Korea	4	10 Apr 2024	12 Apr 2028	5	3 June 2025	27 Mar 2030		DPK
South Ossetia	5	9 Jun 2024	Jun 2029	5	18 Sep 2026	Sep 2031		Multi-party coalition
Sri Lanka	5	14 Nov 2024	21 Feb 2030	5	21 Sep 2024	Sep 2029		NPP
Syria	5	5 Oct 2025	Jul 2031	5	26 May 2021	Dec 2029	Provisional government	Syrian transitional government
Taiwan	4	13 Jan 2024	15 Jan 2028	4	13 Jan 2024	15 Jan 2028		DPP
Tajikistan	5	2 Mar 2025	Mar 2030	7	11 Oct 2020	Oct 2027	Authoritarian state, sham elections	PDP
Thailand	4	8 Feb 2026	25 Mar 2030	—N/a			Independent organs interference	BJT-led coalition
Timor-Leste	5	21 May 2023	May 2028	5	19 Mar 2022	Mar 2027		CNRT and PD
Turkey	5	14 May 2023	7 May 2028	5	14 May 2023	14 May 2028	Competitive authoritarianism	AKP
Turkmenistan	5	26 Mar 2023	Apr 2028	7	12 Mar 2022	Mar 2029	Authoritarian state, sham elections	TDP
United Arab Emirates	4	7 Oct 2023	Oct 2027	5	14 May 2022	May 2027	Absolute monarchy, indirect election to advisory Federal National Council.	Federal Supreme Council
Uzbekistan	5	27 Oct 2024	Oct 2029	7	9 Jul 2023	Jul 2030	Authoritarian state, sham elections	UzLiDeP and Milliy Tiklanish
Vietnam	5	15 Mar 2026	Mar 2031	5	7 Apr 2026	Apr 2031	One-party state	CPV
Yemen	6	27 Apr 2003	Next	7	21 Feb 2012	Next	Protests, civil war, no elections held for over 20 years	GPC

=== Europe ===
Country	Legislative election			Presidential election			Fairness	In power now
Country	Term	Last	Next	Term	Last	Next	Fairness	In power now
Albania	4	11 May 2025	25 Jun 2029	5	16 May 2022	23 Aug 2027	Alleged fraud, protests	PS
Andorra	4	2 Apr 2023	5 Jun 2027	—N/a				DA–CC
Austria	5	29 Sep 2024	24 Oct 2029	6	9 Oct 2022	17 Oct 2028		ÖVP, SPÖ, NEOS coalition
Belarus	4	25 Feb 2024	22 Mar 2028	5	26 Jan 2025	25 Mar 2030	Authoritarian state, sham elections, political suppression	Belaya Rus
Belgium	5	9 Jun 2024	10 Jul 2029	—N/a				N-VA, MR, LE, Vooruit, CD&V coalition
Bosnia and Herzegovina	4	4 Oct 2026	6 Oct 2030	4	4 Oct 2026	6 Oct 2030		SNSD, SDP BiH, HDZ BiH, NiP, DNS, NS, BHZ minority coalition
Bulgaria	4	19 Apr 2026	30 Jun 2030	4	25 Oct 2026	Oct 2031		Progressive Bulgaria
Croatia	4	17 Apr 2024	30 Apr 2028	5	29 Dec 2024	Jan 2030		HDZ, DP coalition
Czech Republic	4	3 Oct 2025	Oct 2029	5	13 Jan 2023	Jan 2028		ANO, SPD, AUTO coalition
Denmark	4	24 Mar 2026	23 Mar 2030	—N/a				A, F, M, B coalition
Estonia	4	5 Mar 2023	7 Mar 2027	5	2 Sep 2026	Oct 2031		Reform, E200 coalition
European Union	5	6 Jun 2024	7 Jun 2029	—N/a				EPP, S&D, Renew coalition
Finland	4	2 Apr 2023	18 Apr 2027	6	28 Jan 2024	Mar 2030		Kok., PS, KD, SFP coalition
France	5	30 Jun 2024	Jun 2029	5	10 Apr 2022	18 Apr 2027		Ensemble, LR minority coalition
Germany	4	23 Feb 2025	25 Mar 2029	5	13 Feb 2022	30 Jan 2027		CDU, SPD, CSU coalition
Greece	4	25 Jun 2023	25 Jul 2027	5	25 Jan 2025	Jan 2030		ND
Hungary	4	12 Apr 2026	May 2030	5	11 Aug 2026	Aug 2031		Tisza
Iceland	4	30 Nov 2024	2 Dec 2028	4	1 Jun 2024	Jun 2028		S, F, C coalition
Ireland	5	29 Nov 2024	Jan 2030	7	24 Oct 2025	Oct 2032		FF, FG, Independents coalition
Italy	5	25 Sep 2022	22 Dec 2027	7	24 Jan 2022	Jan 2029		Centre-right coalition
Kosovo	4	7 Jun 2026	11 Aug 2030	5	6 Oct 2026	Oct 2031		LVV, Guxo, PDS, IRDK, KDTP, NDS coalition
Latvia	4	3 Oct 2026	Oct 2030	4	31 May 2023	May 2027		Unity, ZZS, PRO coalition
Liechtenstein	4	9 Feb 2025	Feb 2029	—N/a				VU, FBP coalition
Lithuania	4	13 Oct 2024	8 Oct 2028	5	12 May 2024	13 May 2029		LSDP, NA, DSVL coalition
Luxembourg	5	8 Oct 2023	8 Oct 2028	—N/a				CSV, DP coalition
Malta	5	30 May 2026	Jun 2031	5	27 Mar 2024	Mar 2029		Labour
Moldova	4	28 Sep 2025	Sep 2029	4	20 Oct 2024	Nov 2028	Alleged fraud	PAS
Monaco	5	5 Feb 2023	Feb 2028	—N/a				UNM
Montenegro	4	11 Jun 2023	30 Jun 2027	5	19 Mar 2023	Apr 2028		PES, ZBCG, DCG, BS, SNP, ASh coalition
Netherlands	4	29 Oct 2025	15 May 2030	—N/a				VVD, CDA, D66 minority coalition
North Macedonia	4	8 May 2024	May 2028	5	24 Apr 2024	Apr 2029		VMRO-DPMNE, VLEN, ZNAM coalition
Norway	4	8 Sep 2025	Sep 2029	—N/a				A/Ap minority
Poland	4	15 Oct 2023	11 Nov 2027	5	18 May 2025	May 2030		KO, PL2050, PSL, NL coalition
Portugal	4	18 May 2025	14 Oct 2029	5	18 Jan 2026	Jan 2031		PSD, CDS–PP minority coalition
Romania	4	1 Dec 2024	30 Nov 2028	5	4 May 2025	May 2030		PSD, PNL, USR, UDMR coalition
Russia	5	18 Sep 2026	Sep 2031	6	15 Mar 2024	Mar 2030	Authoritarian state, sham elections, political suppression, war	United Russia
San Marino	5	9 Jun 2024	Jun 2029	0.5	15 Sep 2026	Mar 2027		PDCS, Libera–PS, PSD, AR coalition
Serbia	4	25 Oct 2026	Oct 2030	5	3 Apr 2022	27 Dec 2026	Alleged fraud	SNS, SPS, PUPS, SDPS, SPP, SSZ, SNP coalition
Slovakia	4	30 Sep 2023	25 Sep 2027	5	23 Mar 2024	Mar 2029		Smer–SD, Hlas–SD, SNS coalition
Slovenia	4	22 Mar 2026	22 Mar 2030	5	23 Oct 2022	Oct 2027		GS, SD, Levica coalition
Spain	4	23 Jul 2023	29 Nov 2026	—N/a				PSOE, Sumar minority coalition
Sweden	4	13 Sep 2026	8 Sep 2030	—N/a				M, KD, L minority coalition
Switzerland	4	22 Oct 2023	24 Oct 2027	1	10 Dec 2025	9 Dec 2026		see Federal Council
Transnistria	5	30 Nov 2025	30 Nov 2030	5	12 Dec 2021	13 Dec 2026	Dominant-party system, authoritarian state	Obnovlenie
Ukraine	5	21 Jul 2019	Next	5	31 Mar 2019	Next	War	SN
United Kingdom	5	4 Jul 2024	15 Aug 2029	—N/a				Labour
Vatican City	—N/a			—N/a	7 May 2025	—N/a	Absolute monarchy, chosen by conclave	Pope

Europe Elects provides a calendar featuring subnational elections in Europe.

=== Oceania ===
Country	Legislative election			Presidential election			Fairness	In power now
Country	Term	Last	Next	Term	Last	Next	Fairness	In power now
Australia	3	3 May 2025	20 May 2028	—N/a				Labor
Cook Islands	4	12 Aug 2026	Aug 2030	—N/a				Cook Islands Party
Fiji	4	14 Dec 2022	6 Feb 2027	3	31 Oct 2024	Nov 2027		People's Alliance, NFP, SODELPA
Kiribati	4	14 Aug 2024	Aug 2028	4	25 Oct 2024	Oct 2028		TKP
Marshall Islands	4	20 Nov 2023	15 Nov 2027	4	20 Nov 2023	15 Nov 2027		(no political parties)
Micronesia	2	4 Mar 2025	2 Mar 2027	4	11 May 2023	2 Mar 2027		(no political parties)
Nauru	4	11 Oct 2025	Oct 2029	4	14 Oct 2025	Oct 2029		(no political parties)
New Zealand	3	7 Nov 2026	Nov 2029	—N/a				National, ACT, NZ First
Niue	3	2 May 2026	May 2029	—N/a				(no political parties)
Palau	4	5 Nov 2024	7 Nov 2028	4	5 Nov 2024	7 Nov 2028		(no political parties)
Papua New Guinea	5	4 Jul 2022	Jul 2027	—N/a				Pangu Pati
Samoa	5	29 Aug 2025	Aug 2030	5	23 Aug 2022	Aug 2027		FAST
Solomon Islands	4	17 Apr 2024	Apr 2028	—N/a				OUR Party, People First, Kadere Party
Tonga	4	20 Nov 2025	Nov 2029	—N/a				(no political parties)
Tuvalu	4	26 Jan 2024	Jan 2028	—N/a				(no political parties)
Vanuatu	4	16 Jan 2025	Jan 2029	5	21 Jul 2022	Jul 2027		Broad coalition

== See also ==
- The Economist Democracy Index and democracy indices
- Election law and election fraud
- History of democracy
- List of the most recent elections by country
