= List of elections in 2027 =

This is a list of important elections that will be held in 2027.

- 2027 United Nations Security Council election
- 2027 national electoral calendar
- 2027 local electoral calendar

== Africa ==
- Angola
  - 2027 Angolan general election, August
- Burundi
  - 2027 Burundian presidential election
- Equatorial Guinea
  - 2027 Equatorial Guinean parliamentary election
- Ethiopia
  - 2027 Tigray regional election
- Gambia
  - 2027 Gambian parliamentary election, 10 April
- Kenya
  - 2027 Kenyan general election, 10 August
- Lesotho
  - 2027 Lesotho parliamentary election
- Libya
  - 2027 Libyan presidential election
  - 2027 Libyan parliamentary election
- Madagascar
  - 2027 Malagasy presidential election
- Nigeria
  - 2027 Nigerian general election, 16 January
  - 2027 Nigerian gubernatorial elections
    - 2027 Oyo State gubernatorial election, 11 March
- Republic of Congo
  - 2027 Republic of the Congo parliamentary election
- Somaliland
  - 2027 Somaliland parliamentary election, March
  - 2027 Somaliland municipal elections
- South Sudan
  - 2027 South Sudanese general election, 11 February
- Tunisia
  - 2027 Tunisian parliamentary election

== Americas ==
- Argentina
  - 2027 Argentine general election, 24 October
  - 2027 Argentine provincial elections
- Canada
  - 2027 Manitoba general election, 5 October
  - 2027 Northwest Territories general election, 5 October
  - 2027 Alberta general election
  - 2027 Prince Edward Island general election
- Colombia
  - 2027 Colombian regional and municipal elections, October
- El Salvador
  - 2027 Salvadoran presidential election, 28 February
  - 2027 Salvadoran legislative election, 28 February
- Guatemala
  - 2027 Guatemalan general election, June
- Haiti
  - 2027 Haitian general election, 18 July
- Mexico
  - 2027 Mexican legislative election, 6 June
  - 2027 Mexican local elections, 6 June
- Saint Kitts and Nevis
  - 2027 Saint Kitts and Nevis general election
- United States
  - 2027 United States elections, 2 November
    - 2027 United States gubernatorial elections
    - 2027 United States state legislative elections
    - 2027 United States Senate special election in Minnesota

== Asia ==
- Bahrain
  - 2027 Bahraini parliamentary election
- Cambodia
  - 2027 Cambodian communal elections, 6 June
- India
  - 2027 elections in India
    - 2027 Indian presidential election
    - 2027 Goa Legislative Assembly election
    - 2027 Gujarat Legislative Assembly election
    - 2027 Himachal Pradesh Legislative Assembly election
    - 2027 Manipur Legislative Assembly election
    - 2027 Punjab Legislative Assembly election
    - 2027 Uttar Pradesh Legislative Assembly election
    - 2027 Uttarakhand Legislative Assembly election
- Kyrgyzstan
  - 2027 Kyrgyz presidential election, 27 January
- Mongolia
  - 2027 Mongolian presidential election, June
- Oman
  - 2027 Omani general election, October
- Palestine
  - 2027 Palestinian presidential election, 11 September
  - 2027 Palestinian legislative election, 11 September
- Tajikistan
  - 2027 Tajik presidential elections
- Timor-Leste
  - 2027 East Timorese presidential election
- United Arab Emirates
  - 2027 Emirati parliamentary election

== Europe ==
- Albania
  - 2027 Albanian local elections
- Andorra
  - 2027 Andorran parliamentary election, April
- Austria
  - 2027 Tyrolean state election
  - 2027 Upper Austrian state election
- Estonia
  - 2027 Estonian parliamentary election, March
- Finland
  - 2027 Finnish parliamentary election, 18 April
  - 2027 Ålandic legislative election, 17 October
- France
  - 2027 French presidential election, 18 April
- Germany
  - 2027 German presidential election, 30 January
  - 2027 Saarland state election, 18 April
  - 2027 Schleswig-Holstein state election, 18 April
  - 2027 North Rhine-Westphalia state election, 25 April
  - 2027 Bremen state election, 30 May
  - 2027 Lower Saxony state election, 26 September
- Greece
  - 2027 Greek parliamentary election
- Italy
  - 2027 Italian general election
  - 2027 Sicilian regional election
  - 2027 Italian local elections
- Latvia
  - 2027 Latvian presidential election
- Montenegro
  - 2027 Montenegrin parliamentary election
- Netherlands
  - 2027 Dutch electoral college elections, 17 March
  - 2027 Dutch provincial elections, 17 March
  - 2027 Dutch Senate election, May
- Poland
  - 2027 Polish parliamentary election
- Slovakia
  - 2027 Slovak parliamentary election, 25 September
- Slovenia
  - 2027 Slovenian presidential election
- Spain
  - 2027 Spanish regional elections, 23 May
    - 2027 Asturian regional election
    - 2027 Balearic regional election
    - 2027 Canarian regional election
    - 2027 Cantabrian regional election
    - 2027 Castilian-Manchegan regional election
    - 2027 Riojan regional election
    - 2027 Madrilenian regional election
    - 2027 Murcian regional election
    - 2027 Navarrese regional election
    - 2027 Valencian regional election
  - 2027 Spanish local elections, 23 May
    - 2027 Barcelona municipal election
    - 2027 Madrid municipal election
    - 2027 Seville municipal election
    - 2027 Valencia municipal election
    - 2027 Zaragoza municipal election
- Switzerland
  - 2027 Swiss federal election, 24 October
- United Kingdom
  - 2027 United Kingdom local elections, 6 May
  - 2027 Northern Ireland Assembly election, 6 May

== Oceania ==
- Australia
  - 2027 New South Wales state election, 13 March
- Fiji
  - 2027 Fijian general election
  - 2027 Fijian local elections
- Marshall Islands
  - 2027 Marshallese general election
- Micronesia
  - 2027 Micronesian general election, 2 March
- Papua New Guinea
  - 2027 Papua New Guinean general election, June

== See also ==
- List of elections in 2026
- List of elections in 2028
