= 2027 national electoral calendar =

Worldwide national elections held in 2027

- Countries with national elections or referendums: Executive Legislative Executive and legislative Referendum Legislative and referendum

This national electoral calendar for 2027 lists the national and federal elections scheduled to be held in 2027 in all sovereign states and their dependent territories. By-elections are excluded, though national referendums are included. Specific dates are given when known.

== January ==
- 16 January: Nigeria, President, Senate and House of Representatives
- 27 January: Kyrgyzstan, President

== February ==
- 11 February: South Sudan, President, Assembly and Council of States
- 28 February: El Salvador, President and Legislative Assembly

== March ==
- 2 March: Micronesia, Parliament
- 9 March: Estonia, Parliament
- March: Somaliland, Parliament

== April ==
- 10 April: Gambia, Parliament
- 18 April:
  - France, President
  - Finland, Parliament
- April: Andorra, Parliament

== May ==
- 3 May: Burundi, President

== June ==
- 6 June: Mexico, Chamber of Deputies
- 27 June: Guatemala, President and Congress
- June: Mongolia, President

== August ==
- 10 August: Kenya, President, National Assembly and Senate
- 24 August: Angola, Parliament

== October ==
- 24 October:
  - Argentina, President, Senate and Chamber of Deputies
  - Switzerland, Council of States and National Council
- October: Oman, Parliament

== November ==
- November: Marshall Islands, Parliament

== Unknown date ==
- Bahrain, Parliament
- Cameroon, Parliament
- Dominica, Parliament
- Equatorial Guinea, Parliament
- Fiji, Parliament
- Greece, Parliament
- Italy, Chamber of Deputies and Senate
- Lesotho, Parliament
- Libya, President and Parliament
- Madagascar, President
- Montenegro, Parliament
- Papua New Guinea, Parliament
- Poland, Sejm and Senate
- Republic of the Congo, Parliament
- Saint Kitts and Nevis, Parliament
- Slovakia, Parliament
- Slovenia, President
- Tajikistan, President
- Timor-Leste, President
- Tunisia, Parliament
- United Arab Emirates, Parliament

== Indirect elections ==
- January: Indonesia, Vice President
- 30 January: Germany, President
- April and October: India, Rajya Sabha
- 24 May: Netherlands, Senate
- July: India, President

== See also ==
- 2027 local electoral calendar
- List of elections in 2027
- 2027 United Nations Security Council election
