= 2027 in Asia =

This is a list of events that will take or have taken place in Asia in 2027.

== Events ==
=== Planned or predicted ===
- 7 January to 5 February - 2027 AFC Asian Cup
- 15 to 25 January – The 2027 Winter World University Games are scheduled to be held in Changchun, China.
- 24 January - 2027 Kyrgyz presidential election
- 19 March to 26 September – The 2027 World Horticultural Expo is scheduled to be held in Yokohama, Japan.
- 6 June - 2027 Cambodian communal elections
- 1 to 12 August - The 2027 Summer World University Games will be held in Chungcheong Province, South Korea.
- 27 August to 12 September – The 2027 FIBA Basketball World Cup is scheduled to be held in Qatar.
- October -
  - 2027 Emirati parliamentary election
  - 2027 Tajik presidential election

==== Date Unknown ====
- 2027 Mongolian presidential election
- 21st National Congress of the Chinese Communist Party will convene
- World Youth Day 2027 will be held in South Korea.
- WrestleMania 43, the first WrestleMania held outside of North America will be held in Riyadh, Saudi Arabia in 2027.
