= 2027 Canadian electoral calendar =

2026 elections in Canada

This is a list of elections in Canada that will be held in 2027. Included are municipal, provincial and federal elections, by-elections on any level, referendums and party leadership races at any level.

== Overview of key electoral events ==
=== General elections ===
Date	Jurisdiction	Party before	First minister before	Party after	First minister after	Swing
TBD (On or before October 4, 2027)	Prince Edward Island	Progressive Conservative; 18 / 27	Rob Lantz			
TBD (On or before October 5, 2027)	Manitoba	New Democratic; 34 / 57	Wab Kinew			
October 5	Northwest Territories	Consensus government	R. J. Simpson	Consensus government		—N/a
TBD (On or before October 18, 2027)	Alberta	United Conservative; 49 / 87	Danielle Smith			

== Unscheduled elections ==
=== Federal ===
- Parry Sound—Muskoka

=== Provincial ===
- Lac Ste. Anne-Parkland (by-election not required to be held due to proximity to next Alberta general election)
