= 2027 local electoral calendar =

Worldwide elections held in 2027

This local electoral calendar for 2027 lists the subnational elections scheduled to be held in 2027. Referendums, recall and retention elections, and national by-elections (special elections) are also included. Specific dates are given where these are known.

== February ==
- 7 February: Japan, Aichi Prefecture, Governor.
- 14 February: Argentina, Neuquén, provincial elections
- 23 February: United States, 2027 Chicago mayoral election

== March ==
- 7 March: 2027 Lithuanian municipal elections
- 11 March: Nigeria, Oyo State, Governor
- 13 March: 2027 New South Wales state election
- 17 March: 2027 Dutch provincial elections

== April ==
- 18 April:
  - 2027 Saarland state election
  - 2027 Schleswig-Holstein state election
- 25 April: 2027 North Rhine-Westphalia state election

== May ==
- 7 May: 2027 United Kingdom local elections
  - 2027 Northern Ireland Assembly election
  - 2027 Northern Ireland local elections
  - 2027 Scottish local elections
  - 2027 Welsh local elections
- 9 May: Argentina, Tucumán, provincial elections
- 23 May:
  - 2027 Spanish regional elections
    - 2027 Asturian regional election
    - 2027 Balearic regional election
    - 2027 Canarian regional election
    - 2027 Cantabrian regional election
    - 2027 Castilian-Manchegan regional election
    - 2027 Riojan regional election
    - 2027 Madrilenian regional election
    - 2027 Murcian regional election
    - 2027 Navarrese regional election
    - 2027 Valencian regional election
  - 2027 Spanish local elections
    - 2027 Barcelona municipal election
    - 2027 Madrid municipal election
    - 2027 Seville municipal election
    - 2027 Valencia municipal election
    - 2027 Zaragoza municipal election
- 30 May: 2027 Bremen state election

== June ==
- 6 June:
  - Cambodia, communal elections
  - Mexico, state elections
- 13 June: Argentina, Santa Fe, provincial elections

== September ==
- 26 September: 2027 Lower Saxony state election

== October ==
- 5 October
  - 2027 Manitoba general election
  - 2027 Northwest Territories general election
- 17 October: 2027 Ålandic legislative election
- 24 October: Argentina, Catamarca, provincial elections

== November ==
- 2 November: United States, off-year elections

== Unknown date ==
=== Argentina ===
- 2027 Argentine provincial elections

=== Austria ===
- 2027 Tyrolean state election
- 2027 Upper Austrian state election

=== Canada ===
- 2027 Alberta general election
- 2027 Prince Edward Island general election

=== India ===
- 2027 Goa Legislative Assembly election
- 2027 Gujarat Legislative Assembly election
- 2027 Himachal Pradesh Legislative Assembly election
- 2027 Manipur Legislative Assembly election
- 2027 Punjab Legislative Assembly election
- 2027 Uttar Pradesh Legislative Assembly election
- 2027 Uttarakhand Legislative Assembly election

=== Italy ===
- 2027 Italian local elections
- 2027 Sicilian regional election
