= List of the most recent elections by country =

This article is a list of most recent general elections by country. Those listed include presidential elections and those held for legislatures, lower and upper house elections.

== List ==
| Country | President | Legislature | |
| Country | President | Lower House | Upper House |
|---|---|---|---|
| Abkhazia | 2025 | 2022 | |
| Afghanistan | Elective Monarchy (2016; installed 2021) | Appointed | |
| Åland | Indirectly-elected | 2023 | |
| Albania | Indirectly-elected (2022) | 2025 | |
| Algeria | 2024 | 2026 | Appointed/indirectly-elected (2025) |
| American Samoa | 2024 | 2024 | 2024 |
| Andorra | Monarchy | 2023 | |
| Angola | Indirectly-elected | 2022 | |
| Anguilla | Monarchy | 2025 | |
| Antigua and Barbuda | Monarchy | 2023 | Appointed |
| Argentina | 2023 | 2023 | 2023 |
| Armenia | Indirectly-elected (2022) | 2026 | |
| Aruba | Monarchy | 2024 | |
| Australia | Monarchy | 2025 | 2025 |
| Austria | 2022 | 2024 | Indirectly-elected |
| Azerbaijan | 2024 | 2024 | |
| Bahamas | Monarchy | 2026 | Appointed |
| Bahrain | Monarchy | 2022 | Appointed |
| Bangladesh | Indirectly-elected (2026) | 2026 | |
| Barbados | Indirectly-elected | 2026 | Appointed |
| Belarus | 2025 | 2024 | Appointed/indirectly-elected |
| Belgium | Monarchy | 2024 | Appointed/indirectly-elected |
| Belize | Monarchy | 2025 | Appointed |
| Benin | 2026 | 2026 | |
| Bermuda | Monarchy | 2025 | Appointed |
| Bhutan | Monarchy | 2023-24 | 2023 |
| Bolivia | 2025 | 2025 | 2025 |
| Bosnia and Herzegovina | 2026 | 2026 | Indirectly-elected |
| Botswana | Indirectly-elected | 2024 | Appointed/indirectly-elected |
| Brazil | 2026 | 2026 | 2026 |
| British Virgin Islands | Monarchy | 2023 | |
| Brunei | Monarchy | Appointed | |
| Bulgaria | 2026 | 2026 | |
| Burkina Faso | 2020 | 2020 | |
| Burundi | 2020 | 2025 | Indirectly-elected |
| Cambodia | Monarchy | 2023 | Appointed/indirectly-elected |
| Cameroon | 2025 | 2020 | Indirectly-elected |
| Canada | Monarchy | 2025 | Appointed |
| Cape Verde | 2021 | 2026 | |
| Cayman Islands | Monarchy | 2025 | |
| Central African Republic | 2025 | 2025 | |
| Chad | 2024 | 2024 | |
| Chile | 2025 | 2025 | 2025 |
| People's Republic of China | Indirectly-elected (2023) | Indirectly-elected (2022-2023) | |
| Republic of China | 2024 | 2024 | |
| Colombia | 2026 | 2026 | 2026 |
| Comoros | 2024 | 2025 | |
| Democratic Republic of the Congo | 2023 | 2023 | Indirectly-elected |
| Republic of the Congo | 2026 | 2022 | Indirectly-elected |
| Cook Islands | Monarchy | 2022 | |
| Costa Rica | 2026 | 2026 | |
| Croatia | 2024–2025 | 2024 | |
| Cuba | Indirectly-elected (2023) | 2023 | |
| Cyprus | 2023 | 2026 | |
| Czech Republic | 2023 | 2025 | 2024 |
| Denmark | Monarchy | 2026 | |
| Djibouti | 2026 | 2023 | |
| Dominica | Indirectly-elected | 2022 | |
| Dominican Republic | 2024 | 2024 | 2024 |
| East Timor | 2022 | 2023 | |
| Ecuador | 2025 | 2025 | |
| Egypt | 2023 | 2025 | 2025 |
| El Salvador | 2024 | 2024 | |
| Equatorial Guinea | 2022 | 2022 | |
| Eritrea | None | None | |
| Estonia | Indirectly-elected (2021) | 2023 | |
| Eswatini | Monarchy | 2023 | Appointed/indirectly-elected |
| Ethiopia | Indirectly-elected | 2026 | Indirectly-elected |
| Falkland Islands | Monarchy | 2025 | |
| Fiji | Indirectly-elected | 2022 | |
| Finland | 2024 | 2023 | |
| France | 2022 | 2024 | Indirectly-elected (2023) |
| Gabon | 2025 | 2025 | Indirectly-elected |
| Gambia | 2021 | 2022 | |
| Georgia | Indirectly-elected (2024) | 2024 | |
| Germany | Indirectly-elected (2022) | 2025 | Indirectly-elected |
| Ghana | 2024 | 2024 | |
| Gibraltar | Monarchy | 2023 | |
| Greece | Indirectly-elected | 2023 | |
| Grenada | Monarchy | 2022 | Appointed |
| Guatemala | 2023 | 2023 | |
| Guernsey | Monarchy | 2025 | |
| Guinea | 2025 | 2020 | |
| Guinea-Bissau | 2025 | 2025 | |
| Guyana | Indirectly-elected | 2025 | |
| Haiti | 2016 | 2015–17 | |
| Honduras | 2025 | 2025 | |
| Hong Kong Special Administrative Region | Indirectly-elected (2022) | 2025 | |
| Hungary | Indirectly-elected (2024) | 2026 | |
| Iceland | 2024 | 2024 | |
| India | Indirectly-elected (2022) | 2024 | Appointed/indirectly-elected (2025) |
| Indonesia | 2024 | 2024 | 2024 |
| Iran | 2024 | 2024 | |
| Iraq | Indirectly-elected (2022) | 2025 | |
| Republic of Ireland | 2025 | 2024 | Appointed/indirectly-elected |
| Israel | Indirectly-elected | 2022 | |
| Italy | Indirectly-elected (2022) | 2022 | 2022 |
| Ivory Coast | 2025 | 2025 | Appointed/indirectly-elected (2023) |
| Jamaica | Monarchy | 2025 | Appointed |
| Japan | Monarchy | 2026 | 2025 |
| Jersey | Monarchy | 2022 | |
| Jordan | Monarchy | 2024 | Appointed |
| Kazakhstan | 2022 | 2026 | Appointed/indirectly-elected (2023) |
| Kenya | 2022 | 2022 | 2022 |
| Kiribati | 2024 | 2024 | |
| North Korea | Indirectly-elected | 2026 | |
| South Korea | 2025 | 2024 | |
| Republic of Kosovo | Indirectly-elected | 2026 | |
| Kuwait | Monarchy | 2024 | |
| Kyrgyzstan | 2021 | 2025 | |
| Laos | Indirectly-elected | 2026 | |
| Latvia | Indirectly-elected | 2026 | |
| Lebanon | Indirectly-elected | 2022 | |
| Lesotho | Monarchy | 2022 | Appointed |
| Liberia | 2023 | 2023 | 2023 |
| Libya | Provisional | 2014 | |
| Liechtenstein | Monarchy | 2025 | |
| Lithuania | 2024 | 2024 | |
| Luxembourg | Monarchy | 2023 | |
| Macao Special Administrative Region | Indirectly-elected (2024) | 2025 | |
| Madagascar | 2023 | 2024 | Appointed/indirectly-elected |
| Malawi | 2025 | 2025 | |
| Malaysia | Monarchy | 2022 | Appointed/indirectly-elected |
| Maldives | 2023 | 2024 | |
| Mali | 2018 | 2020 | |
| Malta | Indirectly-elected (2024) | 2022 | |
| Isle of Man | Monarchy | 2021 | |
| Marshall Islands | Indirectly-elected | 2023 | |
| Mauritania | 2024 | 2023 | |
| Mauritius | Indirectly-elected | 2024 | |
| Mexico | 2024 | 2024 | 2024 |
| (Federated States of Micronesia) Micronesia | Indirectly-elected | 2025 | |
| Moldova | 2024 | 2025 | |
| Monaco | Monarchy | 2023 | |
| Mongolia | 2021 | 2024 | |
| Montserrat | Monarchy | 2024 | |
| Montenegro | 2023 | 2023 | |
| Morocco | Monarchy | 2026 | Indirectly-elected |
| Mozambique | 2024 | 2024 | |
| Myanmar | Indirectly-elected | 2025–26 | 2025–26 |
| Namibia | 2024 | 2024 | Indirectly-elected |
| Nauru | Indirectly-elected (2023) | 2025 | |
| Nepal | Indirectly-elected (2023) | 2026 | Indirectly-elected (2024) |
| Netherlands | Monarchy | 2025 | Indirectly-elected (2023) |
| New Zealand | Monarchy | 2023 | |
| Nicaragua | 2021 | 2021 | |
| Niger | 2020–21 | 2020–21 | |
| Nigeria | 2023 | 2023 | 2023 |
| Niue | Monarchy | 2023 | |
| Northern Cyprus | 2025 | 2022 | |
| North Macedonia | 2024 | 2024 | |
| Norway | Monarchy | 2025 | |
| Oman | Monarchy | 2023 | Appointed |
| Pakistan | Indirectly-elected (2024) | 2024 | Indirectly-elected (2024) |
| Palau | 2024 | 2024 | 2024 |
| Palestine | 2005 | 2006 | |
| Panama | 2024 | 2024 | |
| Papua New Guinea | Monarchy | 2022 | |
| Paraguay | 2023 | 2023 | 2023 |
| Peru | 2026 | 2026 | |
| Philippines | 2022 | 2025 | 2025 |
| Pitcairn Islands | Monarchy | 2023 | |
| Poland | 2025 | 2023 | 2023 |
| Portugal | 2026 | 2025 | |
| Qatar | Monarchy | 2021 | |
| Romania | 2025 | 2024 | 2024 |
| Russia | 2024 | 2026 | Indirectly-elected |
| Rwanda | 2024 | 2024 | Appointed/indirectly-elected |
| Sahrawi Republic | Indirectly-elected (2023) | 2023 | |
| Saint Helena | Monarchy | 2025 | |
| Saint Kitts and Nevis | Monarchy | 2022 | |
| Saint Lucia | Monarchy | 2025 | Appointed |
| Saint Vincent and the Grenadines | Monarchy | 2025 | |
| Samoa | Indirectly-elected (2022) | 2025 | |
| San Marino | Indirectly-elected | 2024 | |
| São Tomé and Príncipe | 2026 | 2026 | |
| Saudi Arabia | Monarchy | Appointed | |
| Senegal | 2024 | 2024 | Appointed/indirectly-elected |
| Serbia | 2022 | 2023 | |
| Seychelles | 2025 | 2025 | |
| Sierra Leone | 2023 | 2023 | |
| Singapore | 2023 | 2025 | |
| Slovakia | 2024 | 2023 | |
| Slovenia | 2022 | 2026 | |
| Solomon Islands | Monarchy | 2024 | |
| Somalia | Indirectly-elected (2022) | Indirectly-elected (2021–2022) | |
| Somaliland | 2024 | 2021 | Appointed |
| South Africa | Indirectly-elected | 2024 | Indirectly-elected |
| South Ossetia | 2026 | 2024 | |
| South Sudan | 2010 | 2010 | Appointed/indirectly-elected |
| Spain | Monarchy | 2023 | 2023 |
| Sri Lanka | 2024 | 2024 | |
| Sudan | Provisional | Provisional | |
| Suriname | Indirectly-elected | 2025 | |
| Sweden | Monarchy | 2022 | |
| Switzerland | Indirectly-elected | 2023 | 2023 |
| Syria | 2021 | Appointed/indirectly-elected (2025–2026) | |
| Tajikistan | 2020 | 2025 | Appointed/indirectly-elected |
| Tanzania | 2025 | 2025 | |
| Thailand | Monarchy | 2026 | Indirectly-elected (2024) |
| Togo | 2025 | 2024 | |
| Tonga | Monarchy | 2025 | |
| Transnistria | 2021 | 2025 | |
| Trinidad and Tobago | Indirectly-elected | 2025 | Appointed |
| Tunisia | 2024 | 2022–2023 | |
| Turkey | 2023 | 2023 | |
| Turkmenistan | 2022 | 2023 | |
| Turks and Caicos Islands | Monarchy | 2025 | |
| Tuvalu | Monarchy | 2024 | |
| Uganda | 2026 | 2026 | |
| Ukraine | 2019 | 2019 | |
| United Arab Emirates | Monarchy | 2023 | |
| United Kingdom | Monarchy | 2024 | Appointed |
| United States | 2024 | 2024 | 2024 |
| Uruguay | 2024 | 2024 | 2024 |
| Uzbekistan | 2023 | 2024 | Appointed/indirectly-elected |
| Vanuatu | Indirectly-elected (2025) | 2025 | |
| Vatican City | Elective monarchy (2025) | Appointed | |
| Venezuela | 2024 | 2025 | |
| Vietnam | Indirectly-elected | 2026 | |
| Yemen | 2012 | 2003 | |
| Zambia | 2026 | 2026 | |
| Zimbabwe | 2023 | 2023 | 2023 |

== See also ==
- List of next general elections
