= 2028 Austrian presidential election =

- 2028
Incumbent President
Alexander Van der Bellen
Greens

Presidential elections will likely be held in Austria in 2028. Incumbent president Alexander Van der Bellen is term-limited and is ineligible to run for re-election.

== Electoral system ==
The president of Austria is directly elected for a six-year term in a two-round system: if no candidate receives more than 50% of valid votes cast in the first round, then a second ballot occurs in which only those two candidates who received the greatest number of votes in the first round may stand.

The constitution grants the president the power to appoint the Chancellor and, by extension, federal cabinet ministers, Supreme Court justices, military officers, and most major bureaucrats. The president may dissolve the National Council. In practice, however, the president acts as a figurehead.

Austrian citizens who have reached the age of 16 by the end of the day of the election and who are not excluded from voting by a judicial conviction are entitled to vote. Candidates must be at least 35 years old to be eligible to run for election. As a prerequisite for running as a candidate for federal president, at least 6,000 declarations of support (= valid signatures of eligible voters) must be submitted to the federal electoral authority set up at the Ministry of the Interior together with the formal candidate declaration. At the same time, a candidate fee of €3,600 must be paid.

== Potential candidates ==
The following people have declared their intention to run or are speculated as possible contenders.

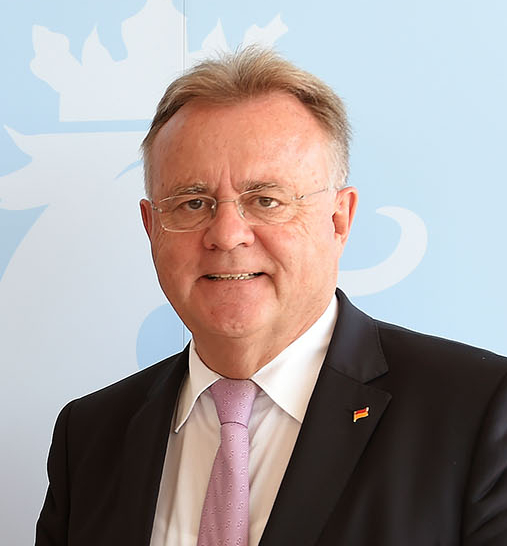
Hans Niessl
(SPÖ)

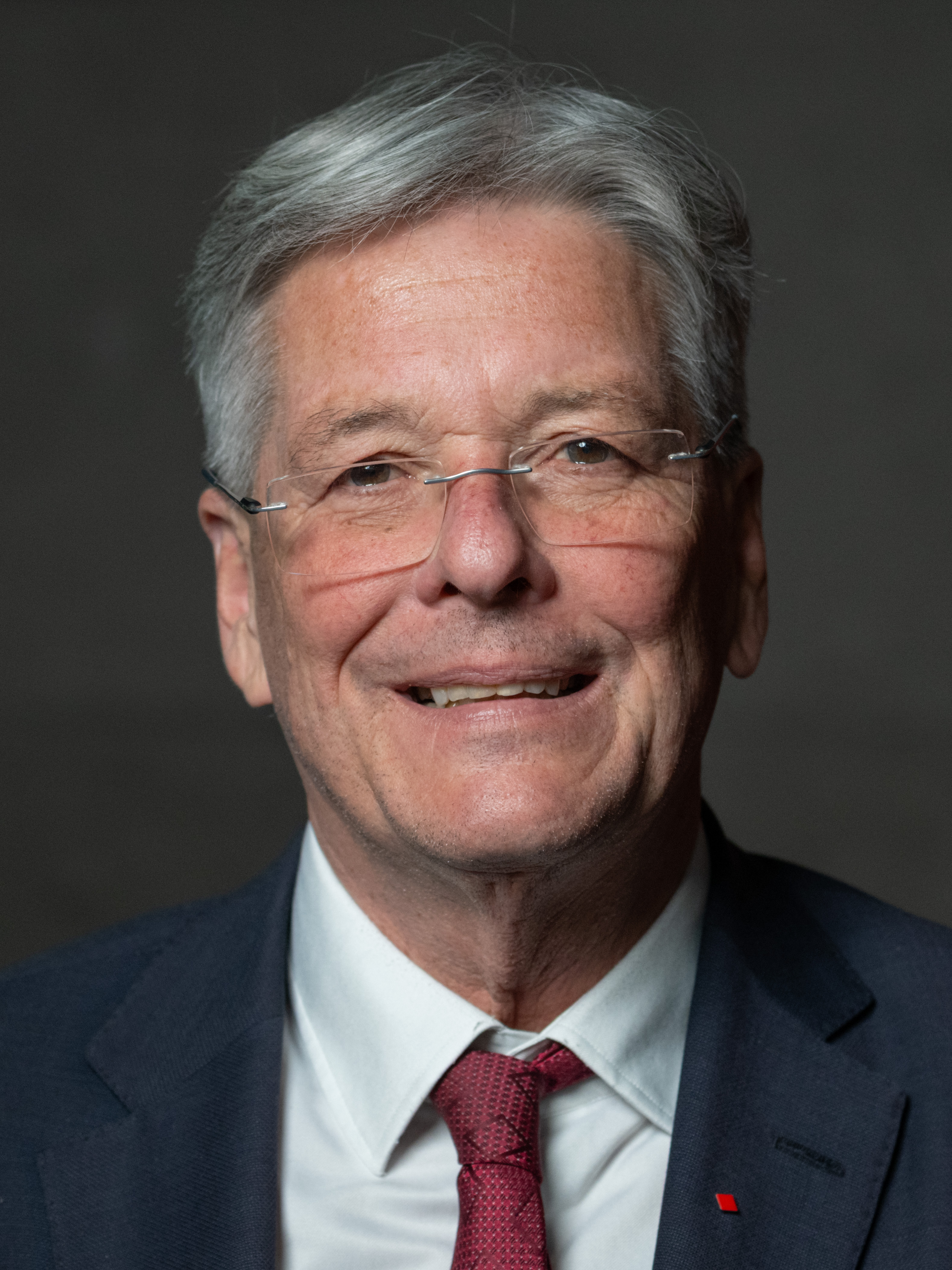
Peter Kaiser
(SPÖ)

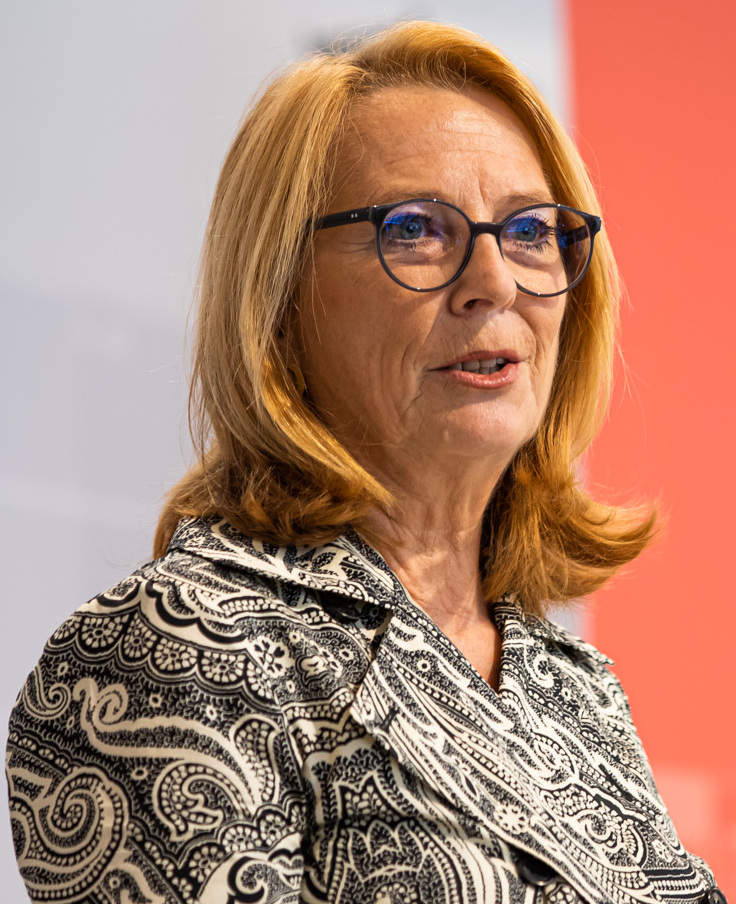
Doris Bures
(SPÖ)

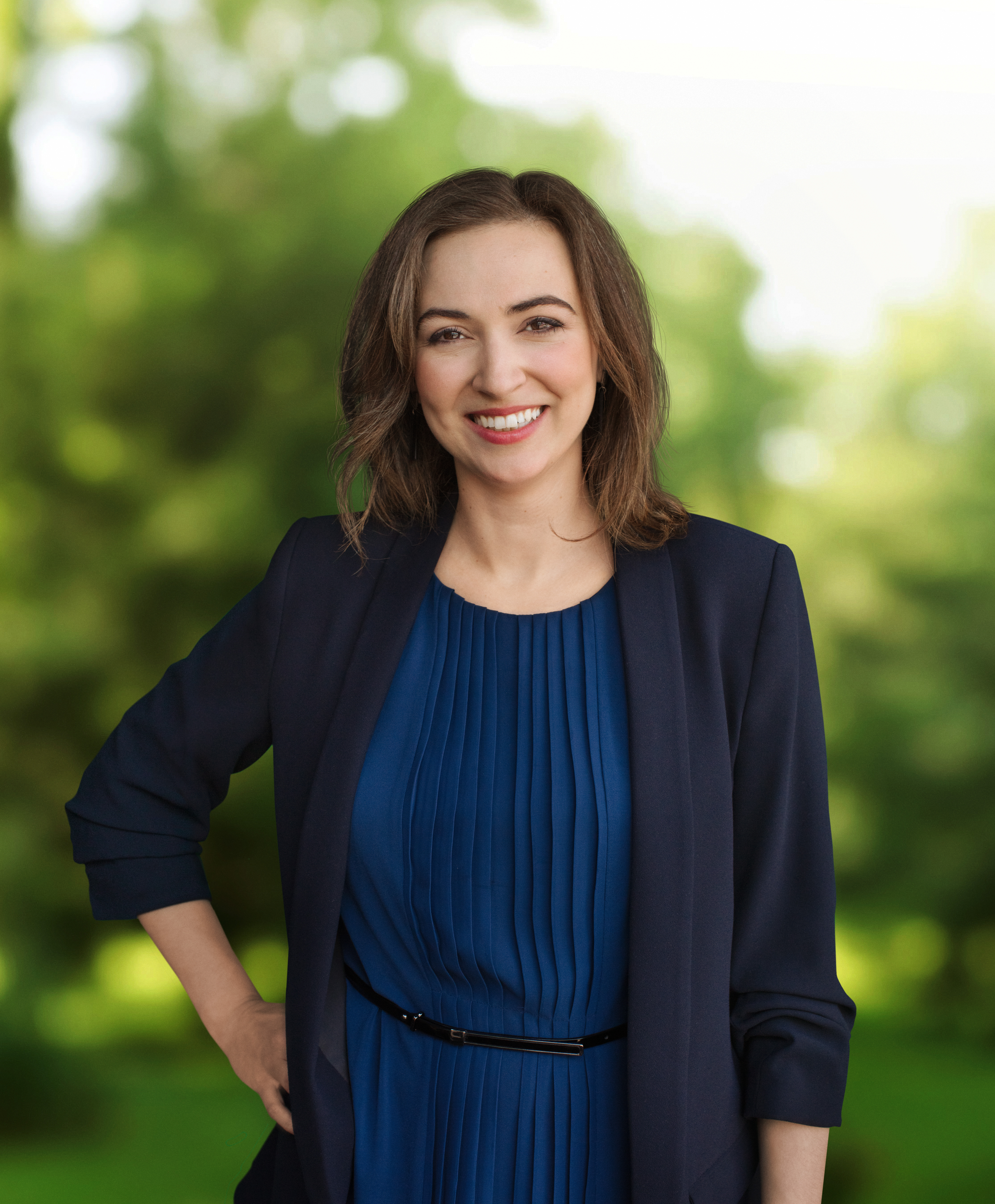
Alma Zadić
(Greens)

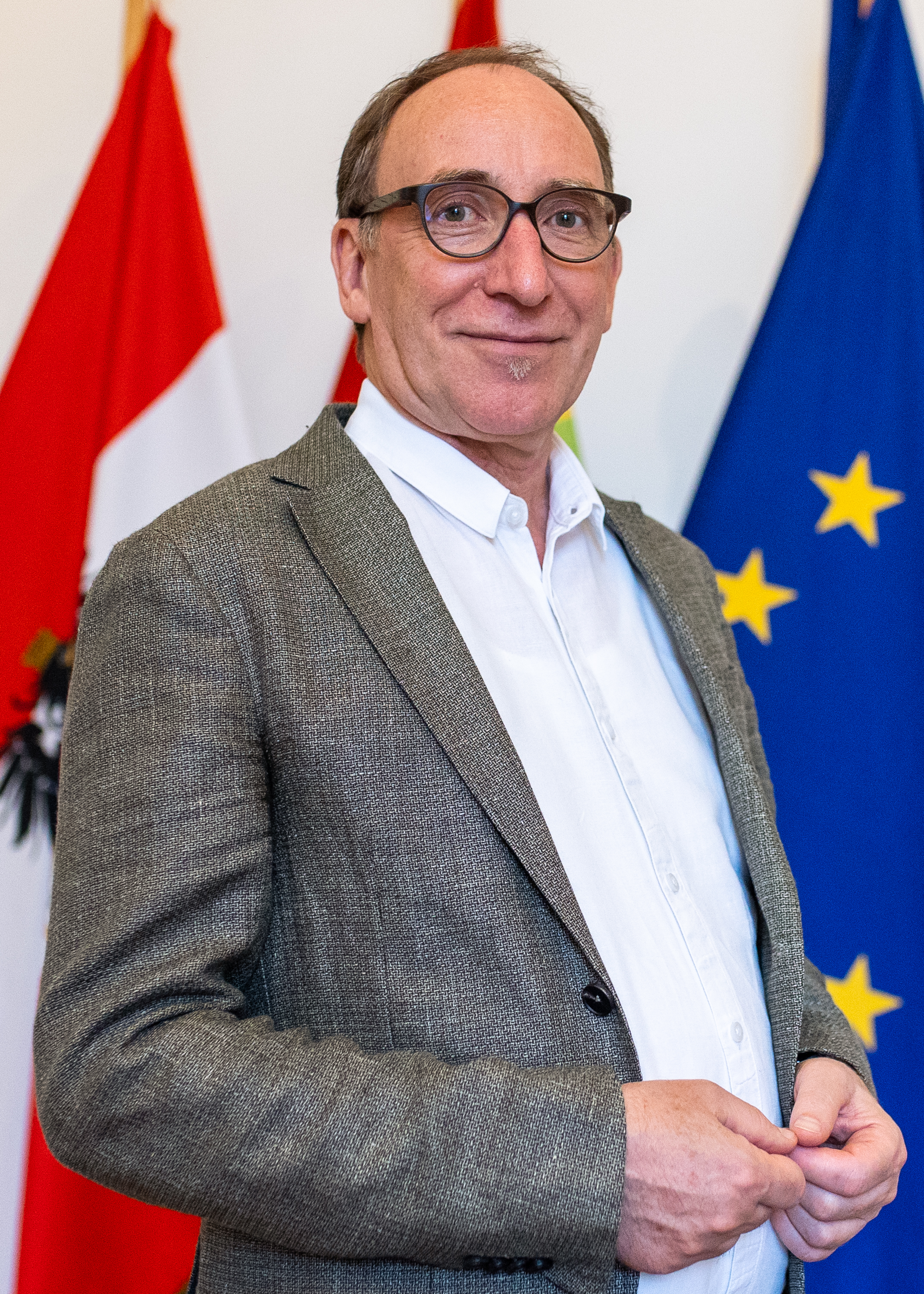
Johannes Rauch
(Greens)

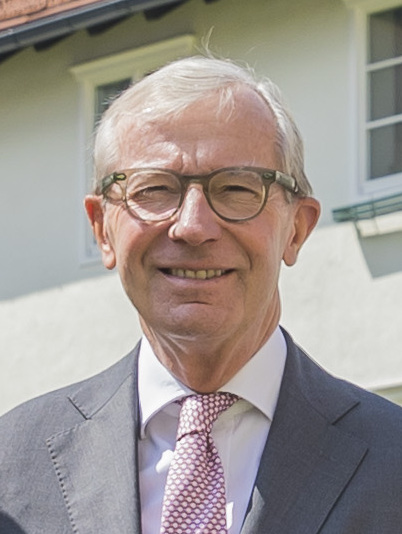
Wilfried Haslauer
(ÖVP)

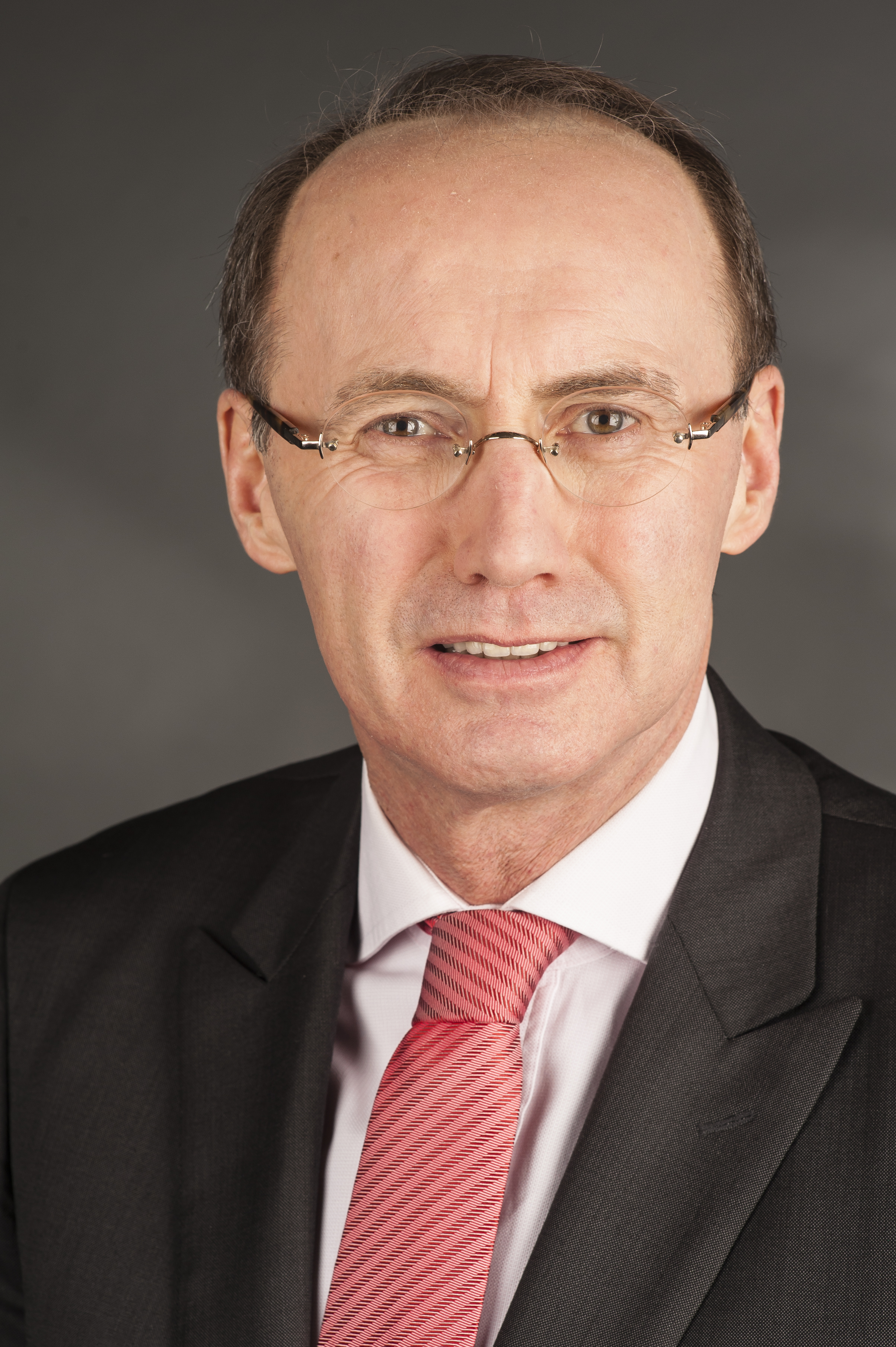
Othmar Karas
(ÖVP)

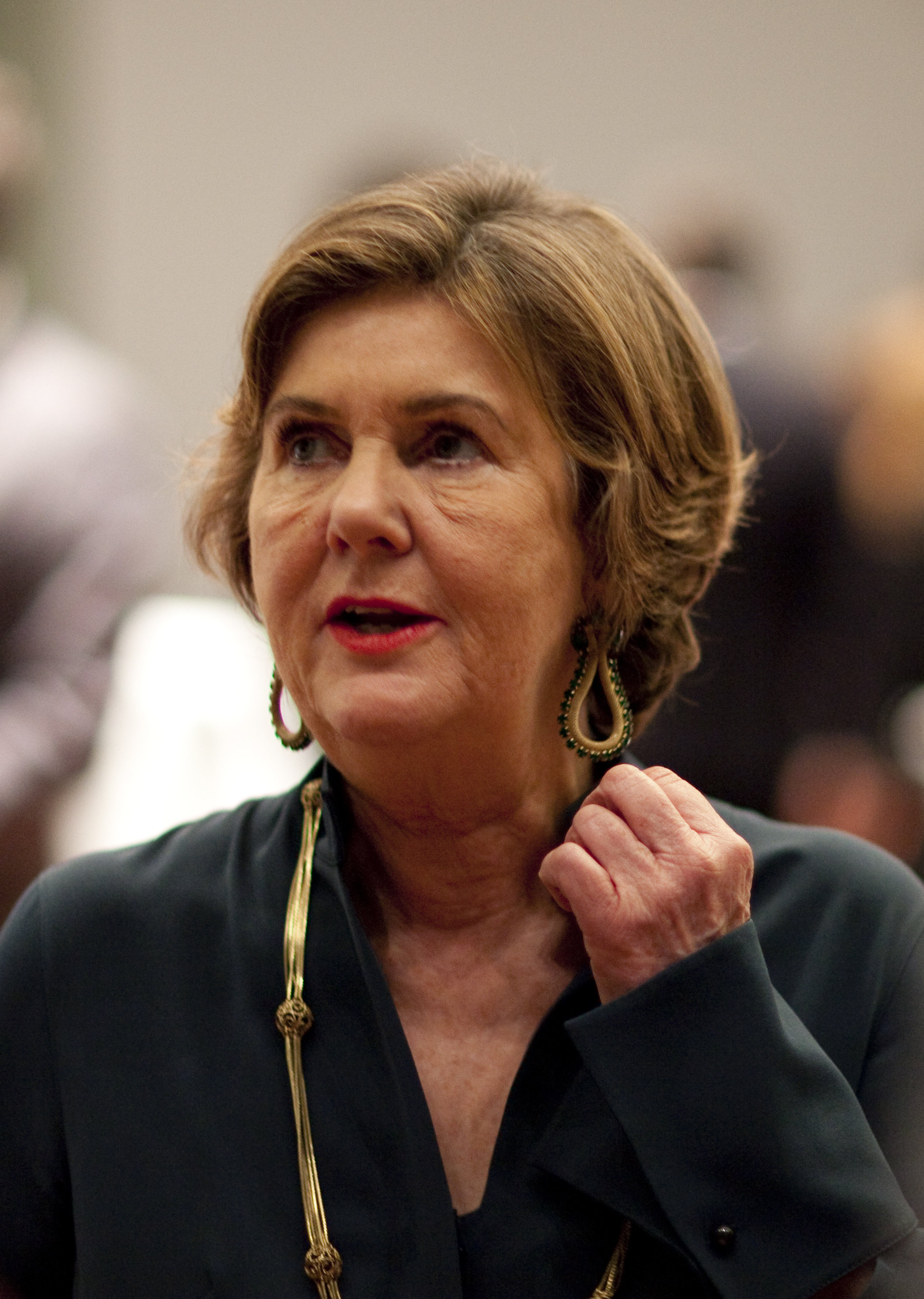
Helga Rabl-Stadler
(ÖVP)

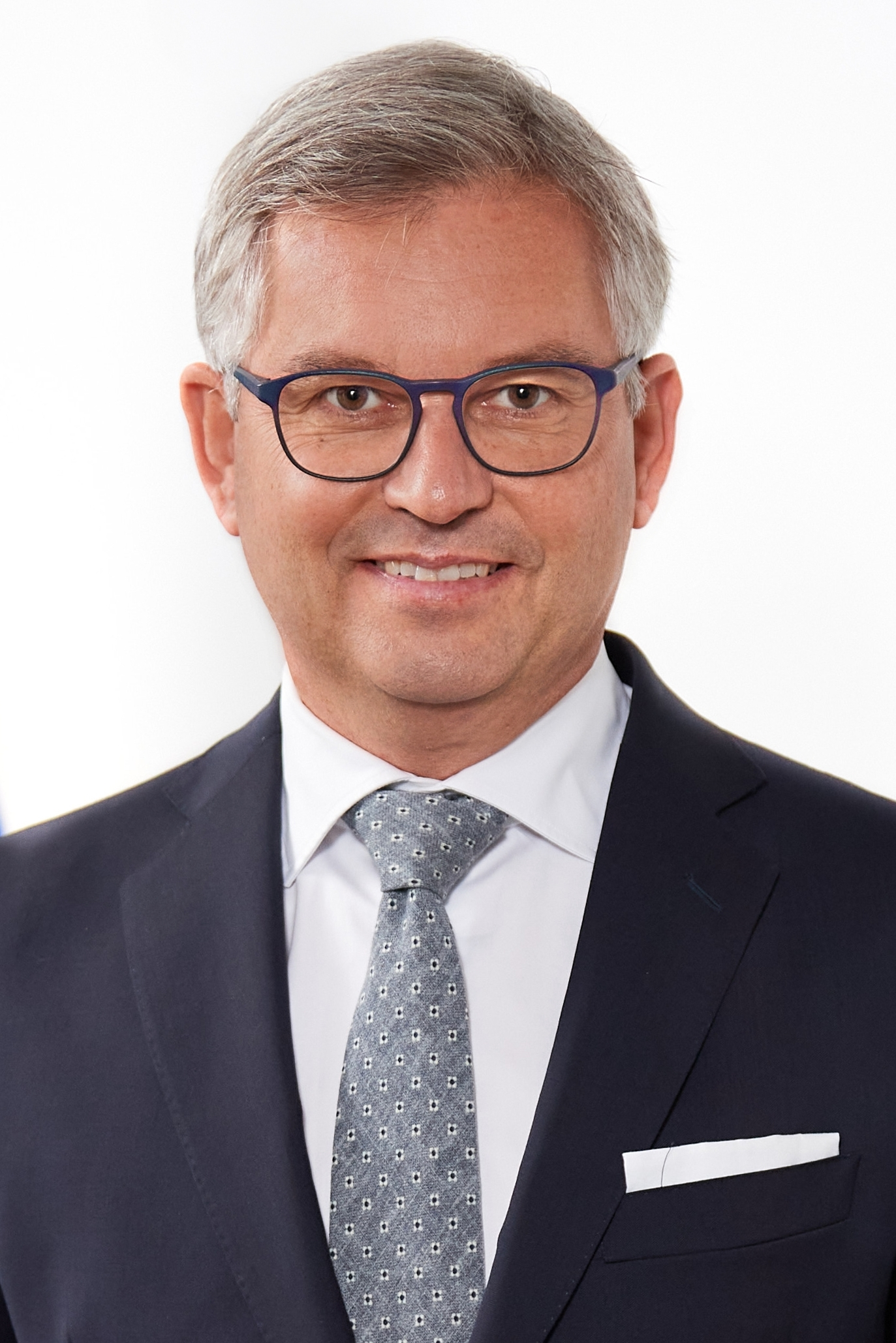
Magnus Brunner
(ÖVP)

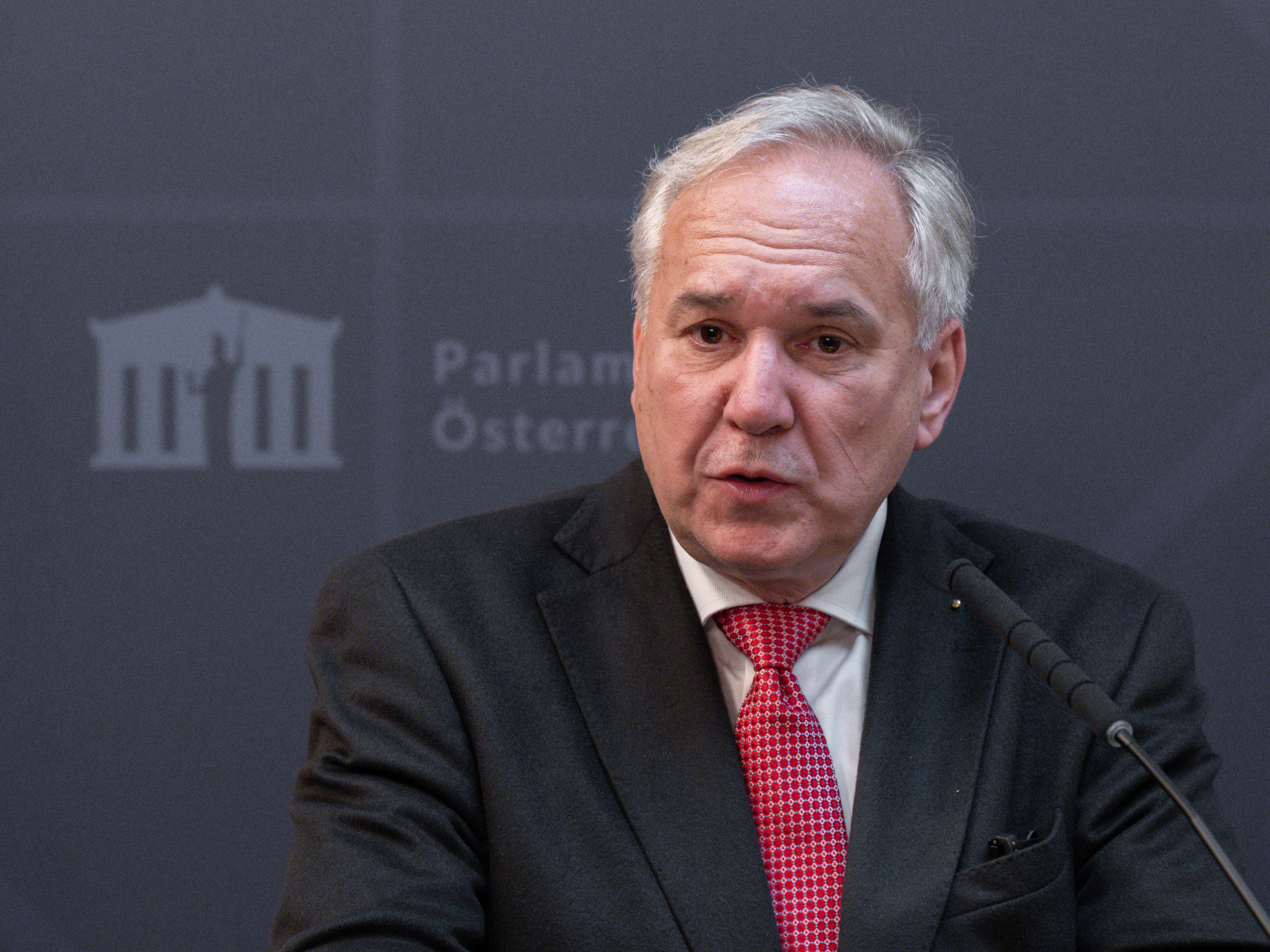
Walter Rosenkranz
(FPÖ)

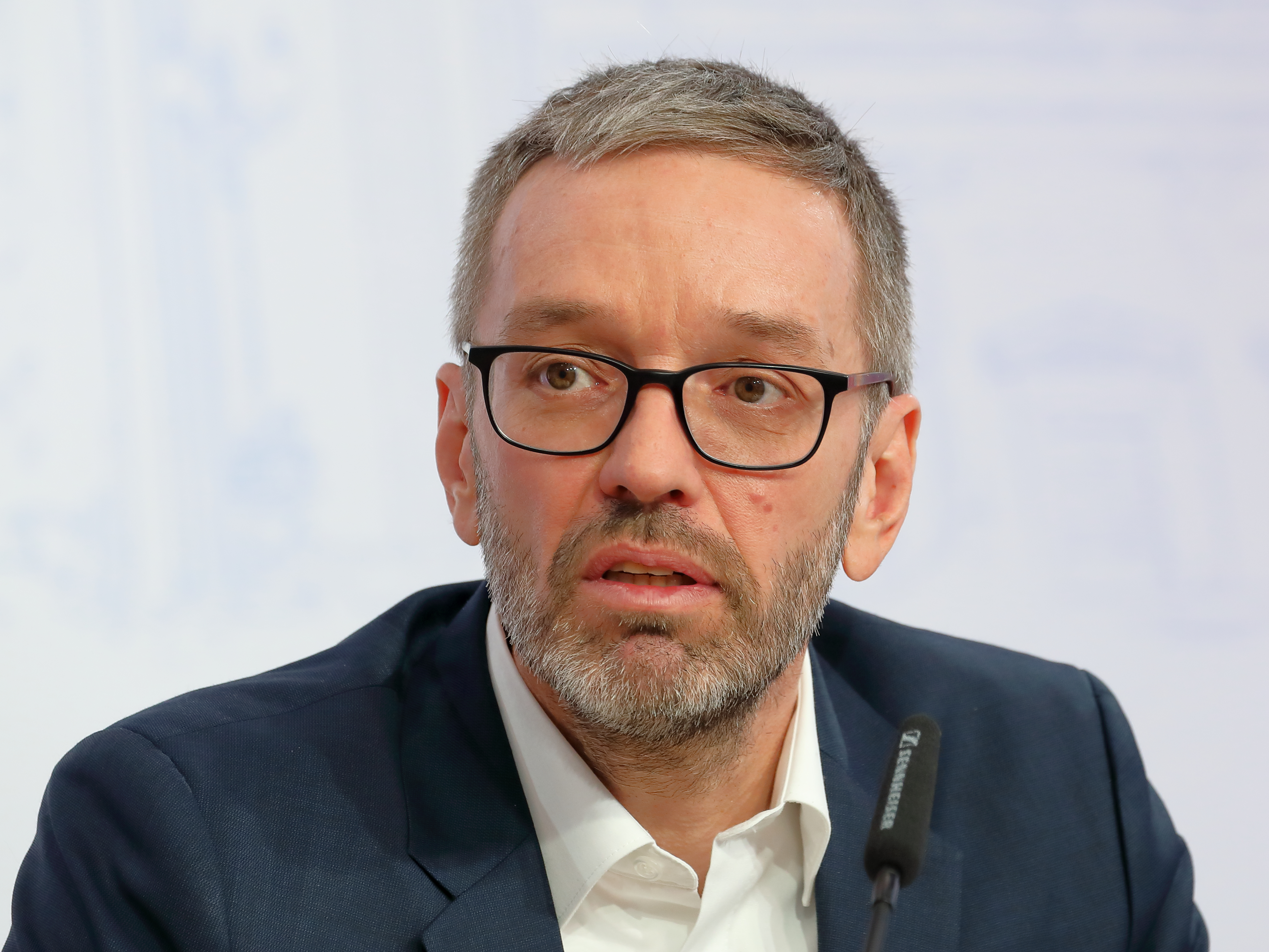
Herbert Kickl
(FPÖ)

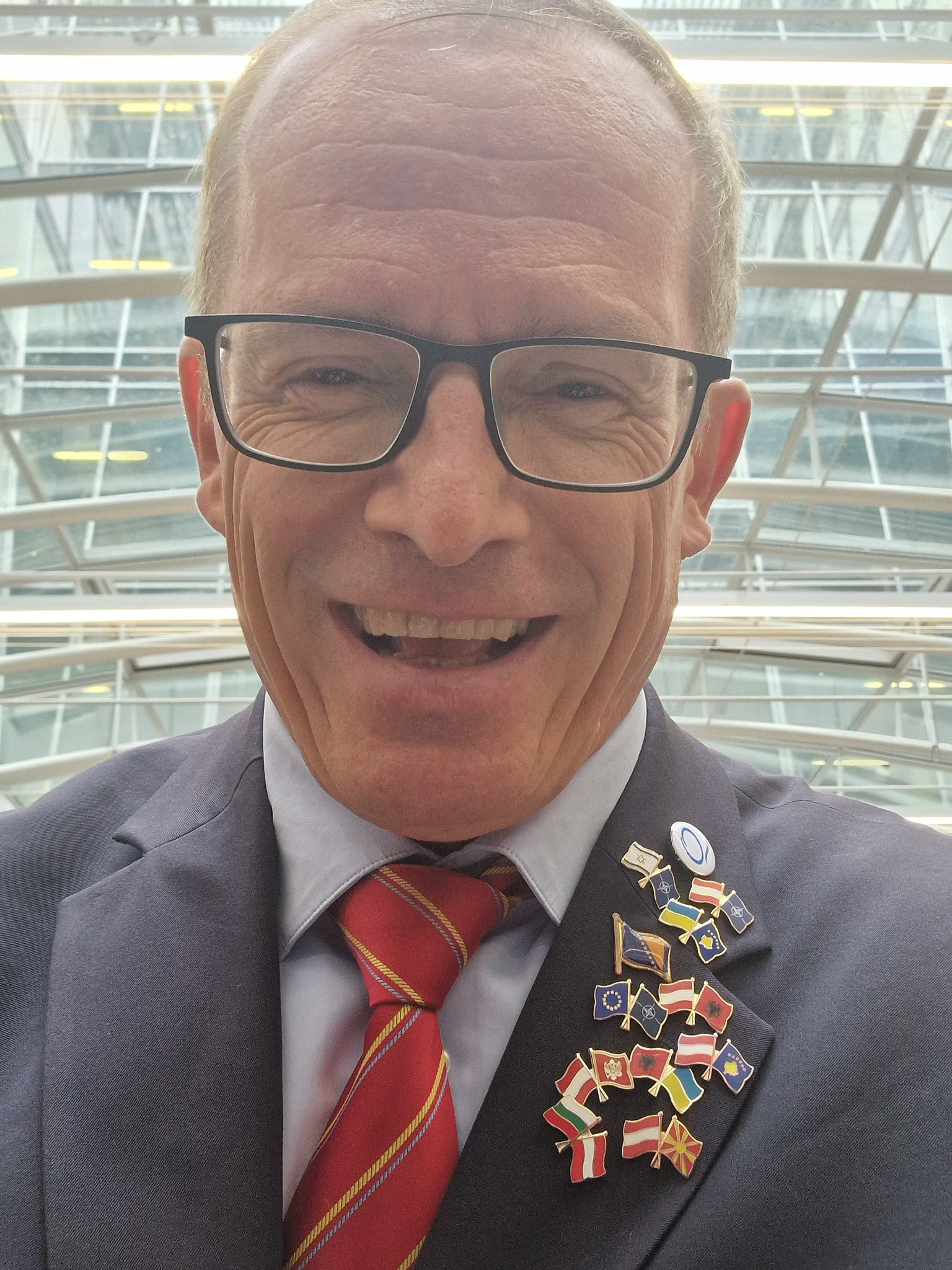
Günther Fehlinger (Independent)
