= Next Mauritian general election =

← 2024	By November 2029
- Constituencies used for the 2024 general election
Incumbent Prime Minister
Navin Ramgoolam
Labour

General elections are scheduled to be held in Mauritius by November 2029.

== Electoral system ==
The National Assembly has 62 directly elected members; 60 represent 20 three-seat constituencies, and two are elected from a constituency on the island of Rodrigues. The elections are held using the plurality block vote system, whereby voters have as many votes as seats available. In what is commonly known as the Best Loser System, should a community fail to win parliamentary representation, the Electoral Supervisory Commission can appoint up to eight unsuccessful candidates from these communities with the most votes. The Electoral Commission divides the electorate into four communities: Hindus, Muslims, Sino-Mauritians and the General Population; the latter comprises voters who do not belong to the first three. Unless the president dissolves the National Assembly early, members serve a five-year term.

Eligible candidates and voters are required to be at least 18 years old, citizens of the Commonwealth and have resided in Mauritius for at least two years before the nomination date. Since 2014, it has been optional for candidates to declare which community they belong to. Contestants who refuse to affiliate with a community are ineligible for a Best Loser nomination. Candidates have to be proficient enough in English to participate in parliamentary procedures. They also require the nomination from at least six electors in their constituency and a deposit to be paid, which is refunded if they obtain at least 10% of the vote. Individuals ineligible to be contestants include those who have committed electoral offences, have served a prison sentence exceeding 12 months, have undisclosed government contracts or have undisclosed bankruptcy.
