= 2028 Iranian presidential election =

- TBD
- Provinces of Iran
Incumbent President
Masoud Pezeshkian
Independent

Presidential elections are scheduled to be held in the Islamic Republic of Iran in 2028, to elect the president for a term of four years. In the 2024 election, which was a snap election, incumbent Masoud Pezeshkian was elected as the President of Iran.

== Candidates ==
=== Potential ===
- Mahmoud Ahmadinejad, member of the Expediency Discernment Council (2013–present) and former President (2005–2013)
- Mohammad Bagher Ghalibaf, Speaker of the Islamic Consultative Assembly (2020–present), former Mayor of Tehran (2005–2017), and candidate for President in 2005, 2013, 2017, and 2024
- Alireza Zakani, Special Representative to the President for Affairs of Management of Social Damages in Tehran (2023–present) and mayor of Tehran (2021–present)
- Saeed Jalili, member of the Expediency Discernment Council (2013–present), former Secretary of the Supreme National Security Council (2007–2013), and candidate for President in 2013, 2017 and 2024

=== Declined ===
- Masoud Pezeshkian, incumbent President (2024–present)

== See also ==
- Iranian presidential election
- President of Iran
- List of Presidents of Iran
