= 2028 Tuvaluan general election =

- by January 2028
Incumbent Prime Minister
Feleti Teo

General elections are scheduled to be held in Tuvalu by January 2028.

== Electoral system ==
The 16 members of parliament are elected from eight two-seat constituencies via plurality block voting. There are no formal political parties in Tuvalu, so all candidates contest as independents. Candidates are required to be Tuvaluan citizens and at least 21 years old. If, by the registration deadline, no more than two eligible candidates have registered to run in a constituency, these nominees are then, on that day, declared by law to be elected. Candidates have until the day before the election to withdraw if they wish to. All citizens aged 18 and older are eligible to vote; voting is not compulsory.
