= 2031 Portuguese presidential election =

- January 2031
- Opinion polls
Incumbent President
António José Seguro
PS

A presidential election will be held in Portugal in January 2031. The incumbent President António José Seguro, supported by the Socialist Party (PS), is eligible for a second term.

== Background ==
António José Seguro was elected in the second round with 66.8% of the votes, after defeating André Ventura who received only 33.2%. He was sworn into office on 9 March 2026 and since then has been in cohabitation with Social Democratic Prime Minister Luís Montenegro.

Within the Portuguese political system, the president serves as the head of state with primarily ceremonial duties, though the president holds some political influence and can dissolve Parliament during a crisis. The president resides at the Belém Palace in Lisbon. Since the Carnation Revolution, all Portuguese presidents have been re-elected for a second term and never tried a third, with one exception: Mário Soares (PS), who sought a non-consecutive third term in the 2006 presidential election but lost. Thus, every president since 1976 has served exactly two terms.

== Electoral system ==
To stand for election, candidates must be of Portuguese origin and over 35 years old, gather 7,500 signatures of support one month before the election, and submit them to the Constitutional Court of Portugal. Then, the Constitutional Court has to certify if the candidacies submitted meet the requirements to appear on the ballot. A candidate must receive a majority of votes (50% plus one vote) to be elected. If no candidate achieves a majority in the first round, a runoff election (i.e., second round, held between the two candidates who receive the most votes in the first round) has to be held. The highest number of candidacies ever accepted was eleven, in 2026. Since the Carnation Revolution, there have only been two runoff elections, in the 1986 presidential election, when Diogo Freitas do Amaral (46.3% of votes in the first round and 48.8% in the second) lost to Mário Soares (25.4% in the first round and 51.2% in the second), and in the 2026 presidential election, when António José Seguro (31.1% of the votes in the first round and 66.8% in the second) won against André Ventura (23.5% in the first round and 33.2% in the second).

== Candidates ==
=== Potential ===
- António José Seguro – incumbent President since 2026; former Secretary-general of the Socialist Party (2011–2014);
- Henrique Gouveia e Melo – former Chief of the Naval Staff (2021–2024); candidate in the previous presidential election;
- João Cotrim de Figueiredo – incumbent MEP since 2024; former President of the Liberal Initiative (2019–2023); candidate in the previous presidential election;
- Pedro Santana Lopes – incumbent Mayor of Figueira da Foz since 2021 (also 1997–2001); former Prime Minister (2004–2005); former President of the Social Democratic Party (2004–2005); former Mayor of Lisbon (2001–2004; 2005);
- Vitorino Silva – former President of React, Include, Recycle (2019–2022); former President of the Parish Council of Rans (1994–2002); candidate in the 2016 and 2021 presidential elections.
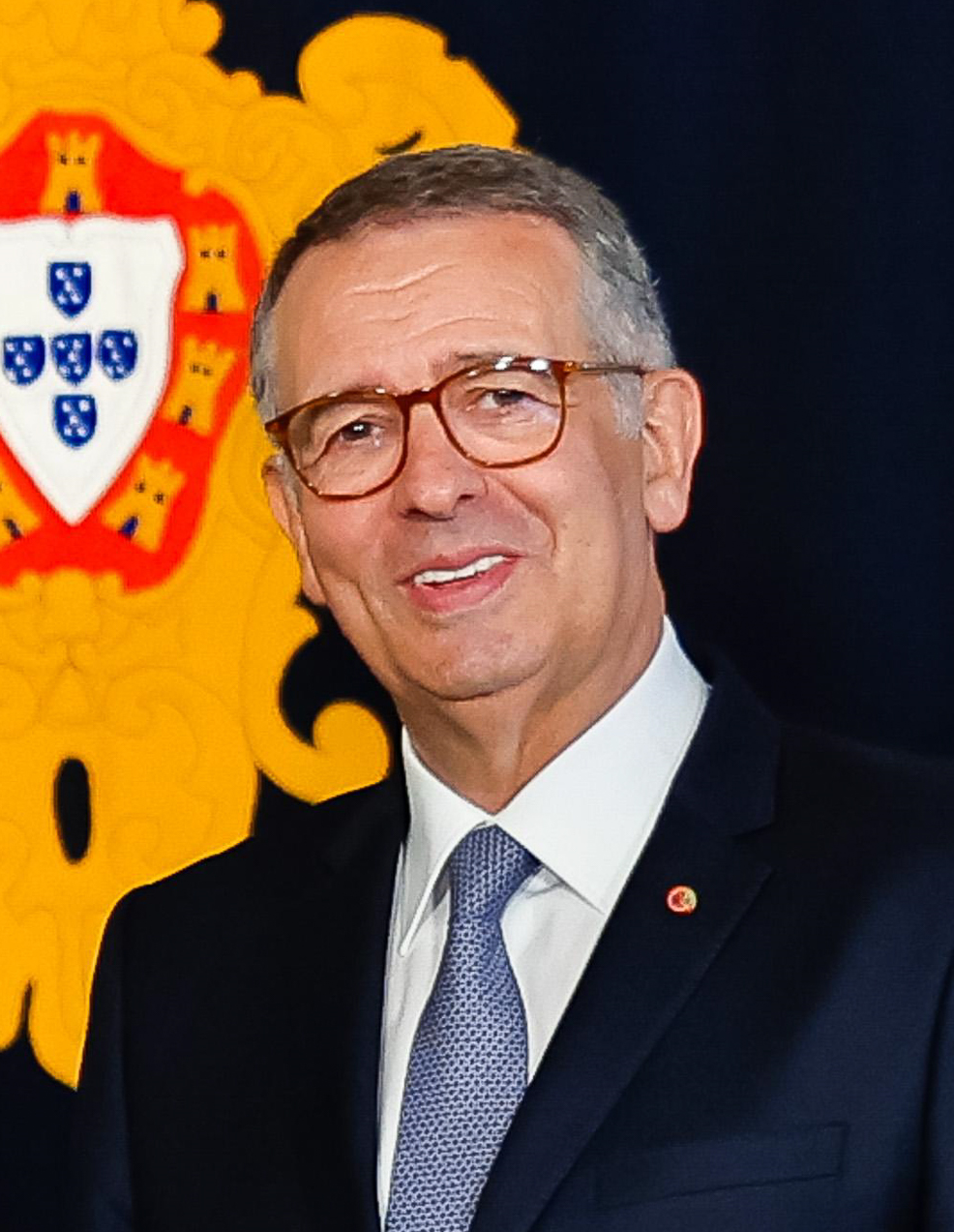
President
António José Seguro

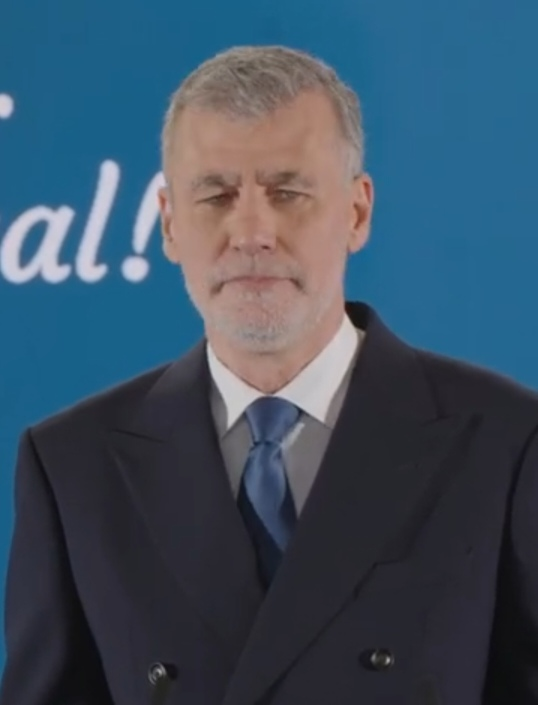
Former Chief of Naval Staff
Henrique Gouveia e Melo

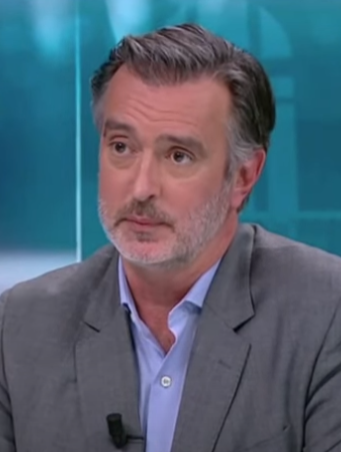
MEP
João Cotrim de Figueiredo

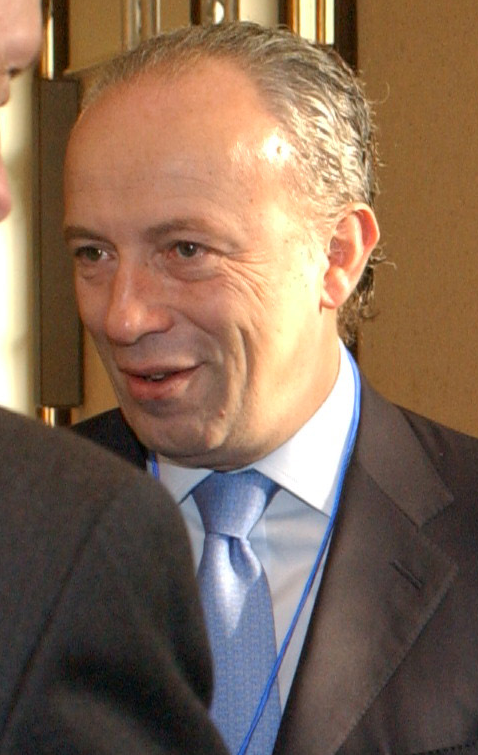
Mayor of Figueira da Foz
Pedro Santana Lopes

== See also ==
- President of Portugal
- Politics of Portugal
