= Next Mozambican general election =

- by October 2029
- Presidential election
Incumbent President
Daniel Chapo
FRELIMO

General elections are expected to be held in Mozambique by October 2029.

== Electoral system ==
The president is elected using the two-round system. The 250 members of the Assembly of the Republic are elected by proportional representation in eleven multi-member constituencies based on the country's provinces and on a first-past-the-post basis from two single-member constituencies representing Mozambican citizens in Africa and Europe. Seats in the multi-member constituencies are allocated using the d'Hondt method, with an electoral threshold of 5%. Official results are announced by the National Election Commission (CNE) after 15 days and must subsequently be validated by the Constitutional Council.
