= 2030 Zimbabwean presidential election =

Upcoming indirect presidential election in Zimbabwe

- August / September 2030
Incumbent President
Emmerson Mnangagwa
ZANU-PF

The 2030 Zimbabwean presidential election will be the first presidential election conducted under the indirect system introduced by the Constitution of Zimbabwe Amendment (No. 3) Act, 2026. It will be held by a joint sitting of the Senate and the National Assembly shortly after the general election due no later than 5 August 2030. The election will determine the successor to incumbent President Emmerson Mnangagwa, whose term has been extended until 2030 by transitional provisions in the Act.

This will be the first time since 1987 that the President of Zimbabwe is elected by Parliament rather than by direct popular vote.

== Background ==
Indirect election of the president has historical precedents in Zimbabwe's post-independence era. Under the Lancaster House Constitution of 1980, Canaan Banana was elected by the newly constituted Parliament as the country's first ceremonial president on 18 April 1980, shortly after independence; he was chosen to provide ethnic balance in the new government, as the main opposition leader Joshua Nkomo had declined the largely figurehead post. There was no separate presidential election in 1985; the general election held that year was for Parliament only, and Banana continued to serve as ceremonial president until the end of his term. In late 1987, Parliament amended the Constitution to abolish the office of Prime Minister and create an executive presidency combining the roles of head of state and head of government. On 31 December 1987, Robert Mugabe was declared Zimbabwe's first executive president through this parliamentary process, succeeding Banana.

The 2013 Constitution originally provided for direct election of the president by popular vote for a five-year term, renewable once. Following the 2023 general election, President Emmerson Mnangagwa of ZANU–PF began his second term.

In 2026, Parliament passed the Constitution of Zimbabwe Amendment (No. 3) Act, which was assented to by President Emmerson Mnangagwa on 7 July 2026. The Act extended presidential and parliamentary terms from five to seven years and replaced direct popular election of the president with election by a joint sitting of Parliament. Transitional provisions allow the current president to remain in office until 2030.

The next general election — which will elect the members of Parliament who will then choose the president — must be held no later than thirty days before the expiry of the current seven-year parliamentary term on 4 September 2030 — that is, by 5 August 2030.

== Electoral system ==
Under the new section 92 of the Constitution (as amended in 2026), the president is elected by the members of Parliament in a joint sitting of the Senate and the National Assembly.

The process is as follows:

- A general election is held to elect all members of the National Assembly and 60 elected members of the Senate.
- After the election results are declared, the first sitting of the new Parliament must take place no later than fourteen days later (amended section 145).
- The Senate and National Assembly then elect their presiding officers (President of the Senate and Speaker of the National Assembly).
- A joint sitting of both houses is convened shortly thereafter to elect the president.

To win, a candidate must receive more than half of the valid votes cast by members of Parliament. If no candidate achieves this in the first ballot, a run-off is held between the two candidates with the highest number of votes. The election is conducted by the Zimbabwe Electoral Commission in accordance with electoral law and the Standing Orders of Parliament.

A person elected president who was previously a Member of Parliament ceases to be an MP upon assuming office. In the event of a vacancy during a term, a new president must be elected by joint sitting within thirty days.

== Composition of the electing body ==
The electing body will consist of all members of the Senate and the National Assembly elected in the general election due by 5 August 2030. This will be the first Parliament elected under the new seven-year term and the expanded Senate.

The political composition of the joint sitting will depend on the outcome of the 2030 general election. ZANU–PF currently holds a large majority in both houses, but internal factional dynamics and the performance of opposition parties (including the weakened Citizens Coalition for Change and any new movements) will determine the balance of power in the electing body.

== Current political situation ==
As of July 2026, ZANU–PF remains the dominant party but is affected by internal succession tensions, particularly between factions aligned with President Mnangagwa and those supporting Vice President Constantino Chiwenga. The 2026 constitutional amendments have been controversial, with critics arguing they undermine democratic accountability and term limits, while supporters claim they provide stability for Vision 2030.

The opposition remains fragmented following years of recalls and internal disputes. The composition of the Parliament elected in 2030 will be decisive in determining whether ZANU–PF can secure the votes needed to elect its preferred candidate or whether cross-party support or opposition strength could influence the outcome.

Upcoming state and local elections, by-elections, and internal party congresses between 2026 and 2030 will further shape the political landscape before the 2030 general election.

== Potential candidates ==
As of mid-2026, no official candidates have been nominated. Speculation centres on senior ZANU–PF figures and possible opposition contenders.

=== ZANU–PF ===
==== Constantino Chiwenga ====
Vice President Constantino Chiwenga is widely regarded as the leading potential successor within ZANU–PF for the 2030 election cycle. In October 2025 he circulated a dossier alleging systemic corruption among senior figures in the Mnangagwa administration. The document provoked strong internal criticism, with Mnangagwa and allies labelling it “treasonous”. Analysts viewed the episode as part of Chiwenga’s positioning ahead of the succession.

==== Kudakwashe Tagwirei ====
Businessman Kudakwashe Tagwirei, a major financier and close ally of President Mnangagwa, was co-opted into ZANU–PF’s Central Committee in 2025. Some analysts interpreted this as an attempt by Mnangagwa to position Tagwirei as a potential successor, further complicating internal factional dynamics.

=== Opposition ===
==== Nelson Chamisa ====
Following Chamisa's resignation from the CCC in January 2024, the opposition has remained fragmented. The Citizens Coalition for Change (CCC) has been severely weakened by recalls initiated by self-proclaimed secretary-general Sengezo Tshabangu, enabling ZANU–PF to gain seats in by-elections without contest. Following Chamisa's resignation in January 2024 he indicated plans to launch a new political movement; as of July 2026 no formal party structure has been established, and he has been reported to have relocated to the United States.

==== David Coltart ====
Following his election as mayor of Bulawayo in 2023, Coltart has remained at the forefront of opposition politics, in particular calling into question the process by which Constitution of Zimbabwe Amendment (No. 3) was introduced, and also being considered a potential candidate for the 2030 election cycle.

Any candidate will need to secure majority support in the joint sitting, making alliances and cross-party negotiations critical.

== See also ==
- President of Zimbabwe
- 2023 Zimbabwean general election
- Constitution of Zimbabwe Amendment (No. 3) Act, 2026
- Politics of Zimbabwe
