= 2029 Tunisian presidential election =

- by October 2029
Incumbent President
Kais Saied
Independent

Presidential elections are scheduled to be held in Tunisia by October 2029.

== Electoral system ==
The President of Tunisia is elected using the two-round system; if no candidate receives a majority of the vote in the first round, a second round will be held.
