= 2029 Liberian general election =

- by October 2029
- Presidential election
Incumbent President
Joseph Boakai
UP

General elections are scheduled to be held in Liberia by October 2029. Additionally, elections for the Senate are scheduled to be held by December of the same year. Incumbent President Joseph Boakai is eligible for reelection, having won his first term in 2023 over George Weah.

== Electoral system ==
The president is elected using the two-round system, while the 73 members of the House of Representatives are elected by first-past-the-post voting in single-member constituencies.

== Potential candidates ==
=== Declared presidential candidates ===
- Musa Bility, member of the House of Representatives and leader of the Citizens Movement for Change
- Nyahn K. Vehyee, leader of the Democratic Justice Party
