= Next Guinea-Bissau general election =

- TBD
- Presidential election
- Regions of Guinea-Bissau
Incumbent Transitional President
Horta Inta-A Na Man
Independent
- Parliamentary election
- All 65 seats in the National People's Assembly; 33 seats needed for a majority
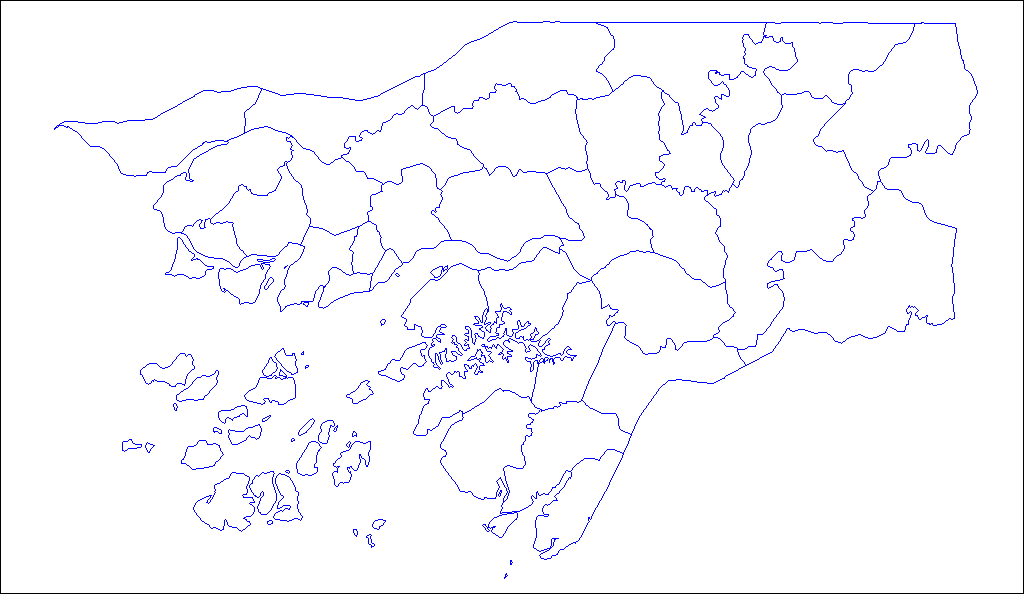
Sectors of Guinea-Bissau
Prime Minister before	Prime Minister after
Ilídio Vieira Té; PRS	TBD

General elections will be held in Guinea-Bissau at an unknown date to elect the president and members of the National People's Assembly. The date was set by the High Military Command for the Restoration of Order, which seized power in a coup d'état on 26 November 2025 that came before the release of the results of the 2025 Guinea-Bissau general election on 23 November, which was annulled.

The elections were initially scheduled for 6 December 2026 before being delayed.

== Background ==
General elections were held in Guinea-Bissau on 23 November 2025 to elect the president and members of the National People's Assembly. A few days later, the Revolutionary Armed Forces of the People staged a coup d'état that overthrew president Umaro Sissoco Embaló, suspended the electoral protest and installed General Horta Inta-A Na Man as leader of a junta calling itself the High Military Command for the Restoration of Order that would run the country for a one-year transitional period. The junta released a transitional charter in December 2025 that banned Horta from running for election. On 21 January 2026, the junta issued a decree authorising elections for the legislature and the presidency to be held on 6 December 2026, after it deemed that "all the conditions for organising free, fair and transparent elections have been met".

== Electoral system ==
The president is elected using the two-round system. Article 33 of Guinea-Bissau's Electoral Law prohibits the publishing of any opinion polls.

Due to a constitutional amendment approved in a referendum earlier in the year, the 65 members of the National People's Assembly (previously 102) are elected by two methods. 63 (previously 100) by closed list proportional representation from 12 (previously 29) multi-member constituencies and two from single-member constituencies representing expatriate citizens in Africa and Europe.
