= 2029 Algerian presidential election =

← 2024	by September 2029	2034 →
Incumbent President
Abdelmadjid Tebboune
Independent

Presidential elections are scheduled to be held in Algeria by September 2029.

== Electoral system ==
The President of Algeria is elected using the two-round system; if no candidate receives a majority of the vote in the first round, a second round will be held.
