= 2029 Mauritanian presidential election =

- by June 2029
Incumbent President
Mohamed Ould Ghazouani
El Insaf

Presidential elections are scheduled to be held in Mauritania by June 2029.

== Electoral system ==
Under Article 26 of the constitution the president is elected for a five-year term using the two-round system. If no candidate receives an absolute majority of the vote in the first round, a second round is held two weeks later between the two candidates who received the most votes.

Candidacy is restricted to citizens by birth aged between 40 and 75 (on the day of the first round) who have not had their civil and political rights removed. Article 23 also stipulates that the President has to be a Muslim. Article 28 establishes a term limit of two mandates, allowing the President to only be re-elected once.

The election of a new president is required to take place between 30 and 45 days before the expiration of the term of the incumbent president.
