= 2027 Spanish regional elections =

- 23 May 2027

At least 381 seats in the regional parliaments of Asturias, Cantabria, Castilla–La Mancha, La Rioja, Madrid, Murcia and Navarre
Current regional administrations by leading party
National parties
PP (11+2)
PSOE (3)
Regional parties
PSC (Note: PSOE's sister party in Catalonia.) (1)
EAJ/PNV (1)
CCa (1)

Regional elections will be held in Spain during 2027 to elect the regional parliaments of at least seven of the seventeen autonomous communities: Asturias, Cantabria, Castilla–La Mancha, La Rioja, Madrid, Murcia and Navarre, with regional elections also being likely in the Balearic Islands, the Canary Islands and the Valencian Community. At least 381 of 1,220 (Note: Accounts for seat allocations due to population changes taking effect in Madrid (+8). These have been manually calculated by applying the electoral rules set out in the law, on the basis of the latest official population figures provided by the Spanish government as of 2026. As such, it should be deemed as a provisional, non-binding estimation. The definitive allocation will be determined by the election decree at the time of the parliament's dissolution.) seats in the regional parliaments will be up for election. The elections will held on 23 May (concurrently with local elections all across the country). Additional elections may be held throughout the year in the event of early dissolutions being triggered in other regions.

== Election date ==
Determination of election day varies depending on the autonomous community. Typically, most autonomous communities hold their elections on the fourth Sunday of May every four years, concurrently with nationwide local elections, while others have their own, separate electoral cycles. In some cases, regional presidents have the prerogative to dissolve parliament and call for extra elections at a different time, but newly elected assemblies are restricted to serving out what remain of their previous four year-terms without altering the period to their next ordinary election. In other cases—Andalusia (since 1994), Aragon (2007), the Balearic Islands (2007), the Basque Country (1981), the Canary Islands (2018), Castile and León (2007), Catalonia (1985), Extremadura (2011), Galicia (1985), Navarre (2010) and the Valencian Community (2006)—the law grants regional presidents the power to call snap elections resulting in fresh four-year parliamentary terms.

== Regional governments ==
The following table lists party control in autonomous communities. Gains for a party are highlighted in that party's colour.

Election day	Region	Previous control	New control
23 May	Asturias	Spanish Socialist Workers' Party (PSOE)	
23 May	Cantabria	People's Party (PP)	
23 May	Castilla–La Mancha	Spanish Socialist Workers' Party (PSOE)	
23 May	La Rioja	People's Party (PP)	
23 May	Madrid	People's Party (PP)	
23 May	Murcia	People's Party (PP)	
23 May	Navarre	Spanish Socialist Workers' Party (PSOE)	
TBD	Balearic Islands	People's Party (PP)	
TBD	Canary Islands	Canarian Coalition (CCa)	
TBD	Valencian Community	People's Party (PP)	

== Summary by region ==
=== May (at least 7 regions) ===
==== Asturias ====
Under national and regional law, an election to the General Junta of the Principality of Asturias must be held on the fourth Sunday of May 2027, which is 23 May.

==== Cantabria ====
Under national and regional law, an election to the Parliament of Cantabria must be held on the fourth Sunday of May 2027, which is 23 May.

==== Castilla–La Mancha ====
Under national and regional law, an election to the Cortes of Castilla–La Mancha must be held on the fourth Sunday of May 2027, which is 23 May.

==== La Rioja ====
Under national and regional law, an election to the Parliament of La Rioja must be held on the fourth Sunday of May 2027, which is 23 May.

==== Madrid ====
Under national and regional law, an election to the Assembly of Madrid must be held on the fourth Sunday of May 2027, which is 23 May.

==== Murcia ====
Under national and regional law, an election to the Regional Assembly of Murcia must be held on the fourth Sunday of May 2027, which is 23 May.

==== Navarre ====
Under national and regional law, an election to the Parliament of Navarre must be held on the fourth Sunday of May 2027, which is 23 May.

=== To be determined (up to regions) ===
==== Balearic Islands ====
Under regional law, an election to the Parliament of the Balearic Islands must be held on or before 27 June 2027.

==== Canary Islands ====
Under regional law, an election to the Parliament of the Canary Islands must be held on or before 27 June 2027.

==== Valencian Community ====
Under regional law, an election to the Corts Valencianes must be held on or before 27 June 2027.

== Bibliography ==
- Ley Orgánica 5/1985, de 19 de junio, del Régimen Electoral General (Organic Law 5/1985). Official State Gazette (in Spanish). 19 June 1985 [version as of 14 July 2025]. BOE-A-1985-11672.
