= 2026 Dominican general election =

- 16 December 2026
Incumbent Prime Minister
Roosevelt Skerrit
DLP

General elections are scheduled to be held in Dominica on 16 December 2026.

== Electoral system ==
The 21 elected members of the House of Assembly are elected in single-member constituencies under first-past-the-post voting. A further nine members are either elected by the Assembly after it convenes or appointed by the President (five on the advice of the prime minister and four on the advice of the Leader of the Opposition) to be Senators; from there the President is chosen by the Assembly and the President appoints a Prime Minister.
