= 2027 North Rhine-Westphalia state election =

State election in Germany

- 25 April 2027

All 181 seats in the Landtag of North Rhine-Westphalia 91 seats needed for a majority
| Party | CDU | SPD | Greens |
| Last election | 76 seats, 35.7% | 56 seats, 26.7% | 39 seats, 18.2% |
| Party | FDP | AfD |
| Last election | 12 seats, 5.9% | 12 seats, 5.4% |
Incumbent Government
Second Wüst cabinet
CDU-Green

The 2027 North Rhine-Westphalia state election will be held on 25 April 2027 to elect the 19th Landtag of North Rhine-Westphalia.

== Opinion polling ==
=== Graphical summary ===
Local regression of polls conducted since the 2022 state election.

=== Party polling ===
| Polling firm | Fieldwork date | Sample size | CDU | SPD | Grüne | FDP | AfD | Linke | BSW | Others | Lead |
|---|---|---|---|---|---|---|---|---|---|---|---|
| Infratest dimap | 9–12 Nov 2026 | 1,173 | 30 | 16 | 17 | 3 | 18 | 7 | 3 | 6 | 12 |
| INSA | 6–13 Oct 2026 | 1,000 | 26 | 18 | 16 | 4 | 21 | 10 | – | 5 | 5 |
| Forsa | 7–18 Sep 2026 | 1,030 | 29 | 14 | 18 | 3 | 22 | 8 | – | 6 | 7 |
| Infratest dimap | 22–25 Jun 2026 | 1,139 | 32 | 17 | 15 | 5 | 17 | 6 | – | 8 | 15 |
| INSA | 30 Apr – 5 May 2026 | 1,000 | 34 | 18 | 15 | 4 | 17 | 9 | – | 3 | 16 |
| Forsa | 7–14 Apr 2026 | 1,531 | 32 | 14 | 17 | 3 | 20 | 6 | – | 8 | 12 |
| Infratest dimap | 26–29 Jan 2026 | 1,164 | 35 | 20 | 13 | 4 | 15 | 6 | – | 7 | 15 |
| INSA | 11–18 Nov 2025 | 1,000 | 36 | 19 | 12 | 5 | 16 | 7 | – | 5 | 17 |
| 2025 local elections | 14 Sep 2025 | – | 33.3 | 22.1 | 13.5 | 3.7 | 14.5 | 5.6 | 1.1 | 7.2 | 11.2 |
| INSA | 13–19 Aug 2025 | 1,000 | 35 | 18 | 13 | 4 | 16 | 8 | 3 | 3 | 17 |
| Forsa | 25 Jun – 2 Jul 2025 | 1,507 | 38 | 17 | 13 | 3 | 16 | 7 | 2 | 4 | 21 |
| Infratest dimap | 23–26 Jun 2025 | 1,165 | 39 | 16 | 15 | 3 | 14 | 7 | 3 | 3 | 23 |
| 2025 federal election | 23 Feb 2025 | – | 30.1 | 20.0 | 12.4 | 4.4 | 16.8 | 8.3 | 4.1 | 3.8 | 10.1 |
| Forsa | 26 Nov – 4 Dec 2024 | 1,508 | 41 | 16 | 14 | 3 | 13 | 2 | 3 | 8 | 25 |
| Infratest dimap | 8–10 Oct 2024 | 1,167 | 40 | 18 | 14 | 3 | 13 | – | 4 | 8 | 22 |
| Forsa | 23 Jul – 1 Aug 2024 | 1,060 | 40 | 16 | 14 | 5 | 12 | 1 | 4 | 8 | 24 |
| 2024 EP election | 9 Jun 2024 | – | 31.2 | 17.2 | 13.5 | 6.3 | 12.6 | 2.1 | 4.4 | 12.7 | 14.0 |
| Infratest dimap | 22–25 Apr 2024 | 1,181 | 38 | 19 | 17 | 5 | 11 | – | 4 | 8 | 19 |
| Forsa | 5–14 Mar 2024 | 1,502 | 37 | 16 | 16 | 4 | 13 | 2 | 4 | 8 | 21 |
| Infratest dimap | 30 Oct–2 Nov 2023 | 1,161 | 35 | 18 | 18 | 5 | 14 | – | – | 10 | 17 |
| Wahlkreisprognose | 27 Aug–2 Sep 2023 | 1,100 | 33.5 | 19.5 | 16.5 | 4.5 | 18 | 2 | – | 6 | 14 |
| Infratest dimap | 12–15 Jun 2023 | 1,159 | 32 | 22 | 16 | 6 | 15 | 3 | – | 6 | 10 |
| Forsa | 29 May–7 Jun 2023 | 1,506 | 37 | 21 | 14 | 5 | 13 | 3 | – | 7 | 16 |
| INSA | 24 Apr–2 May 2023 | 1,000 | 36 | 22 | 17 | 7 | 9 | 3 | – | 6 | 14 |
| Forsa | 27–28 Mar 2023 | 1,005 | 38 | 20 | 17 | 5 | 8 | 4 | – | 8 | 18 |
| Forsa | 23–31 Jan 2023 | 1,006 | 36 | 22 | 18 | 5 | 8 | 3 | – | 8 | 14 |
| Wahlkreisprognose | 7–11 Nov 2022 | 1,400 | 31 | 24.5 | 19 | 5.5 | 12.5 | 1.5 | – | 6 | 7.5 |
| Infratest dimap | 17–20 Oct 2022 | 1,185 | 32 | 23 | 22 | 5 | 9 | – | – | 9 | 9 |
| Forsa | 21–26 Sep 2022 | 1,511 | 36 | 21 | 20 | 5 | 9 | 3 | – | 6 | 15 |
| INSA | 15–22 Aug 2022 | 1,000 | 36 | 22 | 21 | 7 | 5 | 3 | – | 6 | 14 |
| Wahlkreisprognose | 27–30 Jun 2022 | 1,040 | 37 | 27.5 | 15.5 | 6 | 6 | 2 | – | 6 | 9.5 |
| Forsa | 16 May 2022 | 1,008 | 36 | 25 | 21 | 5 | 5 | 2 | – | 6 | 11 |
| 2022 state election | 15 May 2022 | – | 35.7 | 26.7 | 18.2 | 5.9 | 5.4 | 2.1 | – | 5.7 | 9.0 |

=== Minister-President polling ===
| Polling firm | Fieldwork date | Sample size | | | | | | | None/ Unsure | Lead |
| Polling firm | Fieldwork date | Sample size | Wüst CDU | Philipp SPD | Post SPD | Kutschaty SPD | Neubaur Grüne | Vincentz AfD | None/ Unsure | Lead |
|---|---|---|---|---|---|---|---|---|---|---|
| Wahlkreisprognose | 27 Aug – 2 Sep 2023 | 1,100 | 40 | 21 | – | – | 10 | 10 | 19 | 19 |
| Wahlkreisprognose | 27 Aug – 2 Sep 2023 | 1,100 | 40 | – | 18 | – | 13 | 13 | 16 | 22 |
| Wahlkreisprognose | 27 Aug – 2 Sep 2023 | 1,100 | 43 | 29 | – | – | – | – | 28 | 14 |
| Wahlkreisprognose | 27 Aug – 2 Sep 2023 | 1,100 | 46 | – | 26 | – | – | – | 28 | 20 |
| Wahlkreisprognose | 7–11 Nov 2022 | 1,400 | 35 | – | – | 20 | 18 | – | 27 | 15 |
| Forsa | 21–26 Sep 2022 | 1,511 | 31 | – | – | 14 | 10 | – | 45 | 17 |
