= 2027 United Nations Security Council election =

Election to the United Nations Security Council

- 2027

5 of 10 non-permanent seats on the United Nations Security Council
- Outgoing members Democratic Republic of the Congo (Africa) Liberia (Africa) Bahrain (Asia–Pacific)^{a} Colombia (GRULAC) Latvia (EEG) a. Arab state

The 2027 United Nations Security Council election will be held in mid-2027 during the 81st session of the United Nations General Assembly, held at United Nations Headquarters in New York City. The elections are for five non-permanent seats on the UN Security Council for two-year mandates commencing on 1 January 2028. In accordance with the Security Council's rotation rules, whereby the ten non-permanent UNSC seats rotate among the various regional blocs into which UN member states traditionally divide themselves for voting and representation purposes, the five available seats are allocated as follows:

- Two for the African Group
- One for the Asia-Pacific Group
- One for the Latin American and Caribbean Group
- One for the Eastern European Group

The five members will serve on the Security Council for the 2028–29 period.

== Candidates ==
=== African Group ===
- Libya
- Morocco
- Nigeria

=== Asia-Pacific Group ===
- India
- Tajikistan

=== Eastern European Group ===
Candidates for 1 available position are:

- Slovakia

== See also ==
- List of members of the United Nations Security Council
