= 2023 Cuban presidential election =

2023 election of the president of Cuba

- 19 April 2023
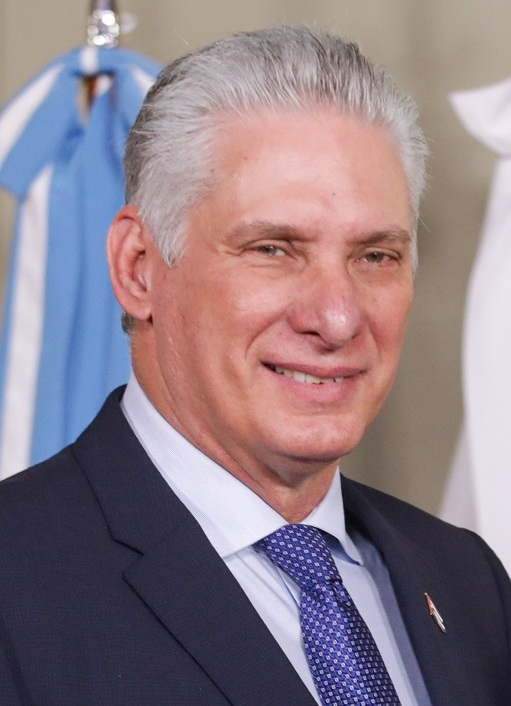
Candidate	Miguel Díaz-Canel
Party	PCC
Electoral vote	459
Percentage	99.78%
President before election
Miguel Díaz-Canel
PCC
Elected
President
Miguel Díaz-Canel
PCC

An indirect presidential election was held in Cuba on 19 April 2023. The election took place following the election to the National Assembly of People's Power on 26 March 2023.

The incumbent president, Miguel Díaz-Canel, was eligible for re-election and his candidacy was supported with 459 votes out of 460 valid votes. Two deputies voted blank.

Likewise, Salvador Valdés Mesa was re-elected to the position of the Vice President with 439 votes.

== Results ==
Candidate	Party	Votes	%
Miguel Díaz-Canel	Communist Party of Cuba	459	99.78
Other candidate	Communist Party of Cuba	1	0.22
Total		460	100.00
Valid votes		460	99.57
Invalid votes		0	0.00
Blank votes		2	0.43
Total votes		462	100.00
Registered voters/turnout		470	98.30
Source: Granma
