= 2027 Republic of the Congo parliamentary election =

- by July 2027
Incumbent President of the National Assembly
Isidore Mvouba
PCT

Parliamentary elections are scheduled to be held in the Republic of the Congo by July 2027.

== Electoral system ==
Members of the National Assembly are elected in single-member constituencies using the two-round system; if no candidate receives a majority of the votes in the first round, a run-off is held.
