= 2027 Burundian presidential election =

- 2027
Incumbent President
Évariste Ndayishimiye
CNDD–FDD

Presidential elections are expected to be held in Burundi in 2027.

== Electoral system ==
The president is elected for a seven-year term using the two-round system. If no candidate receives a majority of the vote in the first round, a second round will be held.
