= Next Bahraini general election =

Incumbent Speaker
Ahmed bin Salman Al-Musallam

General elections were scheduled to be held in Bahrain in November 2026. However, in April 2026 the term of the incumbent Council of Representatives was extended until December 2027.

== Electoral system ==
The 40 members of the Council of Representatives are elected from single-member constituencies using the two-round system; if no candidate receives a majority of the vote in the first round, a second round is held.

Under the 2002 constitution, the council is the lower house of parliament, which examines and passes legislation proposed by the king of Bahrain and the king's appointed cabinet; the upper chamber, the Consultative Council, is appointed by the king and can block legislation passed by the lower house.
