= 2027 Equatorial Guinean parliamentary election =

- by November 2027
- Chamber of Deputies
- All 100 seats in the Chamber of Deputies; 51 seats needed for a majority
Party	Leader	Current seats
PDGE	Teodoro Obiang Nguema	100
CPDS	Andres Esono Ondo	0
- Senate
- 55 of 70 seats in the Senate; 28 seats needed for a majority
Party	Leader	Current seats
PDGE	Teodoro Obiang Nguema	55
CPDS	Andres Esono Ondo	0
Incumbent Prime Minister
Manuel Osa Nsue Nsua; PDGE

Parliamentary elections are scheduled to be held in Equatorial Guinea by November 2027.

== Electoral system ==
The 100 members of the Chamber of Deputies are elected by closed-list proportional representation from multi-member constituencies based on the 19 districts with an electoral threshold of 10%. Of the 70 members of the Senate, 55 are elected from the same 19 electoral districts also by closed-list proportional representation and with an electoral threshold of 10%. An additional 15 members are appointed.
