= 2027 Tunisian parliamentary election =

- by December 2027

All 161 seats in the Assembly of the Representatives of the People 81 seats needed for a majority
Incumbent Prime Minister
Sara Zaafarani
Independent

Parliamentary elections are scheduled to be held in Tunisia by December 2027.

== Electoral system ==
The 161 members of the Assembly of the Representatives of the People are elected in single-member constituencies using the two-round system; if no candidate receives a majority of the votes in the first round, a run-off is held.
