= 2027 Angolan general election =

- by August 2027
- All 220 seats in the National Assembly; 111 seats needed for a majority
Party	Presidential candidate	Current seats
MPLA	João Lourenço	124
UNITA	Adalberto Costa Júnior	90
PRS	Benedito Daniel	2
FNLA	Nimi Ya Simbi	2
PHA	Florbela Malaquias	2
- Presidential election
Incumbent President
João Lourenço
MPLA

General elections are scheduled to be held in Angola by August 2027.

== Electoral system ==
The 220 members of the National Assembly are elected by two methods: 90 are elected in 18 five-seat constituencies, using the d'Hondt method, while the remaining 130 are selected by proportional representation using closed lists, allocated proportionally to the nationwide results. Voters must be at least 18 years old and not have an undischarged bankruptcy, criminal conviction, dual citizenship or have been declared insane. Candidates must be at least 35 years old.

Each party nominates a candidate for President of Angola, who is both head of state and head of government, as the first entry on their list. The president is elected by double simultaneous vote – each vote for a party is automatically a vote for their nominee as president, who must be clearly stated on the ballot paper. The presidential candidate of the party receiving the most votes (first-past-the-post) is elected president, for the same term as the assembly. The president may serve a maximum of two terms in accordance with the 2010 constitution.
