= 2027 Marshallese general election =

- by November 2027

All 33 seats in the Nitijela
Incumbent Speaker
Brenson Wase

General elections are scheduled to be held in the Marshall Islands by November 2027.

== Electoral system ==
The 33 members of the Nitijela are elected in 19 single-member constituencies via first-past-the-post voting and five multi-member constituencies of between two and five seats via plurality block voting. The President is indirectly elected by the Nitijeļā from among its members.
