= 2027 Micronesian general election =

- 2 March 2027
Incumbent President
Wesley Simina

General elections are scheduled to be held in the Federated States of Micronesia on 2 March 2027.

== Electoral system ==
The 14-member Congress has ten members elected every two years by first-past-the-post voting in single-member constituencies and four senators (representing each of the four states: Yap, Chuuk, Pohnpei, and Kosrae) who are elected every four years.
