= 2027 Northwest Territories general election =

Upcoming legislative election in Northwest Territories, Canada

- October 5, 2027

All 22 seats in the Legislative Assembly of the Northwest Territories
Incumbent Premier
R. J. Simpson

The 2027 Northwest Territories general election is scheduled for October 5, 2027. The twenty two members will be elected to the Legislative Assembly of the Northwest Territories, up from nineteen members. The assembly is run on a consensus government system, in which all members of the Legislative Assembly sit as independents and are not organized into political parties.
