= 2027 Omani general election =

- October 2027

General elections are due to be held in Oman by October 2027. As the country is an absolute monarchy, the legislature is a purely advisory body. Political parties are banned, as such all candidates will run as independents.
