= 2027 Kenyan general election =

13th general election in Kenya

- 10 August 2027
- Presidential election
Incumbent President
William Ruto
UDA

The 2027 Kenyan general election is scheduled to be held on 10 August 2027 to elect the President, members of the National Assembly, senators, county governors, women representatives and members of county assemblies. It will be the fourth general election held under the 2010 Constitution of Kenya. Incumbent President William Ruto will seek re-election for a second term.

The election is expected to be shaped by economic concerns, including the cost of living, taxation, unemployment, corruption and police accountability, alongside growing youth activism and political participation. Youth-led mobilisation, particularly following the 2024 protests against the Finance Bill, has brought renewed attention to government accountability and economic policy. Opposition politics remain fragmented, with several potential contenders, including Kalonzo Musyoka, Rigathi Gachagua and Fred Matiang'i, and ongoing efforts to form alliances ahead of the election. The emerging Wantam ("one term") and Tutam ("two terms") slogans reflect competing positions on whether Ruto should serve a second term. Electoral preparations, including voter registration and concerns about the transparency and credibility of the electoral process, are also expected to feature prominently in the run-up to the election.

== Electoral system ==
The president of Kenya is elected using a modified version of the two-round system: to win in the first round, a candidate must receive over 50% of the vote nationally and 25% of the vote in at least 24 of Kenya's 47 counties. If no candidate achieves this, a second round is held between the top two candidates, in which the candidate with the most votes wins.

The National Assembly has 350 members, of which 290 are elected in single-member constituencies by first-past-the-post voting. Of the remaining 60, 47 are reserved for women and are elected from single-member constituencies based on the 47 counties, also using the first-past-the-post system. The remaining 13 seats include 12 nominated by political parties based on their number of seats and a speaker, elected by the assembly from outside of it as an ex officio member. The nominated members are reserved for youths, persons with disabilities and workers.

The 68 members of the Senate are elected by four methods; 47 are elected in single-member constituencies based on the counties by first-past-the-post voting. Parties are then assigned a share of 16 seats for women, two for youth and two for persons with disabilities based on their seat share. A speaker is also elected as an ex officio member.

== Electoral Reforms ==
Several changes have been made in preparations for the 2027 general election including changes to electoral laws, adjustments by the IEBC and court decisions in election conduct. In July 2024, President William Ruto signed the Independent Electoral and Boundaries Commission (Amendment) Act 2024, into law which introduced new rules on the delimitation of constituency and ward boundaries requiring public particiption and consideration of proposed changes by Parliament. The act also required the IEBC to review its operations after every general election and publish its findings within 18 months. It also expanded the professional backgrounds from which IEBC commissioners could be appointed to include information technology and accounting.

The IEBC also prepared an Election Operations Plan covering the 2025–2027 electoral cycle which set out how the commission would prepare for different stages of the election including voter registration, election preparations and logistics, and the conduct of the electoral process. It also covered voter education, election observation, the participation of Kenyans living abroad and the allocation of party-list seats. The commission resumed continuous voter registration in September 2025 and later conducted an enhanced registration exercise between 30 March and 28 April 2026 registering 2,612,725 new voters in both exercises.

In August 2026 the IEBC published the electoral calendar for the general election scheduled for 10 August 2027. Through a Gazette notice it brought the Electoral Code of Conduct and the Election Offences Act into effect for the election period. The commission also set out the timelines for voter registration, political party activities, candidate nominations and election campaigns and as well called on the National Police Service and the Office of the Director of Public Prosecutions to enforce the provisions of the Election Offences Act.

On 22 September 2026, the High Court delivered its judgment in Okoiti & another v Independent Electoral and Boundaries Commission & 5 others in which it upheld the constitutionlity of Section 39 of the Elections Act and Regulation 83(2) of the Elections (General) Regulations. The court ruled that presidential election results declared and certified by constituency returning officers were final and could only be changed through a court order. It also clarified that the responsibility for national tallying and verification rested with the IEBC as a commission, rather than its chairperson acting alone. The court further held that where electronically transmitted results differed from the physical records the accurate polling-station record would take precedence.

In October 2026, the National Assembly considered the Elections (Amendment) (No. 2) Bill 2024 which had earlier been passed by the Senate. One of the proposed changes concerned Section 39 of the Elections Act, which deals with the transmission and declaration of election results. The proposed wording attracted public criticism because it did not expressly retain the requirement for the IEBC to livestream results announced at polling stations. On 22 October, the National Assembly removed Clause 22 from the Bill leaving the existing Section 39 in place including subsection 39(1G) which provides for the livestreaming of results for public information making the House rely on the High Court's September 2026 judgment and the Bill was subsequently referred back to the Senate for consideration under Article 110 of the Constitution.
