= 2027 Tajik presidential election =

- by October 2027
Incumbent President
Emomali Rahmon
PDP

Presidential elections are scheduled to be held in Tajikistan by October 2027.

== Electoral system ==
The President of Tajikistan is elected for a seven-year term using the two-round system; if no candidate receives over 50% of all votes cast, a second round is held between 15 and 31 days later between the two candidates who received the most votes. For the result to be validated, voter turnout must exceed 50%; if it falls below the threshold, fresh elections will be held.

Candidates are required to gather and submit signatures from 5% of registered voters in order to run in the elections.
