= 2027 Kyrgyz presidential election =

- 27 January 2027
Incumbent President
Sadyr Japarov
Mekenchil

Presidential elections are scheduled to be held in Kyrgyzstan on 27 January 2027. Incumbent president Sadyr Japarov has announced that he will seek a second term in office. The election follows a constitutional ruling in February 2026 that determined that Japarov's current six-year mandate, which began in 2021, would count as his first presidential term, allowing him to seek re-election under the 2021 Constitution.

== Background ==
The previous presidential election was held on 10 January 2021, following the resignation of President Sooronbay Jeenbekov in October 2020 amid political unrest and the subsequent political crisis. Sadyr Japarov, who had become acting president and prime minister following the unrest, won the election in the first round with approximately 79 percent of the vote. The election was held concurrently with a referendum on the form of government, in which voters approved a presidential system of government.

In April 2021, voters approved a new constitution, formally replacing the previous parliamentary system with a stronger presidential system and expanding the powers of the presidency. The November 2021 parliamentary election was the first parliamentary election held under the new constitutional framework.

Since Japarov assumed the presidency in 2021, Kyrgyzstan has been described by international human rights and democracy-monitoring organizations as experiencing democratic backsliding, with increasing concentration of political power in the presidency and restrictions on political opposition, civil society and freedom of expression. During Japarov's presidency, authorities also came under increasing criticism over pressure on independent media and journalists, including legal proceedings against journalists and restrictions affecting independent media organizations.

Japarov's presidency was closely associated with Kamchybek Tashiev, whom he appointed chairman of the State Committee for National Security in October 2020. By 2024, analysts and researchers had described Japarov and Tashiev as a political "tandem", with the two men exercising significant influence over the country's political system. Their political partnership ended in February 2026, when Japarov dismissed Tashiev as chairman of the State Committee for National Security and deputy chairman of the Cabinet of Ministers, followed by changes within the security services and the removal or resignation of several officials associated with Tashiev. Analysts subsequently described the rupture as the end of the informal political "tandem" between Japarov and Tashiev and as part of the consolidation of presidential power ahead of the 2027 presidential election.

The 2025 parliamentary election was held after the parliament was dissolved early and under a revised electoral system. Candidates aligned with Japarov and his political allies secured a dominant position in the resulting parliament.

=== Eligibility of Japarov's re-election ===
The eligibility of Japarov to seek a second term became the subject of constitutional debate in early 2026. Japarov had been elected in January 2021 under the 2010 Constitution, which provided for a six-year presidential term. The new constitution adopted in April 2021 introduced five-year presidential terms and limited presidents to two terms, creating questions over how the new provisions applied to Japarov's existing mandate.

On 11 February 2026, Japarov appealed to the Constitutional Court for an official interpretation of the constitutional provisions concerning the duration of his mandate and the timing of the next presidential election. On 17 February, the Constitutional Court ruled that Japarov's current mandate retained its original six-year duration and would end in 2027, preventing an interpretation under which he could potentially remain in office until 2037. It further determined that the mandate would count as his first presidential term under the new Constitution, allowing him to seek a second term in the 2027 presidential election, which, if elected, would extend his presidency until 2032.

Deputy Chairman of the Cabinet of Ministers Edil Baisalov said that Japarov would participate in the next presidential election, while Japarov's spokesman subsequently said that his participation in a second-term election would be consistent with his policies. In October 2025, Japarov said that if he decided to run in the next presidential election, he was confident that he would receive significant public support.

In an interview published on 13 August 2026, Japarov said that he had initially planned to leave office after his first term and support former State Committee for National Security chairman Kamchybek Tashiev as his successor, but later changed his plans after concluding that Tashiev was not ready to become president. In the same interview, Japarov confirmed that he would seek a second term in the 2027 presidential election.

=== Election date ===
The presidential election was initially expected to be held in October 2026 under the electoral timetable in force following the 2021 presidential election. In April 2025, Japarov requested that parliament amend the electoral law to move the election to January 2027, arguing that an October election would interrupt his six-year presidential mandate, which had begun with the early election held in January 2021. The Supreme Council subsequently approved legislation scheduling the election for 24 January 2027.

The timing of the election remained subject to further political debate in early 2026. In February, a group of 75 former officials and prominent public figures called for an early presidential election, prompting speculation over whether the vote could be held before January 2027. The Constitutional Court subsequently affirmed the existing electoral timetable and stated that an early presidential election could only be held under constitutionally specified circumstances.

In June 2026, the parliament approved further amendments changing the election day from the fourth Sunday of January to the fourth Wednesday. Japarov signed the amendments into law in July, establishing 27 January 2027 as the date of the presidential election.

== Electoral system ==
The President of Kyrgyzstan is elected directly by voters using the two-round system, with a second round held between the two candidates who receive the highest numbers of votes if no candidate obtains a majority in the first round. The president serves a five-year term and may be elected for no more than two terms.

Kyrgyz citizens who are at least 18 years old have the right to vote in presidential elections, subject to the restrictions established by law.

A presidential candidate must be a citizen of Kyrgyzstan, at least 35 years old, speak the state language, have resided in Kyrgyzstan for a total of at least 15 years, and not hold citizenship of another country. A candidate must also present a nationwide development programme and collect at least 30,000 signatures from voters in order to be registered.

== Candidates ==
=== Announced ===
- Sadyr Japarov — incumbent president. Japarov announced on 13 August 2026 that he would seek a second term in office.

=== Potential ===
The following figures have publicly discussed the possibility of participating in the election but have not announced their candidacies:

- Iskhak Masaliyev — former member of the Supreme Council and leader of the Communist Party of Kyrgyzstan. Masaliyev said that his participation would be decided collectively by the party.
- Toktayym Umetalíeva — public figure who said that she had not ruled out participating in the election.
- Adakhan Madumarov — former member of the Supreme Council and presidential candidate in the 2021 Kyrgyz presidential election, who has been mentioned as a potential candidate.
- Klara Sooronkulova — former Constitutional Court judge and presidential candidate in 2021, who has not ruled out participating.
- Aimen Kasenov — politician and presidential candidate in 2021, who said that he had not yet made a final decision.

=== Declined ===
- Kamchybek Tashiev — former chairman of the State Committee for National Security. Tashiev said in July 2026 that he would not participate in the election and would support Japarov.
- Akhmatbek Keldibekov — former speaker of the Supreme Council, who said that he did not intend to participate and would support Japarov.
- Omurbek Babanov — former prime minister, who had previously ruled out participation after saying that he had ended his political career.
- Elvira Surabaldieva — member of the Supreme Council who said that she did not plan to participate.
- Temir Sariyev — former prime minister who said that participating in the election was not relevant to him.
- Akylybek Japarov — former chairman of the Cabinet of Ministers, who said that he would remain on Japarov's team and support the younger generation of politicians.

== See also ==
- List of leaders of Kyrgyzstan
- President of Kyrgyzstan
