= 2027 Emirati parliamentary election =

- by October 2027
Incumbent Speaker
Saqr Ghobash

Parliamentary elections are scheduled to be held in the United Arab Emirates by October 2027.

== Electoral system ==
The Federal National Council consists of 40 members, 20 of whom are appointed by the rulers of each emirate. and 20 are elected by single non-transferable vote in seven electoral colleges based on the emirates. The colleges of Abu Dhabi and Dubai elect four members each, the colleges of Sharjah and Ras al-Khaimah three each, and the colleges of Ajman, Fujairah and Umm al-Quwain two each. Since the 2019 election, the FNC has a gender quota, requiring 50% of FNC members to be women.

Not all citizens are eligible to vote. Instead, voters are handpicked and chosen through an electoral college, the membership of which was expanded from 337,738 in 2019 to 398,879 in 2023.
