= 2027 Salvadoran presidential election =

- 28 February 2027
- Opinion polls
- Registered: 6,550,487
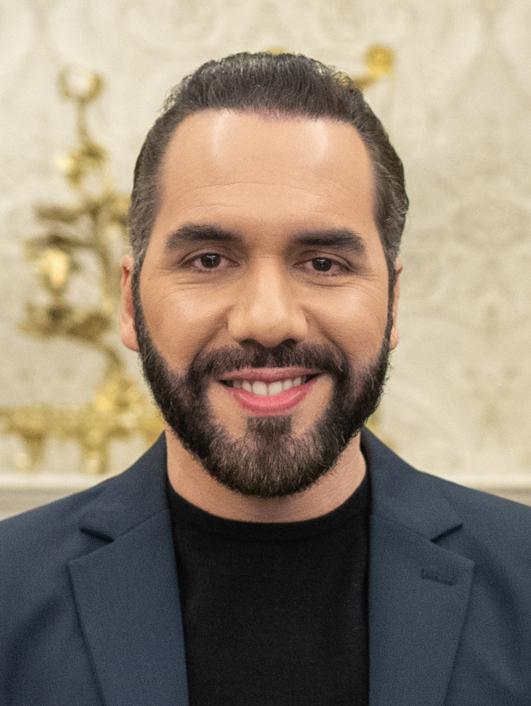

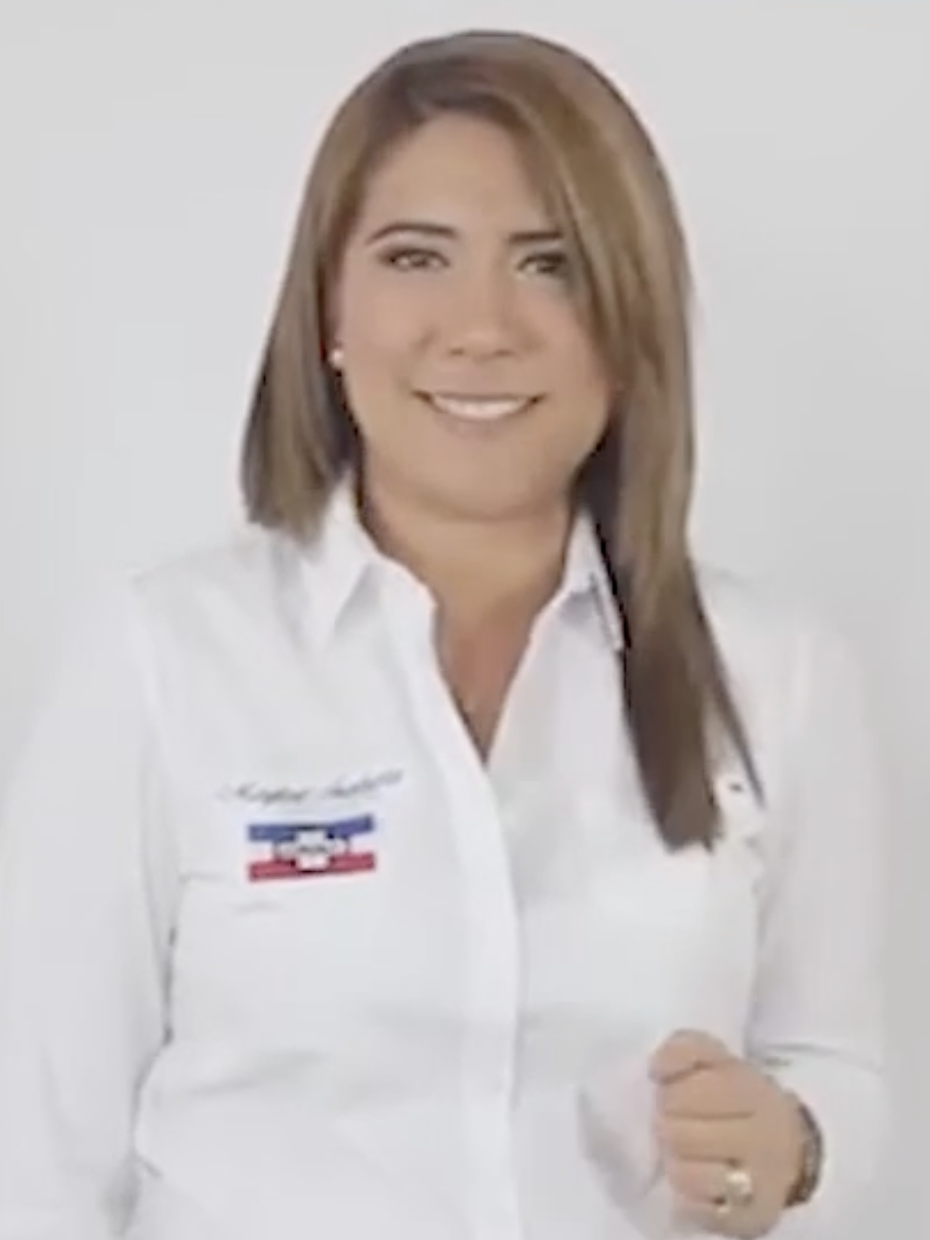

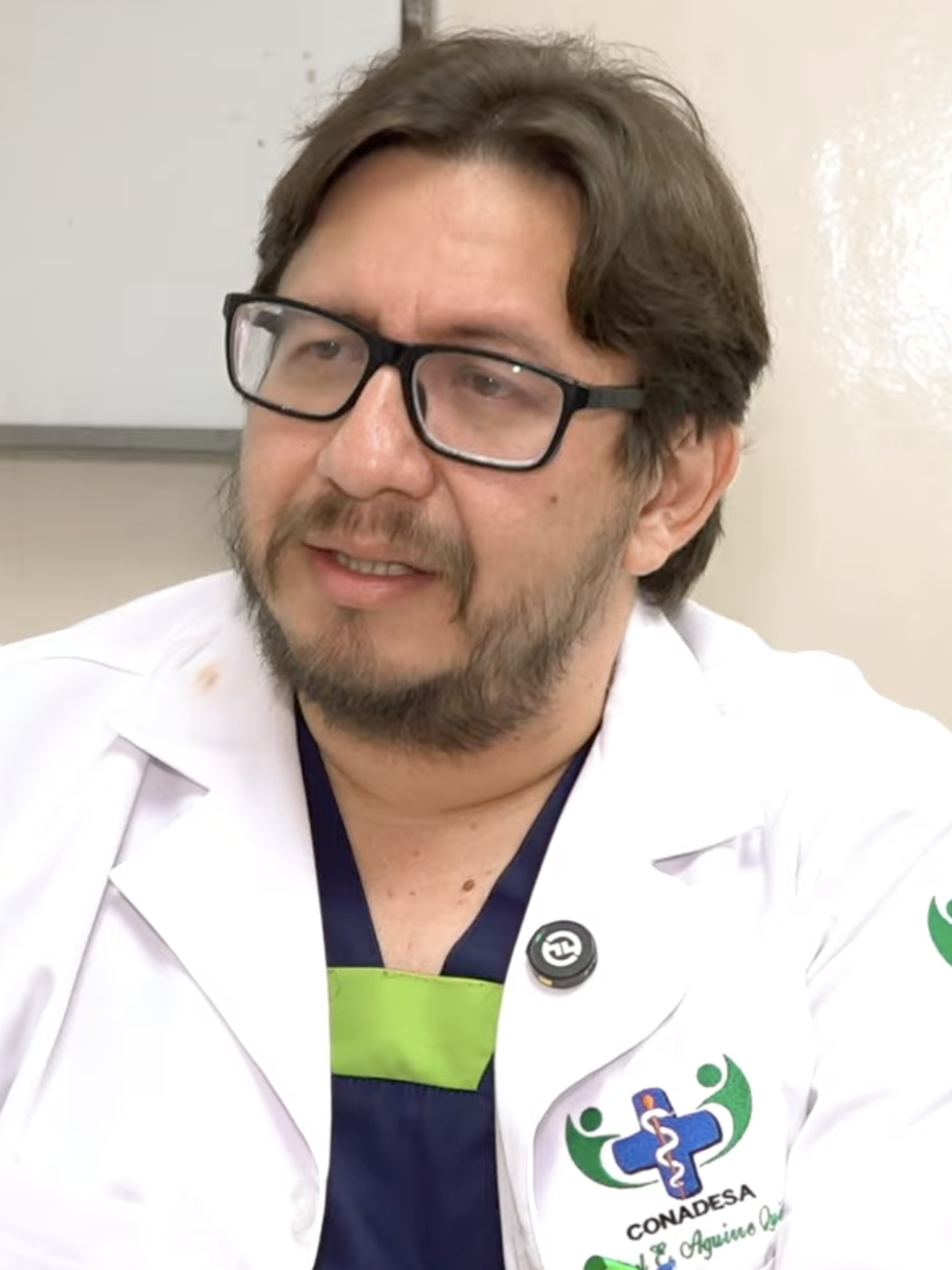

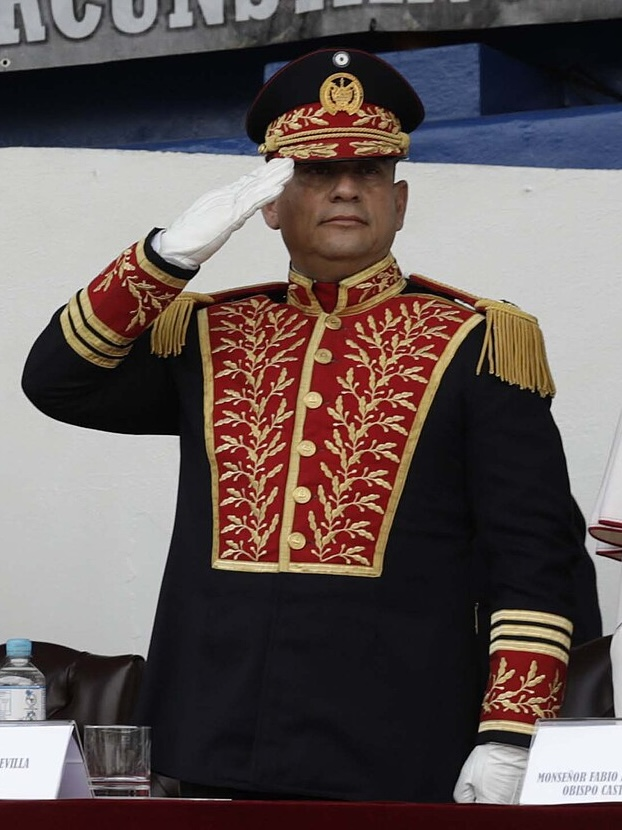
Candidate	Nayib Bukele	Mayteé Iraheta	Rafael Aguirre
Party	NI	ARENA	FMLN
Running mate	Félix Ulloa	Verónica Henríquez	Madaí Santos
Candidate	Alirio García Flamenco	Orlando Delcid
Party	PCN	FPS
Running mate	Mauricio Vilanova	Josué Bryan Muñoz
Incumbent President
Nayib Bukele
Nuevas Ideas

Presidential elections are scheduled to be held in El Salvador on 28 February 2027, three years after the 2024 presidential election. They will occur with concurrent legislative and municipal elections. In July 2025, the Legislative Assembly of El Salvador voted to move the date of the next presidential election from 2029 to 2027. It also approved several constitutional amendments, among them, the abolition of presidential term limits and the increase of presidential term lengths from five to six years.

Eleven political parties are eligible to participate in the election, of which, nine convoked primary elections and four nominated candidates. Incumbent president Nayib Bukele of Nuevas Ideas is running for re-election to a third presidential term. The opposition's presidential candidates are the Nationalist Republican Alliance's Mayteé Iraheta and the Farabundo Martí National Liberation Front's Rafael Aguirre. The National Coalition Party, which is part of a Nuevas Ideas's governing coalition in the Legislative Assembly, nominated retired general Alirio García Flamenco as its presidential candidate. The Salvadoran Patriotic Fraternity nominated expatriate Orlando Delcid. (Note: Also sometimes rendered as "Orlando del Cid".) The remaining parties did not nominate a presidential candidate. Among them, Vamos announced that it will not participate in the election, arguing that it does not seek to legitimize an election that it views as unconstitutional.

== Political background ==
=== Presidency of Nayib Bukele ===
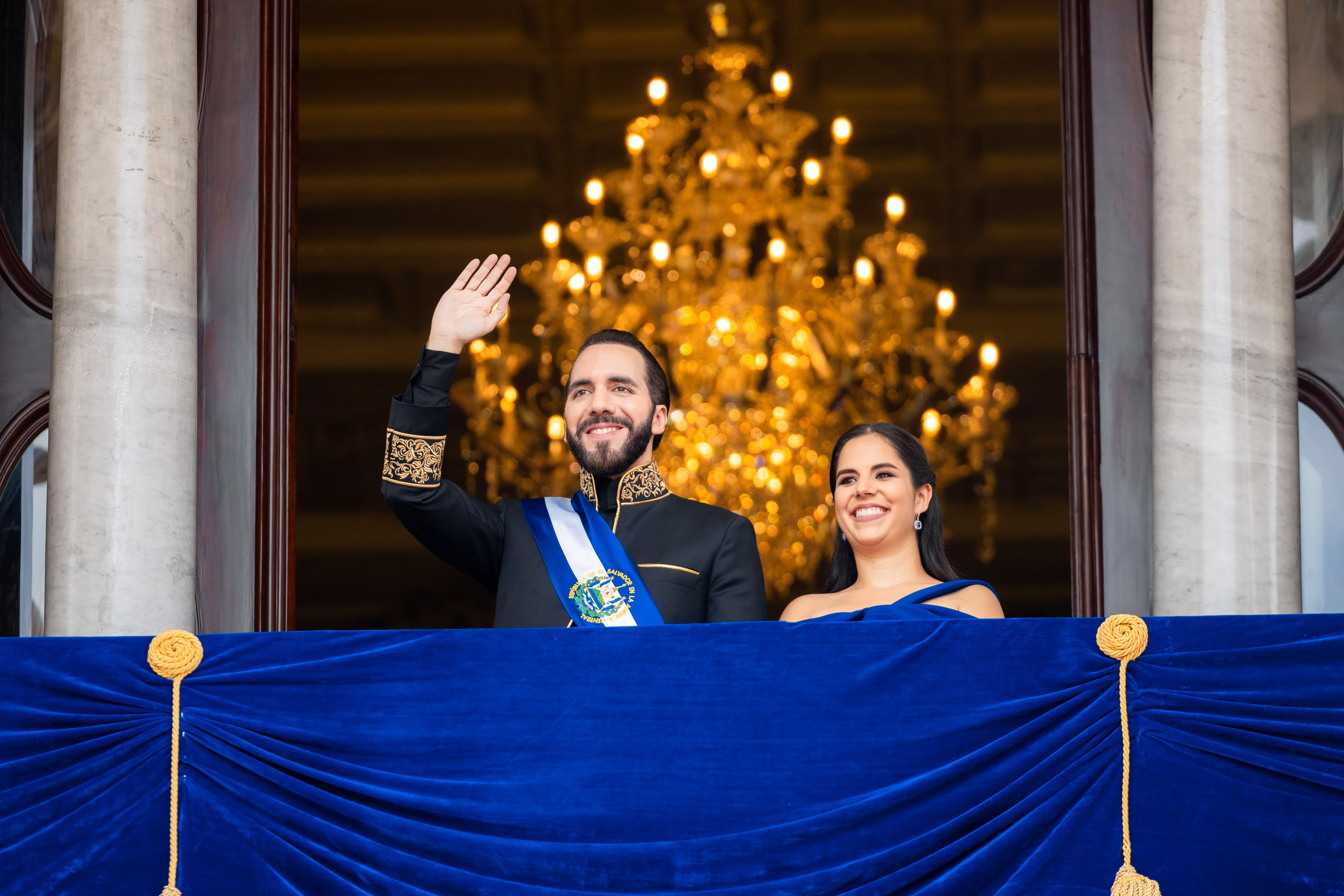
Nayib Bukele with his wife, Gabriela Rodríguez, at his second inauguration

Nayib Bukele became President of El Salvador on 1 June 2019 after winning that year's presidential election. Nuevas Ideas, Bukele's political party, won the 2021 legislative election in a landslide and used its supermajority in the Legislative Assembly to replace the five magistrates of the Supreme Court of Justice's Constitutional Court. In 2022, Bukele initiated a nationwide gang crackdown that as of March 2025, had resulted in over 84,200 arrests and has been accused of human rights violations and secret negotiations with gangs. As a part of the crackdown, he opened the Terrorism Confinement Center (CECOT), a prison with a capacity of 40,000 inmates. Bukele has been described by journalists as an authoritarian and an autocrat, yet also holds approval ratings ranging in the 80s and 90s.

Under Bukele, El Salvador has experienced democratic backsliding. In 2021, the Supreme Court of Justice ruled that the incumbent president was eligible to run for re-election immediately, overturning a 2014 ruling that held that immediate re-election was unconstitutional. The following year, Bukele announced his intention to run for re-election in the 2024 presidential election. Opposition politicians criticized the ruling and Bukele's seeking re-election as unconstitutional. Bukele won re-election with almost 85 percent of the vote in a landslide victory and his second term began on 1 June 2024. Nuevas Ideas won 54 of the Legislative Assembly's 60 seats in concurrent legislative elections.

=== Presidential re-election ===
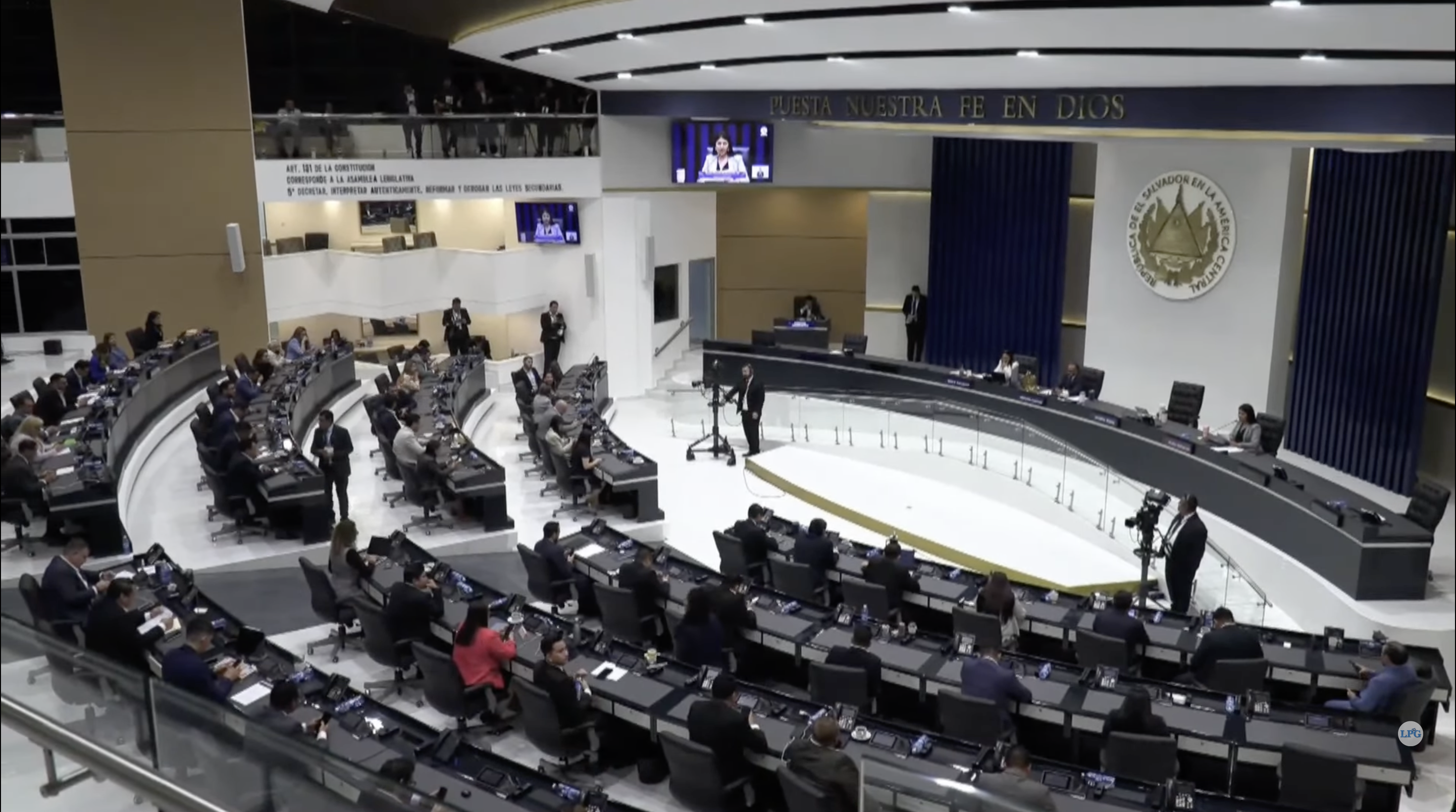
The Legislative Assembly discussing the July 2025 constitutional reforms.

On 31 July 2025, the Legislative Assembly voted to approve several amendments to the constitution of El Salvador. Among them were the abolition of presidential term limits and the increase of presidential term lengths from 5 to 6 years. The Legislative Assembly also voted to abolish the two-round system in favor of first-past-the-post and moved the date of the next presidential election from 2029 to 2027, bringing the presidential election cycle in line with the three-year legislative and municipal election cycle. The latter reform will end Bukele's second term on 1 June 2027, two years ahead of the original date of 1 June 2029. Another amendment enabled the sitting president to seek re-election without needing to take a leave of absence six months before the next presidential term begins. In total, five articles of the constitution were amended or eliminated.

The vote was split along partisan lines: Bukele's 57 allies voted in favor of the constitutional reforms and the 3 members of the opposition voted against them. Ana Figueroa, who proposed the reforms, argued that term limits historically were allowed for most elected offices without restrictions with the only exception being the presidency and that Salvadorans have a right to determine how long elected officials should remain in office. Suecy Callejas, the vice president of the Legislative Assembly, stated that "power has returned to the only place that it truly belongs [...] to the Salvadoran people". Marcela Villatoro, a deputy of the opposition Nationalist Republican Alliance (ARENA), remarked that "today, democracy has died in El Salvador". Claudia Ortiz, a deputy of Vamos, described the reforms as "an abuse of power and a caricature of democracy". Carlos García Saade and Manuel Flores, the leaders of ARENA and the Farabundo Martí National Liberation Front (FMLN), respectively, both criticized the reforms. Meanwhile, Xavier Zablah Bukele, the leader of Nuevas Ideas, supported Bukele remaining in office for a third term. Juanita Goebertus, the director of Human Rights Watch's Americas division, warned that El Salvador "is following the same path as Venezuela" ("está recorriendo el mismo camino que Venezuela"). At the time of the reforms, Nicaragua and Venezuela were the only other Latin American countries to allow indefinite re-election.

Avatar of Nayib Bukele

Nayib Bukele
(@nayibbukele)
tweeted:

English:

90% of developed countries allow the indefinite reelection of their head of government, and no one bats an eye. But when a small, poor country like El Salvador tries to do the same, suddenly it’s the end of democracy. [...]

2 August 2025

On 2 August, Bukele posted on X accusing critics of holding a "double standard" and arguing that indefinite re-election should be allowed in El Salvador as it is allowed for the heads of government of "90% of developed countries". The United States Department of State backed the constitutional reforms, remarking in a statement that "it is up to them to decide how their country should be governed". Ortiz filed a lawsuit with the Supreme Court of Justice on 8 August to declare the constitutional amendments that increased presidential term lengths and abolished term limits to be unconstitutional. Villatoro criticized the lawsuit, arguing that it "would ultimately endorse" ("terminarían de avalar") the reforms as the same Supreme Court justices enabled Bukele's first re-election.

In February 2026, Vice President Félix Ulloa defended indefinite re-election, arguing that it allowed people to "make decisions freely, directly, democratically, and securely" ("toman las decisiones de manera libre, directa, democráticamente, de manera segura"). In November 2026, Ulloa stated that Bukele can seek re-election for as many terms as he wants as long as the people vote for him. According to an opinion poll conducted by the Central American University in May 2026, 65.3 percent of Salvadorans supported moving the presidential election from 2029 to 2027 while 23.9 percent opposed moving the election.

== Electoral system ==
=== Election procedure ===
A presidential election was initially scheduled to be held in 2029, five years after the 2024 presidential election, but the Legislative Assembly voted in 2025 to reschedule the election for 2027. The election is scheduled to occur on 28 February 2027 with concurrent legislative and municipal elections. Salvadorans outside of the country will be able to vote online from 30 January to 28 February. As of 6 June 2026, there are 6,550,487 registered voters, of which, 5,451,501 reside in the country and 1,098,986 live abroad. Salvadorans have until 29 November 2026 to be registered to vote.

Salvadorans will elect a president and a vice president on a joint-ticket. All candidates must be Salvadoran citizens by birth and at least 30 years old. Presidential and vice presidential candidates must be affiliated with political parties registered with the Supreme Electoral Court (TSE) in order to participate in the election. To win, a candidate needs a plurality. FMLN election analysis director Irving Sorto questioned if the election's conduct would be free and fair due to the continued implementation of the state of exception during the gang crackdown. On 2 December 2025, the Legislative Assembly approved a US$172.1 million budget for the 2027 election.

On 15 August, the TSE announced that it will have 92 voting centers outside of El Salvador for expatriates to vote, an increase from 81 in 2024. Of the 92, 53 will be in the United States. Additionally, there will be 4 in Canada and Mexico each, 3 in Italy and Spain each, 2 in Australia, and 1 in 23 other countries each. (Note: The 23 countries that will each have 1 polling station are Argentina, Belize, Belgium, Bolivia, Brazil, Chile, China, Colombia, Costa Rica, the Dominican Republic, Ecuador, France, Germany, Guatemala, Honduras, Japan, Nicaragua, Panama, Peru, Sweden, Switzerland, the United Kingdom, and Uruguay.)

=== Political parties ===
Political parties must be registered with the TSE in order to participate in the 2027 presidential elections. As of February 2026, eleven political parties are eligible to participate in the election. New political parties had until 4 April to petition the TSE for registration and had until 31 August to be fully registered. The following table shows the eleven political parties that are eligible to register candidates with the TSE and whether or not they plan to register presidential and vice presidential candidates.

Party		Leader	Will Participate?
PDC	Christian Democratic Party; Partido Demócrata Cristiano	Reinaldo Carballo	No
FMLN	Farabundo Martí National Liberation Front; Frente Farabundo Martí para la Liberación Nacional	Manuel Flores	Candidate nominated
GANA	Grand Alliance for National Unity; Gran Alianza por la Unidad Nacional	Nelson Guardado	No
V	Let's Go; Vamos	Cesia Rivas	No
PCN	National Coalition Party; Partido de Concertación Nacional	Manuel Rodríguez	Candidate nominated
ARENA	Nationalist Republican Alliance; Alianza Republicana Nacionalista	Carlos García Saade	Candidate nominated
NI	New Ideas; Nuevas Ideas	Xavier Zablah Bukele	Yes
DS	Salvadoran Democracy; Democracia Salvadoreña	Ezequiel Mendoza Fermán	No
PAIS	Salvadoran Independent Party; Partido Independiente Salvadoreño	Roy García	No
FPS	Salvadoran Patriotic Fraternity; Fraternidad Patriota Salvadoreña	Óscar Morales Lemus	Candidate nominated
FS	Solidary Force; Fuerza Solidaria	Rigoberto Soto	No

== Candidates ==
=== Registered candidates ===
Party	Candidate		Running mate		Date nominated	Date registered
Nuevas Ideas Nuevas Ideas	Nayib Bukele	Nayib Bukele; 43rd President of El Salvador (2019–present); Mayor of San Salvador (2015–2018); Mayor of Nuevo Cuscatlán (2012–2015)	Félix Ulloa	Félix Ulloa; 50th Vice President of El Salvador (2019–present)	12 July 2026	20 November 2026

=== Nominated candidates ===
Party	Candidate		Running mate		Date nominated	Date registered
Farabundo Martí National Liberation Front Farabundo Martí National Liberation Front	Rafael Aguirre	Rafael Aguirre	Madaí Santos	Madaí Santos	26 July 2026	TBD
Salvadoran Patriotic Fraternity Salvadoran Patriotic Fraternity		Orlando Delcid		Josué Bryan Muñoz	10 August 2026	TBD
National Coalition Party National Coalition Party	Alirio García Flamenco	Alirio García Flamenco; Chairman of the Joint Chiefs of Staff (2019)	Mauricio Vilanova	Mauricio Vilanova; Mayor of San José Guayabal (2000–2024)	29 July 2026	TBD
Nationalist Republican Alliance Nationalist Republican Alliance	Mayteé Iraheta	Mayteé Iraheta; Deputy of the Legislative Assembly (2015–2021)		Verónica Henríquez	26 July 2026	TBD

=== Declined to be candidates ===
The following individuals have declined to run as a presidential candidate.

- Manuel Flores (Farabundo Martí National Liberation Front): Mayor of Quezaltepeque (2003–2012), Deputy of the Legislative Assembly (2012–2021), Secretary-General of the Farabundo Martí National Liberation Front (2024–present), 2024 FMLN presidential candidate
- Guillermo Gallegos (Grand Alliance for National Unity): Deputy of the Legislative Assembly (2000–2024), President of the Legislative Assembly (2016–2018), Vice President of the Grand Alliance for National Unity (2010–present)
- Claudia Ortiz (Vamos): Deputy of the Legislative Assembly (2021–present)
- Marcela Villatoro (Nationalist Republican Alliance): Deputy of the Legislative Assembly (2018–present)

The following individuals expressed interest in running or a political party considered nominating them as a presidential candidate but ultimately did not run.

- Gerardo Awad (Salvadoran Independent Party): businessman, 2019 ARENA presidential pre-candidate, 2024 PAIS presidential pre-candidate
- Miguel Fortín (proposed by Cambio Total): contributor for La Prensa Gráfica
- Mario Vega (proposed by the Farabundo Martí National Liberation Front): leader of the Elim International Christian Mission
- Idalia Zúniga (proposed by the Farabundo Martí National Liberation Front): teacher

== Election campaign ==
Political parties had until 7 April 2026 to convoke their presidential and vice presidential primary elections and had until 29 July to hold them. The parties will have from 1 October to 19 November to register their presidential and vice presidential candidates with the TSE. Citizen Action, a non-governmental organization, will monitor the primary elections. Days after the deadline to convoke primary elections, Citizen Action reported that no political party published its full list of requirements for candidates to participate in their primaries. The official campaigning period sanctioned by the TSE began on 27 October 2026 and will end on 24 February 2027.

=== Nuevas Ideas ===
In a 2024 interview with Time, Bukele stated that he would not seek a third term in 2029 (before the election date was moved to 2027). Although Bukele declined to run in the next election, The Economist speculated immediately after Bukele's re-election that he could seek to run for a third term as he remarked that the constitution did not "currently" allow for a third presidential term. The July 2025 constitutional reforms made Bukele eligible to run for re-election in 2027. In December 2025, Bukele told Spanish YouTuber TheGrefg in an interview that he would like to govern El Salvador for "ten more years" ("diez años más"). If Bukele wins re-election in 2027 and completes his third term, he would become the longest serving president in Salvadoran history at fourteen years, surpassing Brigadier General Maximiliano Hernández Martínez who served for twelve years between 1931 and 1944.

In February 2026, Ulloa told a Spanish journalist that he was unsure if he would seek re-election to the vice presidency, adding that "I imagine so, otherwise I would be letting the people down" ("me imagino que sí, si no, defraudaría al pueblo"). Nuevas Ideas allowed individuals to register their candidacies beginning on 28 June. That same day, Bukele and Ulloa registered as pre-candidates for the presidency and vice presidency, respectively; on 12 July, the party held its primary election and formally nominated both as its candidates. Bukele presented his candidacy to the TSE on 19 November and the TSE registered his candidacy the following day.

=== Farabundo Martí National Liberation Front ===
On 3 August 2025, Flores, who was the FMLN's 2024 presidential candidate, called on FMLN party members to prepare to campaign for the 2027 election. He stated that he was campaigning to "recover democracy" ("recuperar la democracia"). On 7 December, Flores announced that the FMLN will participate in the 2027 election. He stated that the party is open to forming a coalition to defeat Bukele but ruled out forming a coalition with ARENA, describing such a coalition as "impossible". Flores is leading the FMLN's 2027 electoral campaign, and on 20 July, he announced that he would not run for president in 2027.

In early July, the an anonymous sources from within the FMLN stated that the party was considering three potential presidential candidates: Rafael Aguirre, a physician and the secretary-general of the Union of Salvadoran Social Security Institute Physicians (Simetrisss); Mario Vega, a Pentecostal pastor and leader of the Elim International Christian Mission; and Idalia Zúniga, a teacher and union leader. At the time, Aguirre stated that he was evaluating running for president; on 12 July, he registered with the FMLN as a presidential pre-candidate. Efraín Benítez Andrade, an engineer, registered as one of multiple vice presidential pre-candidates. The FMLN held its primary election on 26 July 2026; the party selected Aguirre as its presidential candidate for Madaí Santos, a former nurse, as its vice presidential candidate.

Supporters of the FMLN gathered in front of the Supreme Electoral Court as Aguirre registers his campaign

Aguirre has stated that his proposals aim to move El Salvador into the future and prevent the country from returning to the past. Aguirre has proposed the creation of a "national plan" to improve healthcare and education. He also proposed creating a "fiscal pact" to acquire improved salaries for health workers. Aguirre announced that his government will focus on agriculture, culture, the economy, education, healthcare, tourism, and the youth. Aguirre has stated that he will not end the state of exception in effect since 2022 that launched the crackdown on gangs, but that he will accept input from experts regarding it. He has also stated that gang members would arrested during the crackdown would remain imprisoned and not be released. Aguirre supports holding a nationwide referendum regarding the legalization of same-sex marriage and abortion. Aguirre referred to his presidential campaign as the "Cabo Verde of the 2027 elections" ("Cabo Verde de las elecciones de 2027"), comparing his campaign to Cabo Verde's underdog performance at the 2026 FIFA World Cup.

Aguirre began campaigning on 7 November and the FMLN presented his candidacy to the TSE on 17 November.

=== Nationalist Republican Alliance ===
On 11 August 2025, Francisco Lira (an ARENA deputy in the Legislative Assembly) called on ARENA to not participate in the presidential election as it would "support unconstitutional re-election" ("avalar la reelección inconstitucional") and called on Salvadorans to spoil their vote, but ARENA's National Executive Council (COENA) stated that the party will participate. Saade confirmed ARENA's participation in September, stating that the party had "cleaned house" ("limpiar la casa"). Joel Sánchez, ARENA's 2024 presidential candidate, remarked on the Las Cosas Como Son show in February 2026 that he believes Bukele will win re-election and described ARENA's leadership as "disappearing".

In May, Villatoro declined to run for president. ARENA held its primary election on 26 July, having postponed them from 19 July. The party nominated Mayteé Iraheta—a deputy of the Legislative Assembly for ARENA from 2015 to 2021—as its presidential candidate and Verónica Henríquez—an agronomist and ARENA's vice president of campaigning—as its vice presidential candidate. The Iraheta–Henríquez ticket is the first time ARENA has ever nominated two women for president and vice president. In August, Saade stated that the party did not disclose the names of their candidates before the primary election to protect them from possible "attacks" from the government. ARENA presented Iraheta's candidacy to the TSE on 18 November.

=== National Coalition Party ===
In March 2026, National Coalition Party (PCN) leader Manuel Rodríguez stated that the PCN was evaluating whether or not it would participate in the 2027 presidential election. On 29 July, Salvadoran newspapers reported that the PCN held its primary election and nominated retired divisional general Alirio García Flamenco for president and Mauricio Vilanova, a former mayor of San José Guayabal, for vice president. According to the PCN, however, it had not yet have a formalized presidential candidate and that the primary process would be complete by 5 August.

On 19 November, García Flamenco presented his candidacy to the TSE. He criticized indefinite re-election, stating that the presidency should alternate between officeholders. He also stated that he will evaluate whether or not to maintain the state of exception.

=== Salvadoran Patriotic Fraternity ===
The Salvadoran Patriotic Fraternity (FPS) held its primary election from 19 to 26 July 2026. On 10 August, the FPS announced that it had nominated Orlando Delcid, an expatriate living in the United States as its presidential candidate. Josué Bryan Muñoz, a musician, is his running mate. In an interview with Imagen Poblana, Delcid stated that as president, he would strengthen El Salvador–Mexico relations with increased economic, security, and technology cooperation. Delcid promised also to build 60 mobile hospitals and implement free school transportation for students. He has outlined a plan to invest $100 million to generate 700,000 jobs. The FPS presented Delcid's candidacy to the TSE on 19 November.

=== Other parties ===
In August 2025, Ortiz told Telenoticias Megavisión that Vamos was evaluating whether or not to participate in the 2027 presidential election as "[the government] just changed the rules" ("acaban de cambiar las reglas"). She evaluated running for president under Vamos throughout 2026 but ultimately decided to run for another term in the Legislative Assembly, ending her potential presidential candidacy. In August 2026, Ortiz told the digital newspaper El Faro that she still wanted to run for President of El Salvador but in a future election.

In August 2025, Guillermo Gallegos, the vice president of the Grand Alliance for National Unity (GANA), announced in an interview that GANA would run a presidential candidate in 2027 to "legitimiz[e] the electoral process" ("legitimando el proceso electoral") in support of Bukele. In a later interview, Gallegos stated that another goal in running a candidate was to prevent ARENA and the FMLN from nominating a magistrate to the TSE. (Note: The TSE consists of five magistrates. Before April 2026, two of the magistrates were appointed by the Supreme Court of Justice; the other three were appointed by the three political parties that finished in first, second, and third place in a presidential election. In April 2026, the Legislative Assembly approved a constitutional reform that eliminated the mechanism where political parties nominate TSE magistrates and replaced it with a "general and public process" ("proceso general y público").) Gallegos stated that he would not run for president, and GANA ultimately did not nominate a presidential candidate. Gallegos stated that the party supported Bukele's candidacy.

On 6 March 2026, the Christian Democratic Party (PDC) announced it would not present a presidential candidate. The PDC considered Bukele's high popularity was an indicator that it was not the correct time for the party to launch a presidential campaign. A PDC representative stated that party members were free to vote for whichever presidential candidate they choose. Solidary Force (FS) scheduled its presidential primary election for 29 July 2026, but party leader Rigoberto Soto confirmed on the day of the primary that FS would not nominate a presidential candidate. The Salvadoran Independent Party (PAIS) did not convoke its primary elections and did not participate in the presidential election.

In July 2025, Ronal Umaña, the leader of the unregistered political party Cambio Total, called for ARENA and the FMLN to unite under Cambio Total's banner during the 2029 presidential election (before the date was changed to 2027). The following month, he proposed nominating La Prensa Gráfica contributor José Miguel Fortín Magaña as a presidential candidate and economist Evelyn Martínez as a vice presidential candidate.

== Question of election legitimacy ==
In March 2026, Vamos leader Cesia Rivas announced that Vamos would not participate in the presidential election, stating that "we cannot legitimize an election that is clearly unconstitutional" ("no podíamos legitimar una elección que claramente es inconstitucional"). She added that the party would solely focus on the legislative and municipal elections. In May, Rivas reiterated that the party would not participate in the election when Ortiz (a Vamos member) stated that she was still evaluating whether or not to run for president. Rivas added that Ortiz's comments of running for president should be considered to be a joke.

In August 2026, Saade stated that ARENA not nominating a presidential candidate would have been "a great error" ("un gran error") and denied criticism that participating in the election would legitimize Bukele's seeking a third term. He also denied online rumors that the government had supposedly threatened ARENA to nominate a candidate to legitimize the election. That same month, Aguirre stated that he does not view the moving of the election date from 2029 to 2027 as unconstitutional, further asking that "if we don't [run] now, when will we?" ("si no lo hacemos en este momento, ¿en qué momento será?"). Aguirre also believed that him running did not legitimize Bukele seeking re-election, and that he viewed re-election as constitutional due to the July 2025 reforms. Flores concurred that he viewed the election as constitutional, arguing that the Legislative Assembly had the ability to move the election date.

"We consider that we will not participate [in the election] nor will we support any candidacy because it ends up legitimizing a process that is entirely controlled by the government; it legitimizes an unconstitutional re-election." (Note: Spanish: Consideramos que no vamos a participar ni vamos a respaldar ninguna candidatura porque termina legitimando un proceso que está totalmente controlado por el gobierno, legitima una reelección inconstitucional.)

— People's Resistance and Rebellion Bloc, 21 August 2026

Umaña called on both ARENA and the FMLN to withdraw their candidates and accused both parties of "selling out" ("vendieron") to legitimize Bukele's candidacy. Luis Parada, a lawyer who finished in fourth place in the 2024 presidential election, told El Faro that no "real" opposition political party should participate in the 2027 presidential election. He asserted that Bukele supposedly needs opposing candidates to "give a semblance of democracy and elections" ("dar una semblanza de democracia y de elecciones") and that parties that ran candidates supposedly support Bukele. On 21 August, the left-wing People's Resistance and Rebellion Bloc (BRP) political movement announced that it would not endorse Aguirre during the 2027 election. The BRP argues that participating in the election legitimizes presidential re-election, which it considers to be unconstitutional.

In 2025, Gallegos stated that GANA planned to nominate a presidential candidate to legitimize the presidential election. According to him, there were people who "would like to delegitimize the election" ("quisieran deslegitimar la elección") and that there were supposedly people "trying to obstruct the election" ("tratan de entorpecer la elección"). He remarked that if GANA nominated a candidate, he would consider it as supporting Bukele by "legitimizing the electoral process" ("legitimando el proceso electoral"). He further added that Salvadorans would legitimize the election by casting their votes. Ultimately, GANA did not nominate a candidate.

== Results ==
The 2027 presidential election is scheduled to occur on 28 February.

Candidate	Running mate	Party	Votes	%
Nayib Bukele	Félix Ulloa	Nuevas Ideas		
Mayteé Iraheta	Verónica Henríquez	Nationalist Republican Alliance		
Rafael Aguirre	Madaí Santos	Farabundo Martí National Liberation Front		
Alirio García Flamenco	Mauricio Vilanova	National Coalition Party		
Orlando Delcid	Josué Bryan Muñoz	Salvadoran Patriotic Fraternity		
Total				
Registered voters/turnout			6,550,487	–

== See also ==
- Elections in El Salvador
- List of elections in 2027
  - 2027 national electoral calendar
