= Mayteé Iraheta =

Salvadoran politician

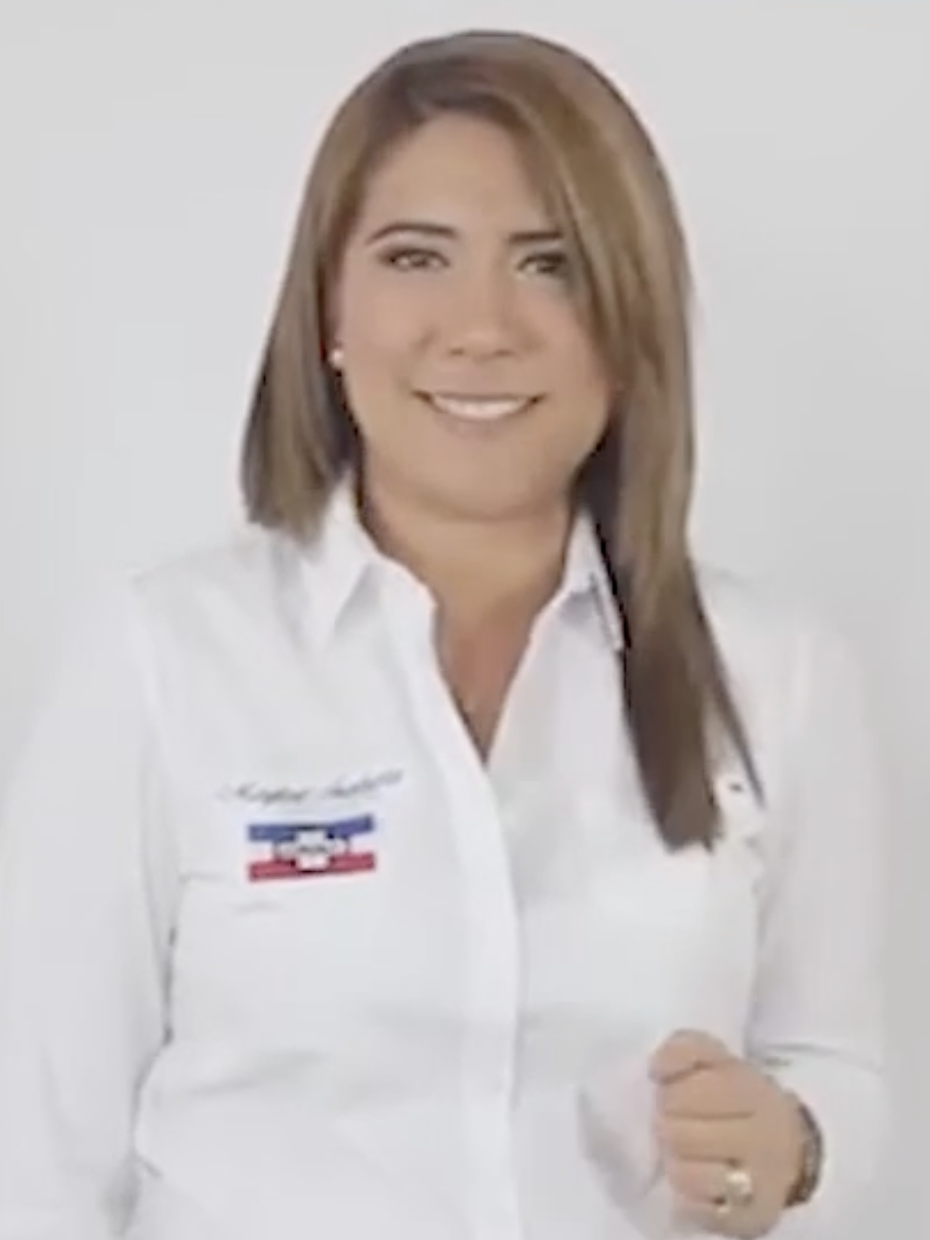
- Iraheta in 2018

Deputy of the Legislative Assembly of El Salvador from Sonsonate
- In office 1 May 2015 – 1 May 2021

Personal details
- Born: Mayteé Gabriela Iraheta Escalante; 13 July 1988 (age 38) Sonsonate, El Salvador
- Party: Nationalist Republican Alliance
- Education: José Matías Delgado University
- Occupation: Politician, lawyer

Mayteé Gabriela Iraheta Escalante (born 13 July 1988) is a Salvadoran politician and lawyer who served as a deputy of the Legislative Assembly of El Salvador from the Sonsonate Department from 2015 to 2021. She is a member of the Nationalist Republican Alliance (ARENA). Iraheta is ARENA's presidential candidate in the 2027 presidential election.

== Early life ==
Mayteé Gabriela Iraheta Escalante was born on 13 July 1988 in Sonsonate, El Salvador. Iraheta attended the José Matías Delgado University from 2005 to 2011 and graduated as a Bachelor of Laws. From 2006 to 2015, Iraheta participated in various seminars covering topics such as women in leadership positions, communications, finance, and tourism, among others.

From 2008 to 2014, Iraheta was a presenter for the "Buenos Días Familia" (Good Morning Family) television show on Channel 8. At some point, she also hosted the "Mujer de Hoy" (Women of Today) podcast. From 2010 to 2011, Iraheta led public relations for the Ecuadorian embassy in El Salvador. From 2012 to 2014, she taught the Complementary Training Course in Social Behavior (Etiquette and Civility) at the José Matías Delgado University. In June 2013, the Helen Keller Foundation of El Salvador recognized Iraheta for "outstanding work and exemplary overcoming adversity" ("destacada labor y ejemplo de superación"). In January 2016, Iraheta received a certificate of citation from Philip Ramos, a member of the New York State Assembly, for inspiring young people to seek a better future.

== Political career ==
In 2015, Iraheta was elected as a deputy of the Legislative Assembly of El Salvador from the Sonsonate Department as a member of the Nationalist Republican Alliance (ARENA). She became the legislator's youngest female member at the age of 26. She was re-elected in 2018. Iraheta was the secretary of the legislature's Committee on Family, Children and Adolescents, Senior Citizens, and Persons with Disabilities; she was also a member of the Committee on Environment and Climate Change and the Committee on Economy. Iraheta was a member of the United Nations Development Programme-organized Parliamentarians Forum on Tobacco Control in 2019. That same year, she participated in the Environmental Forum during British Week 2019. She ran for re-election in 2021 but lost her seat during a Nuevas Ideas landslide in which ARENA only won 1 seat in Sonsonate.

On 26 July 2026, Iraheta was nominated as ARENA's presidential candidate for the 2027 presidential election. Verónica Henríquez, an agronomist, is her running-mate.

== Electoral history ==
Year	Office	Type	Party	Main opponent	Party	Votes for Iraheta				Result	Swing
Year	Office	Type	Party	Main opponent	Party	Total	%	P.	±%	Result	Swing
2015	Deputy of the Legislative Assembly	General	ARENA	N/A				?	N/A	Won	N/A
2018	Deputy of the Legislative Assembly	General	ARENA	N/A				?	N/A	Won	N/A
2021	Deputy of the Legislative Assembly	General	ARENA	N/A				?	N/A	Lost	N/A
2027	President of El Salvador	General	ARENA	Nayib Bukele	NI	To be determined			N/A	TBD	
