= Alirio García Flamenco =

Salvadoran military officer

Divisional General Alirio García Flamenco
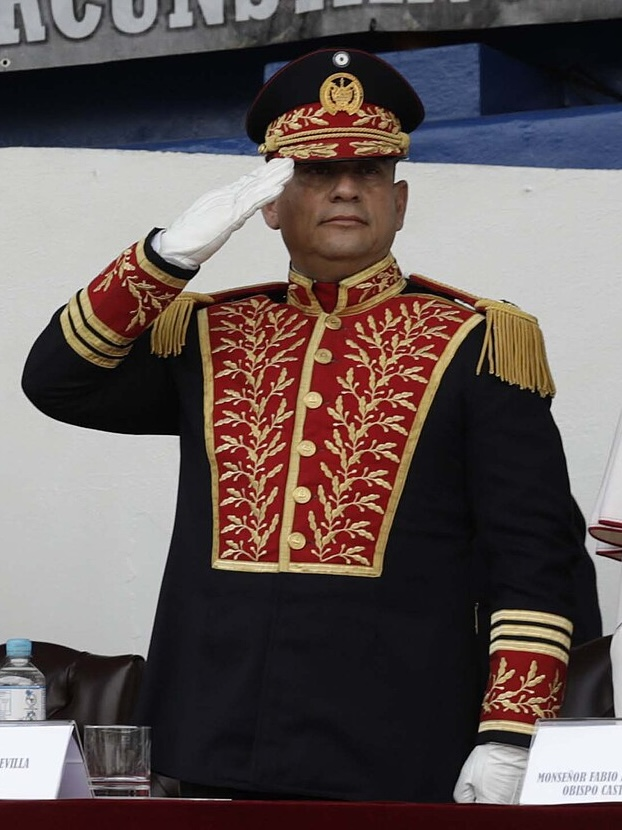
- García Flamenco in 2019
- Born: Alirio García Flamenco Sevilla; 1964 or 1965 (age 60–61)
- Education: Captain General Gerardo Barrios Military School
- Military career
- Allegiance: El Salvador
- Branch: Salvadoran Army
- Service years: 1984–2019
- Rank: Divisional general
- Units: MINURSO; Cuscatlán Battalion
- Commands: 4th Infantry Brigade; Armed Forces of El Salvador
- Conflicts: Salvadoran Civil War; Western Sahara conflict; Iraq War

Alirio García Flamenco Sevilla (born 1964 or 1965) is a Salvadoran former military officer. García Flamenco served as an artillery commander during the Salvadoran Civil War. In 1997, he was a United Nations Military Observer in Western Sahara, and in 2003, he was deployed with the Cuscatlán Battalion to Iraq. He served as chairman of the Joint Chiefs of Staff of the Armed Forces of El Salvador (FAES) in 2019 before being removed by President Nayib Bukele.

== Military career ==
García Flamenco entered the Captain General Gerardo Barrios Military School on 1 January 1984 and was commissioned as a sub-lieutenant on 18 December 1987. With the Salvadoran Army, he served as section commander in the Artillery Brigade in the cities of Chalatenango and Guazapa during the Salvadoran Civil War (1979–1992). During the 1990s, García Flamenco studied in Venezuela under Lieutenant Colonel Hugo Chávez. García Flamenco served as a United Nations Military Observer with MINURSO in Western Sahara, spending six months in the desert and six months in Laayoune, the largest city in Western Sahara. In the early 2000s, García Flamenco studied for a master's degree in procurement and contracting in the United States.

During the Iraq War, García Flamenco was attached to the Cuscatlán Battalion. With the unit, he oversaw the unit's supplies, equipment maintenance, casualty evacuation, and vehicle recovery. According to García Flamenco, his tenure in the Sahara with temperatures as high as 73 °C (163 °F) prepared him for his deployment to Iraq, remarking that he found the Iraqi climate to be easier to adapt to. He also remarked that he served in Iraq because President Antonio Saca, the Legislative Assembly, and the Salvadoran people all wanted military involvement in Iraq.

In January 2014, García Flamenco became the director of communications of the Armed Forces of El Salvador (FAES). In July, García Flamenco was appointed as the commander the 4th Infantry Brigade garrisoned in the Chalatenango Department. On 30 December, he was promoted to brigadier general. On 1 May 2019, the Ministry of National Defense announced that García Flamenco would be promoted to divisional general and that he would assume the role of chairman of the Joint Chiefs of Staff of FAES.

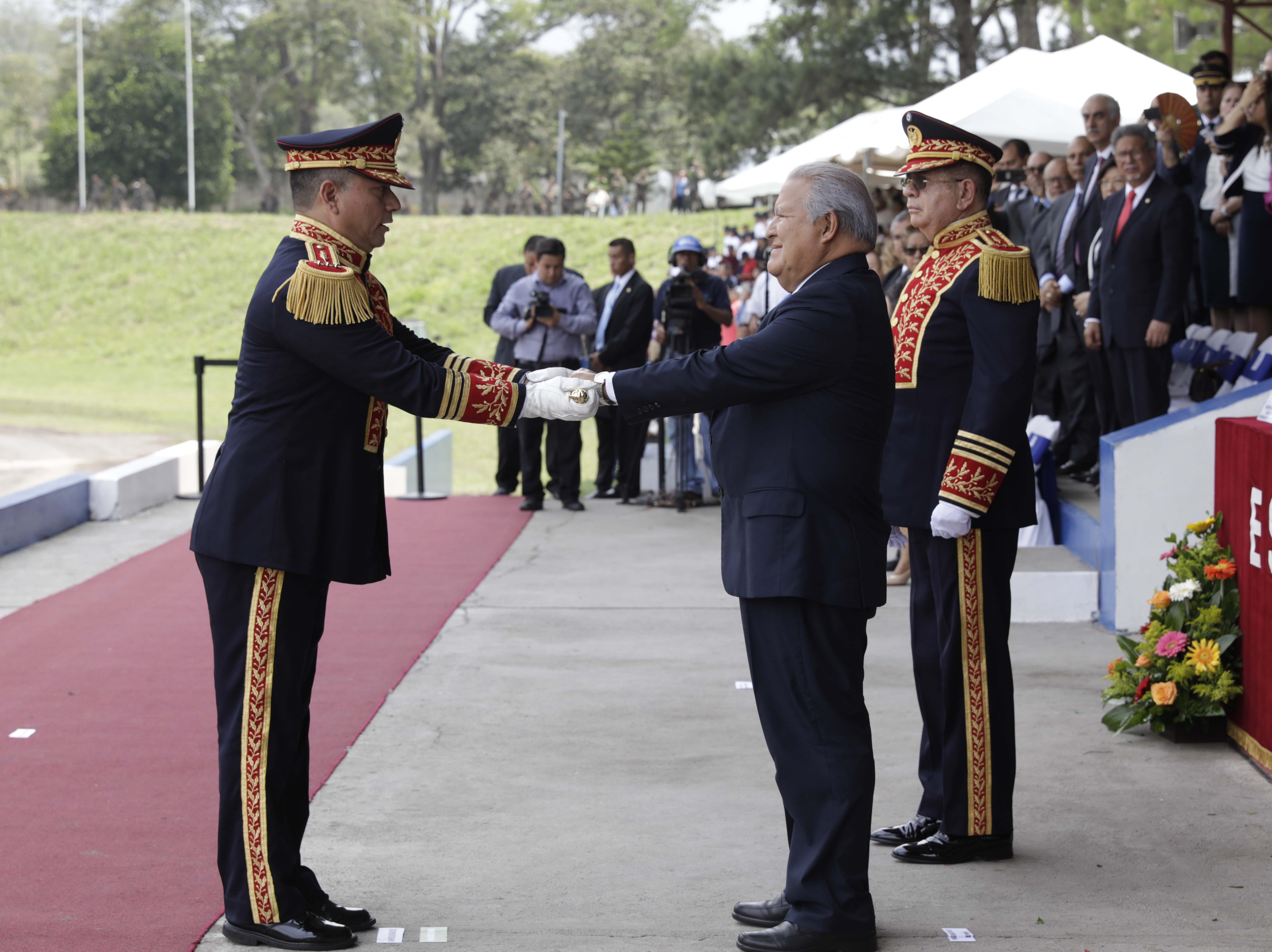
García Flamenco (left) with President Salvador Sánchez Cerén in 2019

In January 2019, García Flamenco became a member of the military's Selection Board that oversaw the promotion of military officers. One of his first decisions was to vote against Navy Captain René Merino Monroy's promotion to rear admiral as Merino Monroy exceeded the Military Career Law's age limit for promotion (55 years). On 7 June, García Flamenco was removed from his post as chairman of the Joint Chiefs of Staff by newly inaugurated president Nayib Bukele and placed on the military reserve list. On 10 October, vice defense minister Colonel Ennio Elvidio Rivera Aguilar dismissed García Flamenco from the Selection Board on the basis that García Flamenco was "impartial" due to dissatisfactions with the armed forces' high command. García Flamenco was replaced by Rear Admiral Juan Antonio Calderón González. In 2020, Merino Monroy (by then Bukele's defense minister) was promoted to rear admiral.

== Political career ==
On 29 July 2026, the National Coalition Party (PCN) nominated García Flamenco as its presidential candidate in the 2027 presidential election. Mauricio Vilanova, a former mayor of San José Guayabal, is his running mate.

== Personal life ==
García Flamenco has a wife and son.

== Electoral history ==
Year	Office	Type	Party	Main opponent	Party	Votes for García Flamenco				Result	Swing	Ref.
Year	Office	Type	Party	Main opponent	Party	Total	%	P.	±%	Result	Swing	Ref.
2027	President of El Salvador	General	PCN	Nayib Bukele	NI	To be determined			N/A	TBD		
