= Arrupe College, El Salvador =

Location
- Soyapango, San Salvador; El Salvador
- Coordinates: 13°43′7″N 89°9′28″W

Information
- Type: Private primary and secondary school
- Religious affiliation: Catholicism
- Denomination: family Salazar-Simpson
- Established: 1997; 29 years ago
- Director: Santiago Nogales
- Grades: Pre-K to Baccalaureate
- Gender: Coeducational
- Enrollment: 1,500
- Website: www.colegiopadrearrupe.org

Arrupe College, El Salvador, is a private Catholic primary and secondary school located in Soyapango, a high-density, low-income area in San Salvador, the capital city of El Salvador. The school was founded by a Father Juan Ricardo Salazar-Simpson in 1997 and it was built and remains largely supported by charitable contributions. The school includes infant through baccalaureate and vocational, and has ranked at the top on national exams.

== History ==
The school is situated in Soyapango. In 1997 Father Juan Ricardo Salazar-Simpson founded the school on his own initiative. He hoped that the Jesuits would take over the school, but he died two years after its founding and José Panadés, a businessman and friend, took over for him. The school was adopted by the Salazar-Simpson family who sponsored the "Padre Arrupe Foundation".

In 1998 the Spanish baccalaureate was introduced. In 2001 the middle school (ages 10–12) was added to compensate for the students' educational deficiency. The school has since expanded to all educational levels including two technical cycles similar to the Spanish FP, and enrolls more than 1500 children between the ages of 3 and 18 years.

In 2015, Padre Arrupe Spanish School was placed first nationally in the government's Learning and Skills Test for Graduates of Middle Education (PAES) 2015.

== See also ==
- Education in El Salvador
