= Rafael Aguirre (physician) =

Salvadoran physician and politician

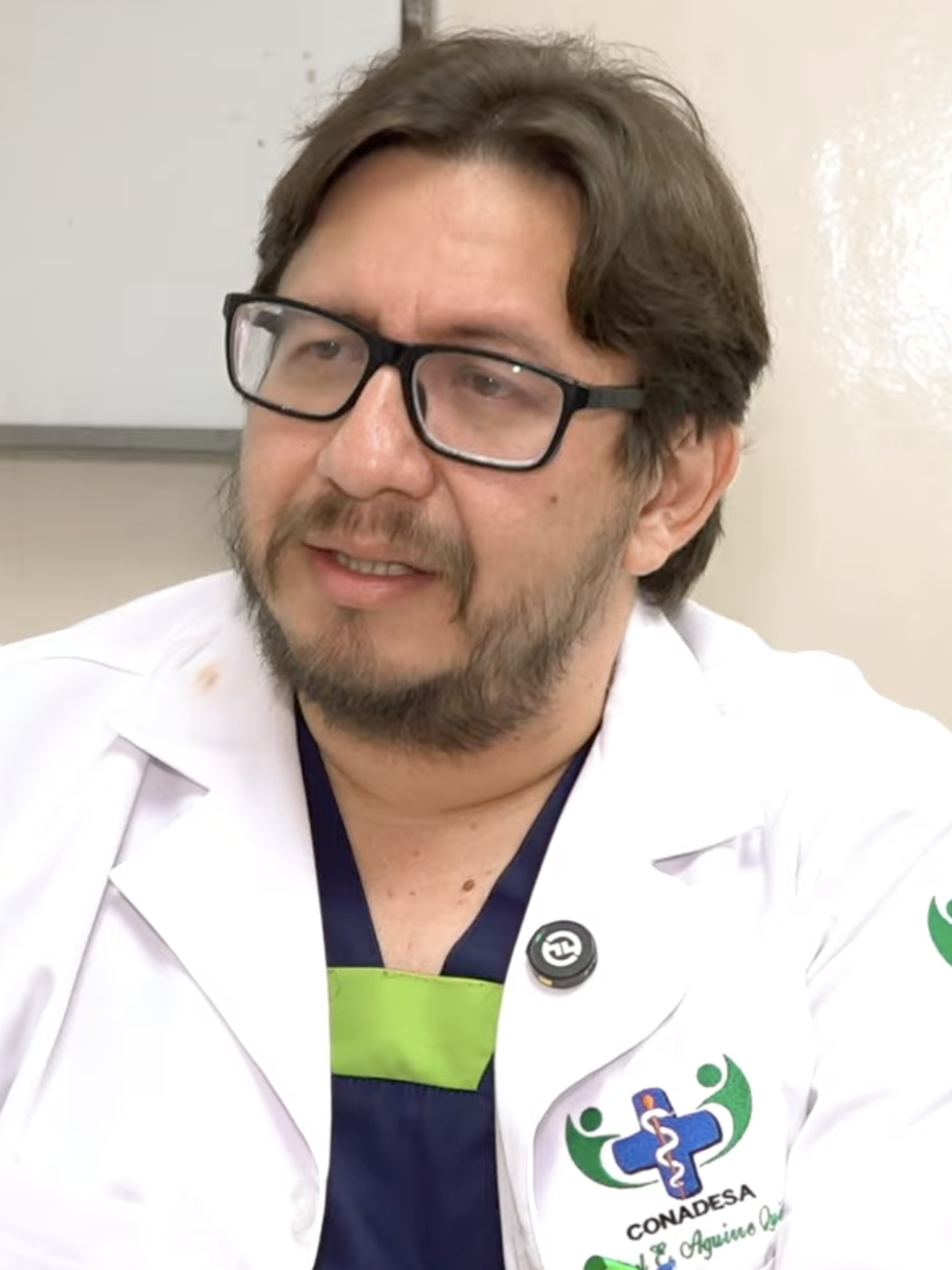
- Aguirre in 2026
- Born: Rafael Ernesto Aguirre Quintanilla
- Occupations: Physician, politician
- Organization: Union of Salvadoran Social Security Institute Physicians
- Political party: Farabundo Martí National Liberation Front

Rafael Ernesto Aguirre Quintanilla is a Salvadoran physician and politician. He is the Farabundo Martí National Liberation Front's (FMLN) presidential candidate in the 2027 Salvadoran presidential election. He also served as the general secretary of the Union of Salvadoran Social Security Institute Physicians (Simetrisss) from 2020 to 2026.

== Biography ==
Aguirre treated COVID-19 patients during the COVID-19 pandemic in El Salvador in 2020. In October 2020, Aguirre became the general secretary of the Union of Salvadoran Social Security Institute Physicians (Simetrisss). Aguirre sought improved working conditions and better salaries for union members, as well as improvements in El Salvador's healthcare system. In May 2026, proceedings began to remove Aguirre as general secretary of Simetrisss. He claimed that he was being removed for complaining about a lack of medications at the Social Security Institute. In July 2026, before Aguirre ran for president of El Salvador in 2027, he sought permission from Simetrisss to no longer serve as its general secretary to keep the organization politically neutral.

=== 2027 presidential campaign ===
In July 2026, the Farabundo Martí National Liberation Front (FMLN) considered Aguirre as a potential presidential candidate ahead of the 2027 Salvadoran presidential election. Aguirre registered as a presidential pre-candidate on 12 July and won the party's primary election on 26 July, selecting former nurse Madaí Santos as his running mate. According to Aguirre, political parties such as the FMLN, the Nationalist Republican Alliance, and Vamos had approached him as a potential presidential candidate as early as November 2025. He stated that he decided to run for president as he believed that complaints, proposals, and protests from Simetrisss were not enough to influence national politics.

After gaining the FMLN's nominate, Aguirre stated that his government will focus on agriculture, culture, the economy, education, healthcare, tourism, and the youth. Among his campaign proposals are improving salaries for healthcare workers; and holding a nationwide referendum regarding the legalization of same-sex marriage and abortion.

== Electoral history ==
| Year | Office | Type | Party | Main opponent | Party | Votes for Aguirre | | | | Result | Swing |
| Year | Office | Type | Party | Main opponent | Party | Total | % | P. | ±% | Result | Swing |
|---|---|---|---|---|---|---|---|---|---|---|---|
| 2027 | President of El Salvador | General | FMLN | Nayib Bukele | NI | To be determined | | | N/A | TBD | |

== Publications ==
- Aguirre, Rafael (17 October 2011). Aplicación de Escala Unal en Pacientes con Hemorragia Digestiva Activa que Ameritaron Endoscopia Temprana en el Hospital General y hmq del ISSS [Application of the Unal Scale in Patients with Active Digestive Bleeding who Required Early Endoscopy at the General Hospital and hmq of the ISSS.] (in Spanish). San Salvador, El Salvador: University of El Salvador. hdl:20.500.14492/19609.

Party political offices
| Preceded by Manuel Flores (2024) | FMLN nominee for President of El Salvador; 2027 | Current nominee |
