= Cambio Total =

Salvadoran political party

Total Change Cambio Total
- Abbreviation: CT
- Founder: Ronal Umaña
- Founded: October 2024; 1 year ago
- Colors: Green, yellow
- Seats in the Legislative Assembly: 0 / 60
- Municipalities: 0 / 44
- Seats in PARLACEN: 0 / 20

Cambio Total (Spanish for "Total Change") is a Salvadoran political party. It was established in 2024 by Ronal Umaña and opposes the government of President Nayib Bukele.

== History ==
In October 2024, Salvadoran politician Ronal Umaña announced he was organizing a political party named Cambio Total (Spanish for "Total Change"). In an interview with Mágico TV, Umaña stated that Cambio Total "is not an electoral party, it is a party to fight against the dictatorship" ("no es un partido electorero, es un partido para luchar contra la dictadura"), referring to the government of President Nayib Bukele. Umaña named the party "Total Change" as he refers to Bukele's government as "total chaos" ("caos total").

In a February 2025 interview with TVX, Umaña described Cambio Total as "a party of war, not electoral" ("un partido de guerra, no electorero"). In July 2025, stated that the party aimed to consolidate El Salvador's political opposition ahead of the next presidential election and indicated that some members of the Nationalist Republican Alliance (ARENA) and Farabundo Martí National Liberation Front (FMLN) supported Cambio Total. Umaña has indicated the need to "found a new republic" ("fundar una nueva república") after Bukele leaves office.

On 9 July 2025, Umaña made a post on X revealing the party's logo consisting of a yellow sun on a green background. In August 2025, Umaña suggested nominating La Prensa Gráfica contributor José Miguel Fortín Magaña and economist Evelyn Martínez as Cambio Total's presidential and vice presidential candidates, respectively, for the 2027 presidential election.

== Electoral history ==
=== Presidential elections ===
Election	Candidate	Votes	%	Pos.	Result
2027	Not registered				

=== Legislative Assembly elections ===
Election	Votes	%	Position	Seats	+/–	Status in legislature
2027	Not registered					Extraparliamentary

=== Municipal elections ===
Election	Votes	%	Position	Seats	+/–
2027	Not registered				

== See also ==
- List of political parties in El Salvador
