= Cape Verde at the FIFA World Cup =

International football delegation

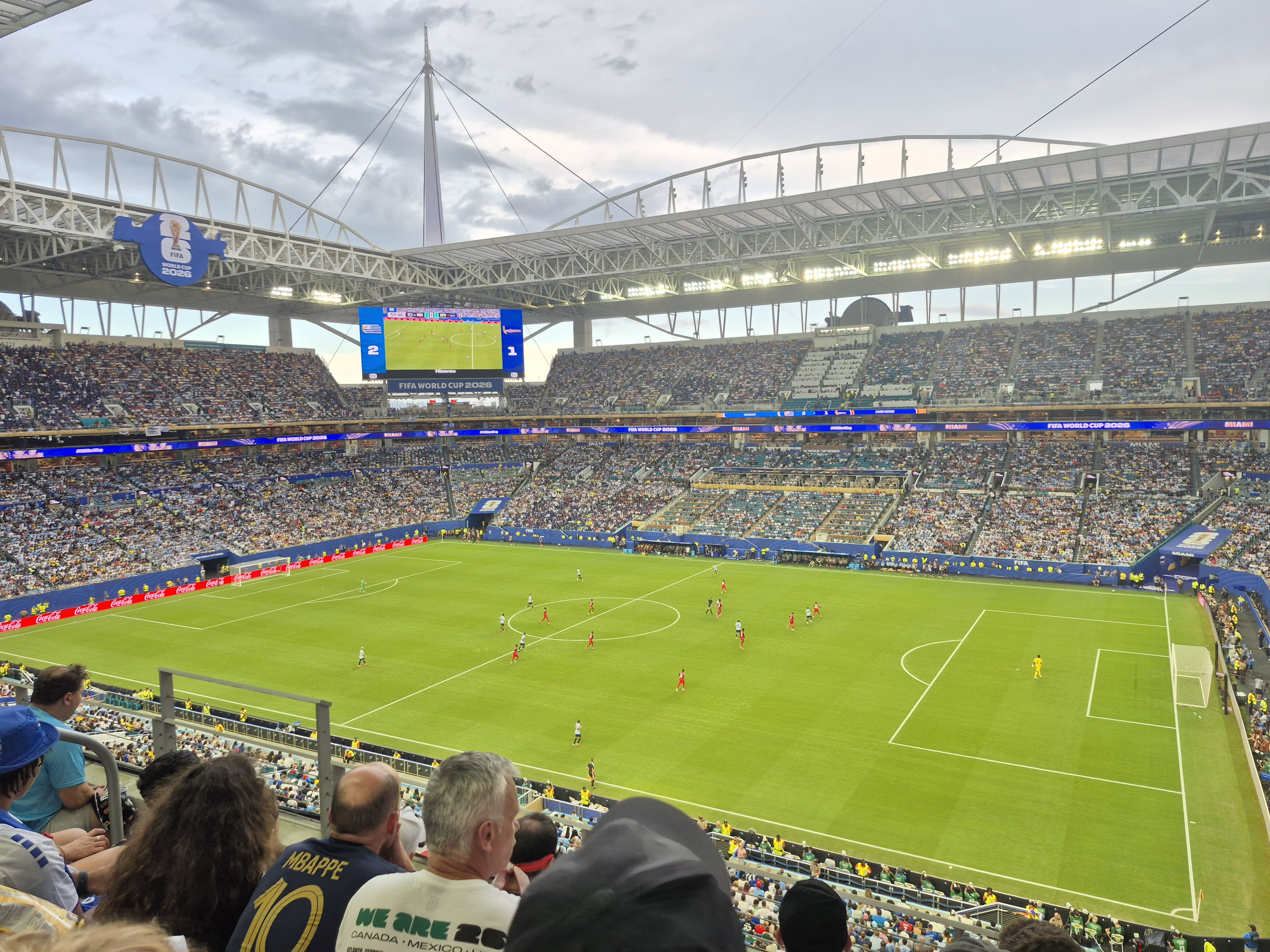
Cape Verde facing Uruguay at the 2026 FIFA World Cup

Cape Verde appeared in their first FIFA World Cup in 2026. In their debut match against Spain, they drew 0–0, earning their first point in World Cup history.

On 13 October 2025, they qualified for the World Cup for the first time after a 3–0 victory over Eswatini. At the time of their qualification, Cape Verde was noted as the smallest country by land area and the second-least-populated country to qualify for the World Cup, with a land area of 4,033 square kilometres (1,557 sq mi) and a population of just under 525,000. However, after the qualification of Curaçao's team a month later, Cape Verde became the second-smallest country by land area and the third-least-populated.

The team was drawn into Group H alongside Spain, Uruguay, and Saudi Arabia. In their first ever World Cup game, they caused a major upset by drawing 0–0 to Spain. That upset was furthered by a 2–2 draw against Uruguay and a 0–0 draw against Saudi Arabia to finish second in their group, thereby becoming the smallest-ever nation to reach the knockout stages of a FIFA World Cup.

In the round of 32, Cape Verde lost 3-2 to defending champions Argentina in extra-time, eliminating Cape Verde from the competition.

== Overall record ==
FIFA World Cup record										Qualification record					
Year	Round	Position	Pld	W	D*	L	GF	GA	Squad	Pld	W	D	L	GF	GA
1930 to 1974	Part of Portugal									Part of Portugal					
1978 and 1982	Not a member of FIFA									Not a member of FIFA					
1986 to 1998	Did not enter									Did not enter					
(South Korea) (Japan) 2002	Did not qualify									2	0	1	1	0	2
(Germany) 2006	Did not qualify									12	4	2	6	12	16
(South Africa) 2010	Did not qualify									6	3	0	3	7	8
(Brazil) 2014	Did not qualify									6	3	0	3	9	7
(Russia) 2018	Did not qualify									8	3	0	5	6	13
(Qatar) 2022	Did not qualify									6	3	2	1	8	6
(Canada) (Mexico) (United States) 2026	Round of 32	32nd	4	0	3	1	4	5	Squad	10	7	2	1	16	8
(Morocco) (Portugal) (Spain) 2030	To be determined									To be determined					
(Saudi Arabia) 2034	To be determined									To be determined					
Total	Round of 32	2/23	4	0	3	1	4	5	—	50	22	8	20	52	57

== Goalscorers ==
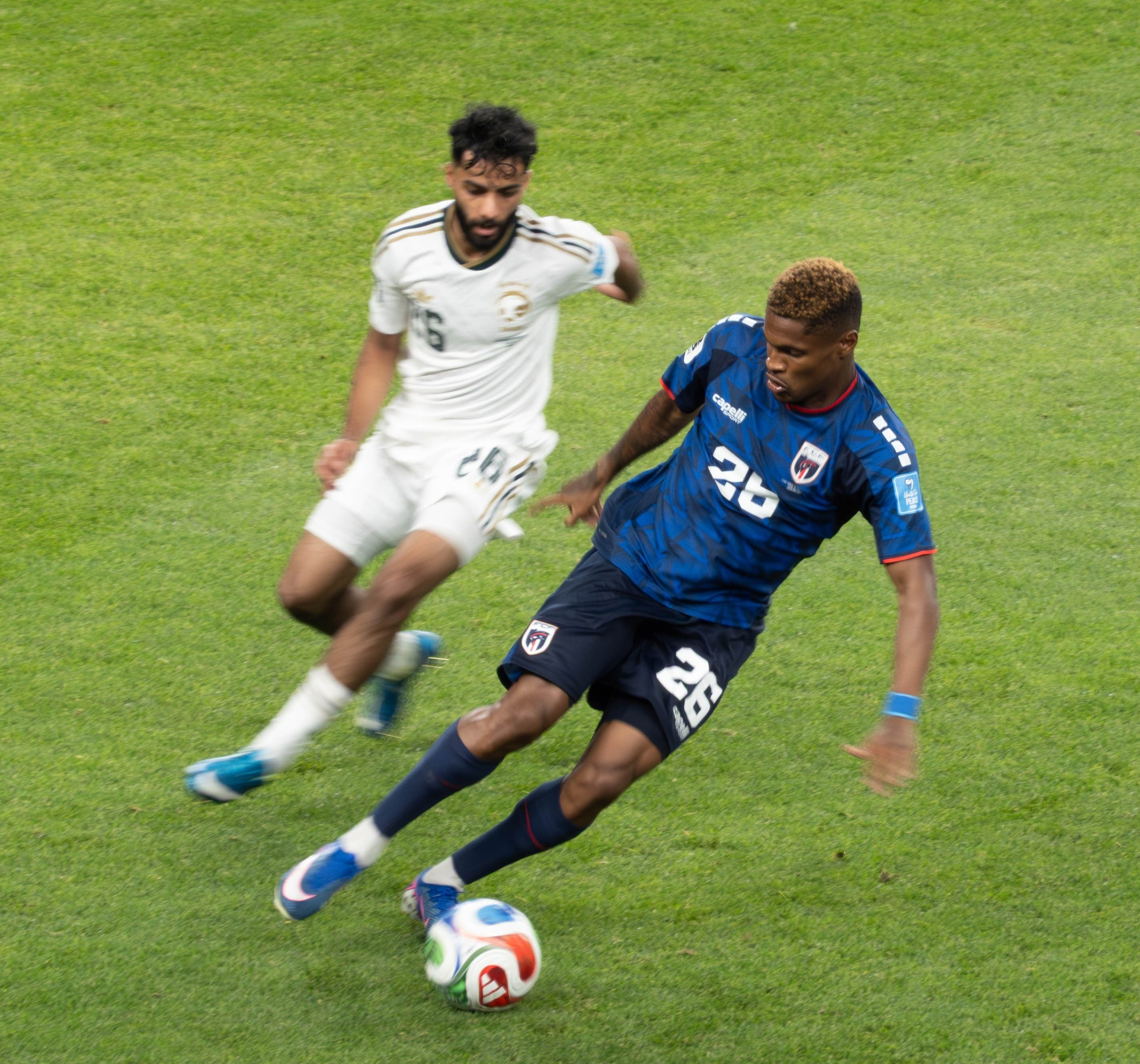
Hélio Varela is one of Cape Verde's goalscorers

On 21 June 2026, Kevin Pina made football history by scoring Cape Verde's first-ever FIFA World Cup goal, doing so in the 21st minute of their second group stage match against Uruguay in Miami.

Player	Goals	2026
Kevin Pina	1	1
Hélio Varela	1	1
Deroy Duarte	1	1
Sidny Lopes Cabral	1	1
Total	4	4

== Tournaments ==
=== 2026 FIFA World Cup ===
==== Group stage ====
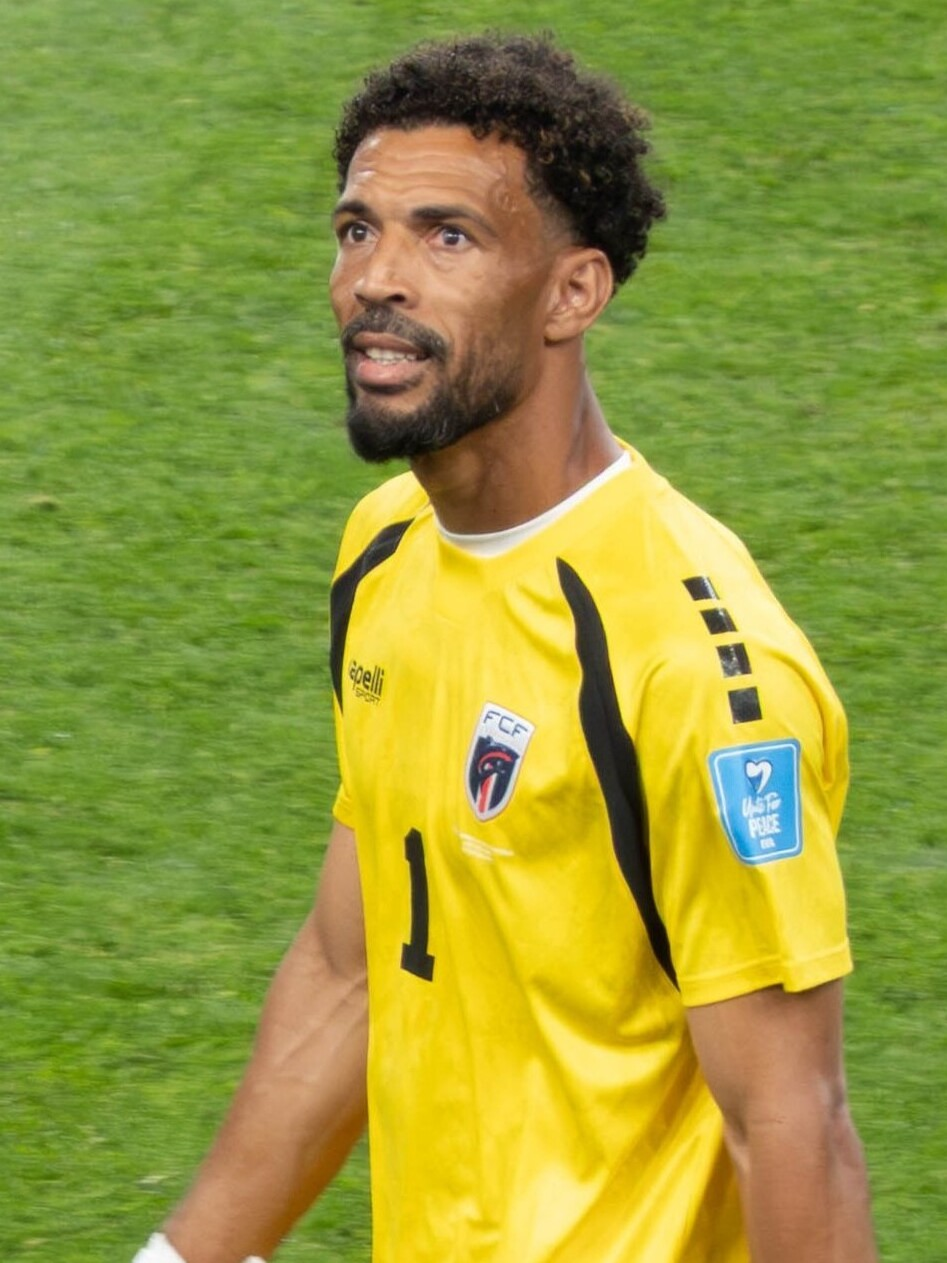
Vozinha surged in popularity during the tournament.

Pos	Team	Pld	W	D	L	GF	GA	GD	Pts	Qualification
1	Spain	3	2	1	0	5	0	+5	7	Advance to knockout stage
2	Cape Verde	3	0	3	0	2	2	0	3	Advance to knockout stage
3	Uruguay	3	0	2	1	3	4	−1	2 (Note: Tied on head-to-head result (Saudi Arabia 1–1 Uruguay). Overall goal difference was used as the tiebreaker.)	
4	Saudi Arabia	3	0	2	1	1	5	−4	2	

Source: FIFA
Rules for classification: Group stage tiebreakers
Notes:
June 15, 2026
12:00 p.m. UTC−4

Spain	0–0	Cape Verde
	(Note: "Spain vs Cabo Verde | First Stage | FIFA World Cup 2026". FIFA. Retrieved June 15, 2026.; "Match Report – Group H – Spain v. Cabo Verde". FIFA. Retrieved June 15, 2026.; "Post match summary report – Group H – Spain v. Cabo Verde". FIFA. June 15, 2026. Retrieved June 17, 2026.)

Mercedes-Benz Stadium, Atlanta
Attendance: 67,640
Referee: Adham Makhadmeh (Jordan)

June 21, 2026
6:00 p.m. UTC−4

Uruguay	2–2	Cape Verde
M. Araújo 44'; Canobbio 45+6'	(Note: "Uruguay vs Cabo Verde | First Stage | FIFA World Cup 2026". FIFA. Retrieved June 22, 2026.; "Match Report – Group H – Uruguay v. Cabo Verde". FIFA. June 22, 2026. Retrieved June 22, 2026.; "Post match summary report – Group H – Uruguay v. Cabo Verde". FIFA. June 22, 2026. Retrieved June 22, 2026.)	K. Pina 21'; Varela 61'

Hard Rock Stadium, Miami Gardens
Attendance: 64,003
Referee: Espen Eskås (Norway)

June 26, 2026
7:00 p.m. UTC−5

Cape Verde	0–0	Saudi Arabia
	(Note: "Cabo Verde vs Saudi Arabia | First Stage | FIFA World Cup 2026". FIFA. Retrieved June 27, 2026.; "Match Report – Group H – Cabo Verde v. Saudi Arabia". FIFA. June 27, 2026. Retrieved June 27, 2026.; "Post match summary report – Group H – Cabo Verde v. Saudi Arabia". FIFA. June 27, 2026. Retrieved June 27, 2026.)

NRG Stadium, Houston
Attendance: 68,278
Referee: François Letexier (France)

==== Knockout stage ====
Round of 32

July 3, 2026
6:00 p.m. UTC−4

Argentina	3–2 (a.e.t.)	Cape Verde
Messi 29'; Li. Martínez 92'; Diney 111' (o.g.)	(Note: "Argentina vs Cabo Verde | Round of 32 | FIFA World Cup 2026". FIFA. Retrieved July 4, 2026.; "Match Report – Round of 32 – Argentina v. Cabo Verde". FIFA. July 4, 2026. Retrieved July 4, 2026.; "Post match summary report – Round of 32 – Argentina v. Cabo Verde". FIFA. July 3, 2026. Retrieved July 4, 2026.)	D. Duarte 59'; Lopes Cabral 103'

Hard Rock Stadium, Miami Gardens
Attendance: 64,478
Referee: Drew Fischer (Canada)

==== Off-field developments ====
During the tournament, New Zealand Police confirmed that captain Ryan Mendes was under investigation over an allegation of rape relating to an incident reported at a hotel in Auckland in March 2026, when the squad had been in the city for FIFA Series friendlies. The complainant had worked as an interpreter for the delegation. No charges were laid, and the allegation has not been tested in court. FIFA said it was in contact with the New Zealand authorities, and neither FIFA nor the Cape Verdean federation announced any disciplinary action.

== See also ==
- African nations at the FIFA World Cup
- Cape Verde at the Africa Cup of Nations
