= List of universities in El Salvador =

This is a list of universities and specialized institutions in El Salvador.

== Universities ==
=== Public ===
- University of El Salvador, UES

=== Private ===
- José Matías Delgado University, UJMD
- Francisco Gavidia University, UFG
- José Simeón Cañas Central American University, UCA El Salvador
- Universidad Albert Einstein, UAE
- Universidad Autónoma de Santa Ana, UNASA
- Universidad Católica de El Salvador, UNICAES
- Universidad Cristiana de las Asambleas de Dios, UCAD
- Universidad de Nueva San Salvador UNSSA
- Universidad de Oriente (El Salvador), UNIVO
- Universidad de Sonsonate, USO
- Universidad Don Bosco, UDB
- Universidad Dr. Andrés Bello, UAB
- Universidad Evangélica de El Salvador, UEES
- Universidad Gerardo Barrios, UGB
- Universidad Internacional Nehemias, NIU
- Universidad Luterana Salvadoreña, ULS
- Universidad Modular Abierta, UMA
- Universidad Monseñor Oscar Arnulfo Romero, UMOAR
- Universidad Panamericana de El Salvador, UPAN
- Universidad Pedagógica de El Salvador
- Universidad Politécnica de El Salvador, UPESS
- Universidad Salvadoreña Alberto Masferrer, USAM
- Universidad Técnica Latinoamericana, UTLA
- Universidad Tecnológica de El Salvador, UTEC

== Specialized institutions ==
=== Public ===
- Escuela Especializada en Ingeniería FEPADE, ITCA-FEPADE
- Escuela Militar Capitán General Gerardo Barrios, EMCGGB
- Escuela Nacional de Agricultura "Roberto Quiñónez", ENA
- Escuela Superior Franciscana Especializada AGAPE, ESFE/AGAPE

=== Private ===
- Escuela de Comunicación Mónica Herrera
- Escuela Superior de Economia y Negocios, ESEN
- Instituto Superior de Economía y Administración de Empresas FEPADE, ISEADE-FEPADE
- Santa Ana Escuela de enfermería, Santa Ana
- Gran Universidad, San Salvador
- TECH Technological University

== See also ==
- Education in El Salvador
