= Ronal Umaña =

Salvadoran politician

Leader of Cambio Total
- Incumbent
- Assumed office October 2024
- Preceded by: Office established

Secretary-general of the Christian Democratic Party
- In office ? – June 2002
- Preceded by: René Aguiluz
- Succeeded by: René Aguiluz

Deputy of the Legislative Assembly of El Salvador from San Salvador
- In office 1 May 1997 – 1 May 2000

Personal details
- Born: El Salvador
- Party: Cambio Total (since 2024)
- Other political affiliations: Democratic Change; Christian Democratic Party
- Occupation: Politician, political analyst

Ronal Umaña is a Salvadoran politician and political analyst. Since 2024, he has been the leader of the Cambio Total political party. He previously served as a deputy of the Legislative Assembly of El Salvador from 1997 to 2000 and the leader of the Christian Democratic Party before 2002.

== Political career ==
Umaña was elected to the Legislative Assembly in 1997. He was the Legislative Assembly's third vice president from 1997 to 2000.

In June 2002, Umaña failed to be re-elected as the secretary-general of the Christian Democratic Party (PDC). He was succeeded by René Aguiluz. Aguiluz was succeeded by Rodolfo Parker later that year.

Umaña opposes the state of exception of the Salvadoran gang crackdown, arguing that "it was never needed" ("nunca se necesitó"). Umaña was a member of the "No to the Coup" Citizen Resistance Movement that proposed Joel Sánchez as a presidential candidate ahead of the 2024 election. Sánchez's candidacy was accepted by the Nationalist Republican Alliance, but he finished in third place behind Manuel Flores and winner Nayib Bukele.

In October 2024, Umaña founded the Cambio Total political party to oppose Bukele's government. In July 2025, Umaña indicated that a "new republic" ("nueva república") had to be founded after Bukele leaves office and called on El Salvador's opposition parties to rally behind Cambio Total ahead of the 2027 election. He claimed that some members of the Nationalist Republican Alliance (ARENA) and the Farabundo Martí National Liberation Front (FMLN) supported Cambio Total. In February 2026, according to Umaña, ARENA offered to nominate him as its candidate for mayor of San Salvador Centro or La Libertad Sur. Umaña said that he would accept this offer on the condition that ARENA, the FMLN, and Vamos form a coalition for the 2027 election.

Party political offices
Preceded by René Aguiluz	Secretary-General of the Christian Democratic Party ?–2002	Succeeded by René Aguiluz
New office	Leader of Cambio Total; 2024–present	Incumbent
