= Rigoberto Soto =

Salvadoran politician

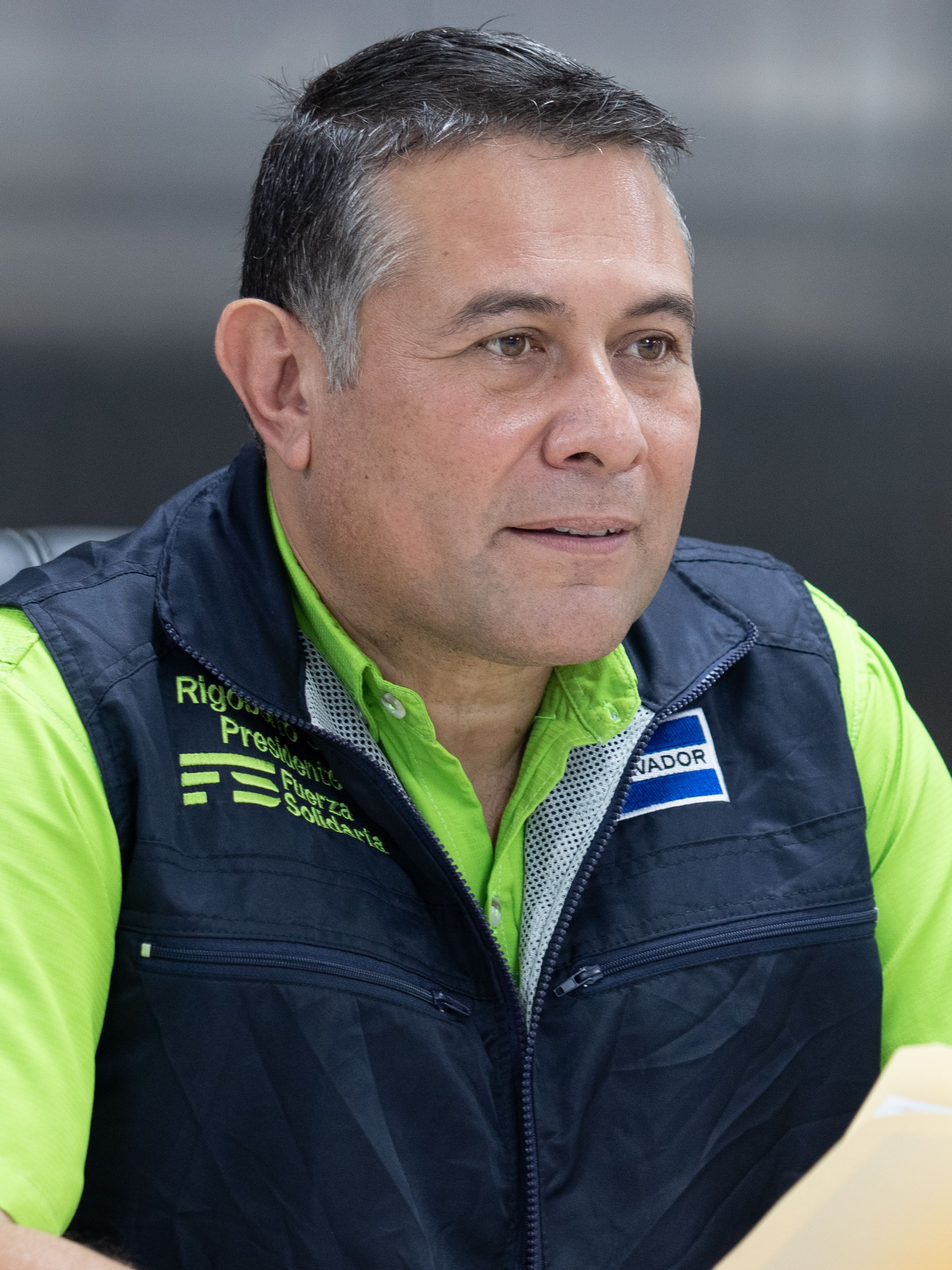
- Soto in 2023

Leader of Solidary Force
- Incumbent
- Assumed office 2019
- Preceded by: Office established

Deputy of the Legislative Assembly of El Salvador from Usulután
- In office 1 May 2009 – 11 June 2019

Personal details
- Born: Manuel Rigoberto Soto Lazo; 20 December 1969 (age 56)
- Party: Solidary Force (since 2019)
- Other political affiliations: Grand Alliance for National Unity (2013–2019); Nationalist Republican Alliance (until 2013)
- Spouse: Vanessa María Handal de Lazo
- Education: José Matías Delgado University
- Occupation: Politician, businessman

Manuel Rigoberto Soto Lazo (born 20 December 1969) is a Salvadoran politician and businessman who served as the leader of the Solidary Force (FS) political party since 2019. He previously served as a member of the Legislative Assembly of El Salvador from 2009 to 2019 as a member of the Nationalist Republican Alliance (ARENA) and later the Grand Alliance for National Unity (GANA).

== Early life ==
Manuel Rigoberto Soto Lazo was born on 20 December 1969. Soto attended the San Agustín School in Usulután from 1974 to 1976 and then the San Francisco School in San Salvador from 1977 to 1979. He attended the Escuela Panamericana from 1980 to 1987 and later the José Matías Delgado University from 1988 to 1992.

Soto founded an agricultural company in 1993. He founded and was the first president of the Association of Loroco Producers of El Salvador from 2002 to 2004. He was the director agricultural business for the Ministry of Agriculture and Livestock from 2004 to 2009.

== Political career ==
Soto was elected as a supplemental deputy of the Legislative Assembly of El Salvador in 2006 as a member of the Nationalist Republican Alliance (ARENA). He was elected as a proprietary member in 2009 and was re-elected in 2012. Soto was expelled from ARENA for alleged disloyalty and allegedly buying votes. He joined the Grand Alliance for National Unity (GANA).

Sometime before June 2019, Soto established the Solidary Force political party, a party involving former members of ARENA and GANA. In June 2019, President Nayib Bukele appointed Soto as Vice Minister of Agriculture and Livestock. He left office by late 2020. In February 2022, Soto stated that Solidary Force was open to letting Bukele seek re-election with it in the event that he did not seek re-election with GANA. The Supreme Electoral Court (TSE) registered Solidary Force as a political party in February 2023.

In 2025, the Office of the Attorney General (FGR) accused Soto of embezzling US$392,989.62 while serving as a deputy and charged him with illicit enrichment.

== Personal life ==
Soto is married to Vanessa María Handal de Lazo. Soto can speak Spanish and English.

Party political offices
New office	Leader of Solidary Force; 2019–present	Incumbent
