= Cape Verde at the Africa Cup of Nations =

Cape Verde has participated four times in the Africa Cup of Nations. On 14 October 2012, Cape Verde managed to secure their first ever berth in the Finals of the 2013 Africa Cup of Nations, when they defeated Cameroon 3–2 on aggregate score, following a 2–1 defeat to Cameroon at the Ahmadou Ahidjo Stadium in Yaoundé, having won the home leg 2–0 at the Estádio da Várzea in Praia just weeks prior to their qualification.

== Overall record ==
Africa Cup of Nations record										Qualification record					
Year	Round	Position	Pld	W	D*	L	GF	GA	Squad	Pld	W	D*	L	GF	GA
(Sudan) 1957 – (Egypt) 1974	Part of Portugal									Part of Portugal					
(Ethiopia) 1976 – (Senegal) 1992	Not a member of CAF									Not a member of CAF					
(Tunisia) 1994	Did not qualify									2	1	0	1	2	4
(South Africa) 1996	Withdrew									Withdrew					
(Burkina Faso) 1998	Did not enter									Did not enter					
(Ghana) (Nigeria) 2000	Did not qualify									2	0	1	1	0	3
(Mali) 2002	Did not qualify									2	0	1	1	1	2
(Tunisia) 2004	Did not qualify									6	3	0	3	9	8
(Egypt) 2006	Did not qualify									12	4	2	8	11	16
(Ghana) 2008	Did not qualify									6	1	2	3	3	10
(Angola) 2010	Did not qualify									6	3	0	3	7	8
(Equatorial Guinea) (Gabon) 2012	Did not qualify									6	3	1	2	7	7
(South Africa) 2013	Quarter-finals	7th	4	1	2	1	3	4	Squad	4	4	0	0	10	3
(Equatorial Guinea) 2015	Group stage	11th	3	0	3	0	1	1	Squad	6	4	0	2	9	6
(Gabon) 2017	Did not qualify									6	3	0	3	10	7
(Egypt) 2019	Did not qualify									6	1	2	3	4	5
(Cameroon) 2021	Round of 16	15th	4	1	1	2	2	4	Squad	6	2	4	0	6	3
(Ivory Coast) 2023	Quarter-finals	5th	5	3	2	0	8	3	Squad	6	3	1	2	8	6
(Morocco) 2025	Did not qualify									6	1	1	4	3	7
(Kenya) (Tanzania) (Uganda) 2027	To be determined									To be determined					
2029	To be determined									To be determined					
Total	Quarter-finals	4/35	16	5	8	3	14	12	—	82	33	15	34	90	95

== Tournaments ==
=== 2013 Africa Cup of Nations ===
==== Group stage ====
Pos	Team	Pld	W	D	L	GF	GA	GD	Pts	Qualification
1	South Africa (H)	3	1	2	0	4	2	+2	5	Advance to knockout stage
2	Cape Verde	3	1	2	0	3	2	+1	5	Advance to knockout stage
3	Morocco	3	0	3	0	3	3	0	3	
4	Angola	3	0	1	2	1	4	−3	1	

Source: CAF
(H) Hosts
19 January 2013
18:00

South Africa	0–0	Cape Verde
	Report

Soccer City, Johannesburg
Attendance: 50,000
Referee: Djamel Haimoudi (Algeria)

23 January 2013
20:00

Morocco	1–1	Cape Verde
El-Arabi 78'	Report	Platini 35'

Moses Mabhida Stadium, Durban
Attendance: 25,000
Referee: Janny Sikazwe (Zambia)

27 January 2013
19:00

Cape Verde	2–1	Angola
F. Varela 81'; Héldon 90+1'	Report	Nando 33' (o.g.)

Nelson Mandela Bay Stadium, Port Elizabeth
Attendance: 20,000
Referee: Slim Jedidi (Tunisia)

==== Quarter-finals ====
2 February 2013
17:00

Ghana	2–0	Cape Verde
Wakaso 54' (pen.), 90+5'	Report

Nelson Mandela Bay Stadium, Port Elizabeth
Attendance: 8,000
Referee: Rajindraparsad Seechurn (Mauritius)

=== 2015 Africa Cup of Nations ===
==== Group stage ====
Pos	Team	Pld	W	D	L	GF	GA	GD	Pts	Qualification
1	Tunisia	3	1	2	0	4	3	+1	5	Advance to knockout stage
2	DR Congo	3	0	3	0	2	2	0	3	Advance to knockout stage
3	Cape Verde	3	0	3	0	1	1	0	3	
4	Zambia	3	0	2	1	2	3	−1	2	

Source: CAF
18 January 2015
20:00

Tunisia	1–1	Cape Verde
Manser 70'	Report	Héldon 78' (pen.)

Estadio de Ebibeyin, Ebibeyin
Attendance: 7,479
Referee: Eric Otogo-Castane (Gabon)

22 January 2015
20:00

Cape Verde	0–0	DR Congo
	Report

Estadio de Ebibeyin, Ebibeyin
Attendance: 7,680
Referee: Malang Diedhiou (Senegal)

26 January 2015
19:00

Cape Verde	0–0	Zambia
	Report

Estadio de Ebibeyin, Ebibeyin
Attendance: 7,950
Referee: Sidi Alioum (Cameroon)

=== 2021 Africa Cup of Nations ===
==== Group stage ====
Pos	Team	Pld	W	D	L	GF	GA	GD	Pts	Qualification
1	Cameroon (H)	3	2	1	0	7	3	+4	7	Advance to knockout stage
2	Burkina Faso	3	1	1	1	3	3	0	4 (Note: Head-to-head result: Cape Verde 0–1 Burkina Faso.)	Advance to knockout stage
3	Cape Verde	3	1	1	1	2	2	0	4	Advance to knockout stage
4	Ethiopia	3	0	1	2	2	6	−4	1	

Source: CAF
(H) Hosts
Notes:
9 January 2022
20:00

Ethiopia	0–1	Cape Verde
	Report	J. Tavares 45+1'

Olembe Stadium, Yaoundé
Referee: Hélder Martins de Carvalho (Angola)

13 January 2022
20:00

Cape Verde	0–1	Burkina Faso
	Report	Bandé 39'

Olembe Stadium, Yaoundé
Referee: Amin Omar (Egypt)

17 January 2022
17:00

Cape Verde	1–1	Cameroon
Rodrigues 53'	Report	Aboubakar 39'

Olembe Stadium, Yaoundé
Referee: Sadok Selmi (Tunisia)

==== Round of 16 ====
25 January 2022
17:00

Senegal	2–0	Cape Verde
Mané 63'; B. Dieng 90+2'	Report

Kouekong Stadium, Bafoussam
Referee: Lahlou Benbraham (Algeria)

=== 2023 Africa Cup of Nations ===
==== Group stage ====
Pos	Team	Pld	W	D	L	GF	GA	GD	Pts	Qualification
1	Cape Verde	3	2	1	0	7	3	+4	7	Advance to knockout stage
2	Egypt	3	0	3	0	6	6	0	3	Advance to knockout stage
3	Ghana	3	0	2	1	5	6	−1	2 (Note: Tied on head-to-head points. Overall goal difference: Ghana −1, Mozambique −3.)	
4	Mozambique	3	0	2	1	4	7	−3	2	

Source: CAF
Notes:
14 January 2024
20:00

Ghana	1–2	Cape Verde
Djiku 56'	Report	Monteiro 17'; Rodrigues 90+2'

Felix Houphouet Boigny Stadium, Abidjan
Attendance: 11,943
Referee: Jean-Jacques Ndala (DR Congo)

19 January 2024
14:00

Cape Verde	3–0	Mozambique
Bebé 32'; Mendes 51'; Pina 69'	Report

Felix Houphouet Boigny Stadium, Abidjan
Attendance: 5,794
Referee: Samir Guezzaz (Morocco)

22 January 2024
20:00

Cape Verde	2–2	Egypt
G. Tavares 45+1'; Teixeira 90+9'	Report	Trézéguet 50'; Mohamed 90+3'

Felix Houphouet Boigny Stadium, Abidjan
Attendance: 15,650
Referee: Alhadi Allaou Mahamat (Chad)

==== Round of 16 ====
29 January 2024
17:00

Cape Verde	1–0	Mauritania
Mendes 88' (pen.)	Report

Felix Houphouet Boigny Stadium, Abidjan
Attendance: 16,088
Referee: Mohamed Adel (Egypt)

==== Quarter-finals ====
3 February 2024
20:00

Cape Verde	0–0 (a.e.t.)	South Africa
	Report
Penalties
Bebé (penalty missed); Semedo (penalty missed); L. Duarte (penalty missed); Teixeira (penalty scored); Andrade (penalty missed)	1–2	(penalty scored) Mokoena; (penalty missed) Lepasa; (penalty missed) Modiba; (penalty scored) Mvala

Charles Konan Banny Stadium, Yamoussoukro
Attendance: 12,162
Referee: Jean-Jacques Ndala (DR Congo)
