= Mario Vega (pastor) =

Leading the Evangelizing Mission

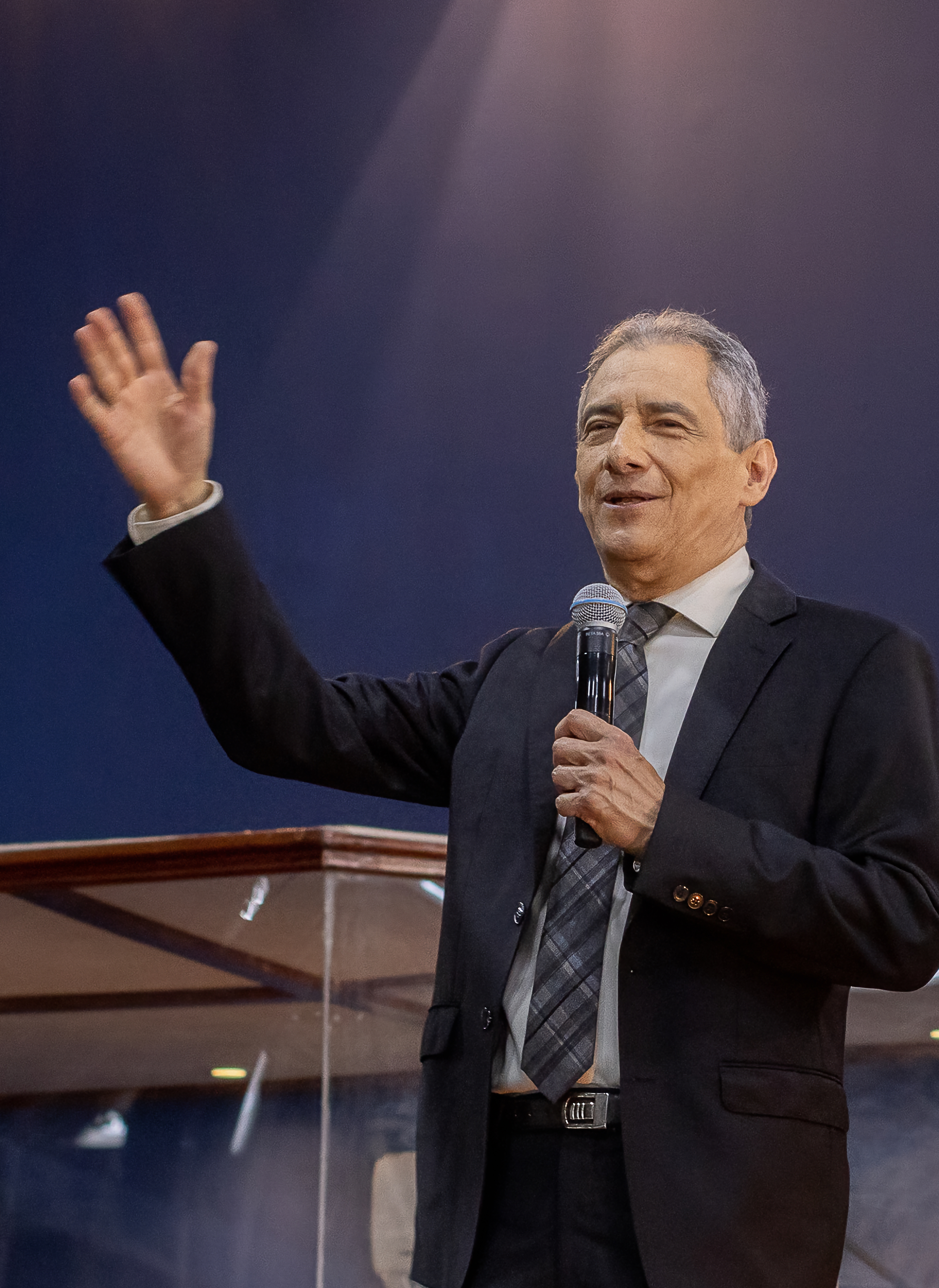
- Vega in 2023
- Born: 1958 (age 67–68); San Salvador, El Salvador
- Occupation: Senior pastor
- Spouse: Cecilia de Vega
- Children: 1

Mario Vega (born 1958) is a Christian Pentecostal pastor, leader of the Misión Cristiana Elim Internacional, a megachurch in San Salvador, El Salvador. He is married to Cecilia de Vega, with whom he has a son.

== Biography ==
Mario Vega was born in San Salvador, El Salvador, in 1958. He is brought up in a respectful Catholic family. On January 19, 1975, at 17, he visited, an evangelical church for the first time, La Peña de Horeb in Soyapango, with his cousin. A week later, on January 26, he decided to give his life to Jesus. Sometime later, he finishes high school and he answers the call of the ministry, despite the misunderstanding of his family, which sees this as an outlet for those who have not succeeded.

== Ministry ==
On April 13, 1980, at the age of 22, Mario Vega was sent to Santa Ana for a church of the Misión Cristiana Elim Internacional. In July, he was ordained pastor by Sergio Daniel Solórzano Aldana. In 1997, Mario Vega became senior pastor of Misión Cristiana Elim Internacional, San Salvador. He is considered as a resource person to shed light on certain social issues. It is also involved in the fight against poverty by setting up concrete programs with the Church; Training in employment, environmental education, testing for HIV.

== Politics ==
Vega declined an offer by Gerardo Awad of the Salvadoran Independent Party (PAIS) to run as his vice presidential candidate during the 2024 Salvadoran presidential election.

== See also ==
- Misión Cristiana Elim Internacional
