= José Matías Delgado University =

Private university in Antiguo Cuscatlán, El Salvador

Dr. José Matías Delgado University
- Universidad Dr. José Matías Delgado
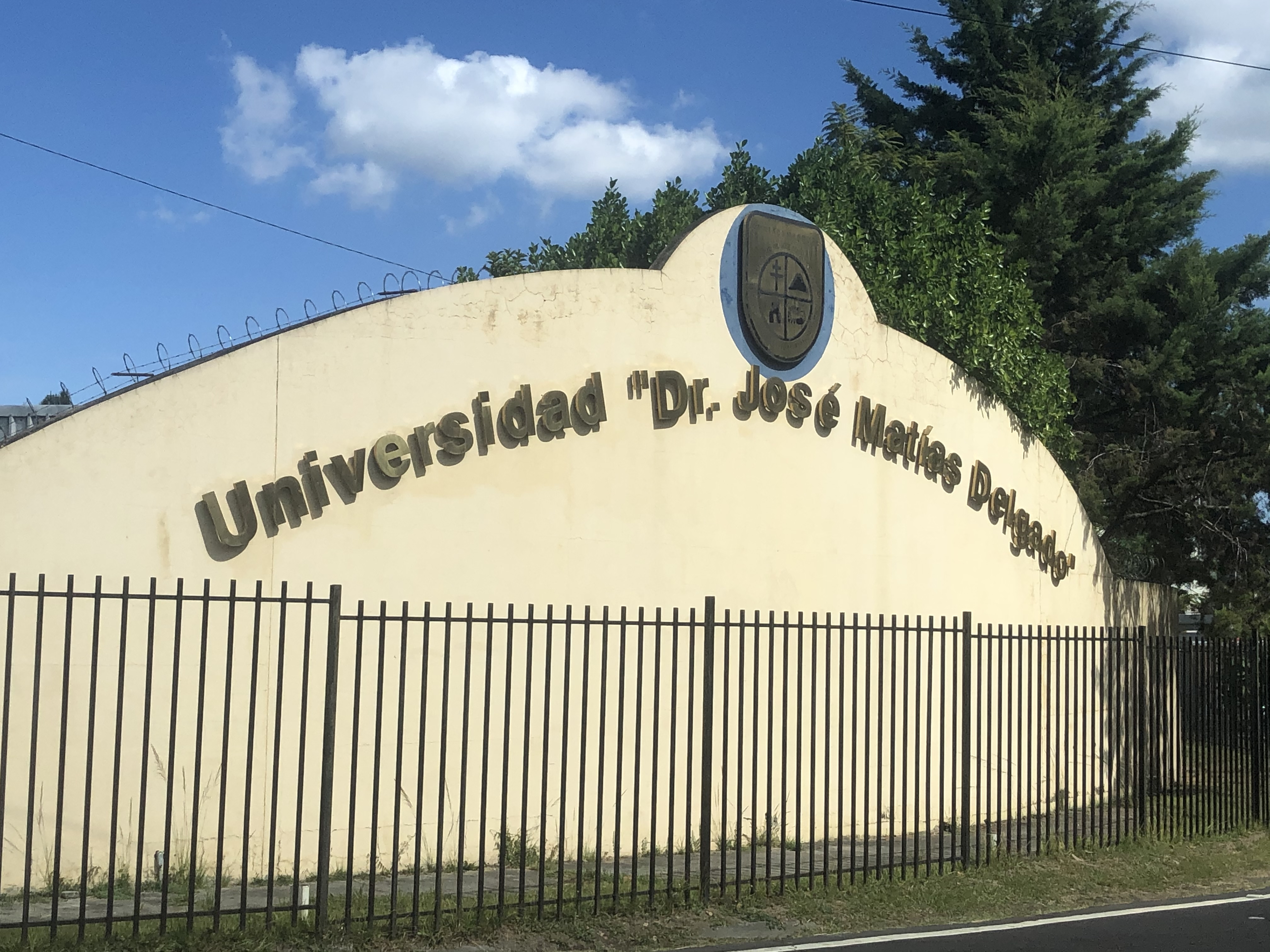
- Motto: Omnia Cum Honore (Latin)
- Motto in English: Everything with Honor
- Type: Private
- Established: 15 September 1977; 48 years ago
- Rector: José Enrique Sorto Campbell
- Faculty: 678 (2016)
- Students: 7,624 (2016)
- Location: Antiguo Cuscatlán, La Libertad, El Salvador; 13°40′31″N 89°15′25″W
- Campus: Urban
- Colors: Navy Blue, Gold, Black
- Nickname: La Matías
- Website: www.ujmd.edu.sv
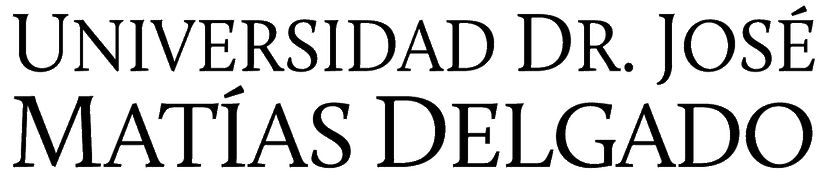

Dr. José Matías Delgado University (Spanish: Universidad Dr. José Matías Delgado, UJMD), is a private university located in Antiguo Cuscatlán, La Libertad, El Salvador. Founded on September 15, 1977, it was one of the first private institutions of higher education established in the country.

== History ==
Named in honor of Salvadoran priest, lawyer, politician and national hero José Matías Delgado, UJMD, also known as "La Matías", was conceived as a nonprofit institution by Salvadoran intellectuals, academics and businessmen, its main objective being the formation of professionals with the capability of improving and directing the business and judicial institutions of the time. Its intent, from its foundation in 1977, has been to defend and develop free market principles.

By 1978 the University began its academic activities with three faculties: the "Dr. Isidro Menéndez" Faculty of Jurisprudence and Social Sciences; the "Dr. Santiago I. Barberena" Faculty of Economics and the "Francisco Gavidia" Faculty of General Culture and Fine Arts. Following the events of the Salvadoran Civil War, the University continued its activities despite the circumstances of the conflict, increasing the demand of higher education at the time where new faculties and careers developed. It was geographically decentralized during its early years in San Salvador, but was brought together on a single location (the current campus, in the municipality of Antiguo Cuscatlán) in 1986; in 1992 the faculties of Agriculture and Engineering were created and then in 1993 with the faculty of Health Sciences. Between 2004 and 2005 a second campus was opened, relocating the Economics and Jurisprudence faculties; in 2008 another campus was established in the municipality of Soyapango by an agreement with the Padre Arrupe Foundation, becoming a specialized nursing school.

It offers 27 undergraduate degrees, 11 postgraduate degrees and a large variety of diplomas and courses for continuing education, consisting of a faculty of more than 600 professors. Since its foundation until 2018, the University was administrated by well-known Salvadoran writer, dramatist and jurist, David Escobar Galindo.

== Campus ==
The University currently has two campuses, with the following faculties and schools:

=== Main Campus ===
- Faculty of Arts and Sciences "Francisco Gavidia"
  - School of Architecture
  - School of Design "Rosemarie Vázquez de Ángel"
  - School of Communications
  - School of Psychology
  - School of Fine Arts
- Faculty of Health Sciences "Dr. Luis Edmundo Vásquez"
- Faculty of Agriculture and Agricultural Research "Julia Hill de O'Sullivan"
- Faculty of Engineering
- Faculty of Postgraduate and Continuing Education

=== Second Campus ===
- Faculty of Jurisprudence and Social Sciences
- Faculty of Economics, Enterprise and Business

The University has libraries in each campus, which possess a large quantity of digital and printed resources, including 19th century bibliographic accounts. Additionally, it has technical workshops, sports fields, computing centers, medical clinics with psychological assistance and laboratories for chemistry, physics, medicine and agricultural research, among others.

== Academics ==
=== Undergraduate programs ===
José Matías Delgado University allows students to qualify for the following professional areas and degrees:

- Medicine
- Nursing
- Food Engineering
- Agroindustrial Engineering
- Agricultural Biotechnology Engineering
- Environmental Management Engineering
- Industrial Engineering
- Logistics and Distribution Engineering
- Electronics and Communications Engineering
- Architecture
- Interior Architecture
- Graphic Design
- Craft Design
- Communication Sciences
- Psychology
- Performing Arts
- Music
- Law
- International Relations
- Business Administration
- Business Economics
- Business Finance
- Marketing
- Accounting
- Information Technology
- Tourism

=== Postgraduate programs ===
Postgraduate studies at José Matías Delgado University consist of the following professional areas and degrees:

==== Master degrees ====
- Constitutional Law
- Administrative Law
- Business Administration
- Business Finance
- International Business
- Project Management
- Strategic Human Resources
- Organizational Communication
- Clinical Psychology
- Public Administration

==== Doctorate degrees ====
- Private Law

== Student life ==
La Matías offers the opportunity for students to get involved in extracurricular activities like theatre groups, musical choirs, volunteering and sports like the following: chess, soccer, track and field, swimming, basketball, volleyball and taekwondo, among others. It also provides foreign language education like English (which is an academic requirement for graduation), French, Italian and Portuguese.

== Distinctions ==
Since its foundation, the University has recognized the works of outstanding Savadoran people in their service for the country's community, being the following:

=== Honoris causa ===
- Guillermo Trigueros
- Luis Escalante Arce
- Alfonso Rochac
- Jorge Lardé y Larín
- Mercedes de Altamirano
- Didine Poma de Rossotto
- María de Boet
- Cecilia Gallardo de Cano
- Armando Calderón Sol
- Felicidad Salazar-Simpson
- Carlos Quintanilla Schmidt
- Francisco Calleja

=== Meritorious professors ===
- Adolfo Oscar Miranda
- Manuel Arrieta Gallegos
- Julia Díaz

== See also ==
- Education in El Salvador
- List of universities in El Salvador
