= Misión Cristiana Elim Internacional =

Para Las Buenas Nuevas de Salvación

- Orientation: Pentecostal, Evangelical
- Headquarters: San Salvador, El Salvador
- Origin: 1977
- Official website: elim.org.sv

Misión Cristiana Elim Internacional is a pentecostal megachurch (known as "Elim Central") and a worldwide organization of churches based in San Salvador, El Salvador. The senior pastor of this community is Mario Vega since 1997. In 2015, the attendance is more than 80,000 people only in San Salvador.

== History ==
In May 1977, the church was founded at the Santa Lucia neighborhood in Ilopango, El Salvador, by Sergio Daniel Solórzano Aldana. following an evangelistic campaign conducted on May 28, by Dr. Othoniel Rios Paredes, pastor of Elim Christian Mission in Guatemala. A total of nine people witnessed the founding of the Elim mission in El Salvador.

In 1983, the mission in El Salvador separated from that of Guatemala over doctrinal disagreements. Due to the complicated nature of changing the official name of the church in the midst of civil war, the church retained the name "Misión Cristiana Elim de El Salvador", which still holds until today. The church in Guatemala changed its name to "Partners Area Elim Ministries" and later "Elim Ministries".

In 1985 the church in San Salvador had about 3,000 people. Elim decided to develop the prayer cell concept of Yoido Full Gospel Church, South Korea. On July 13, 1986, the church opened a radio station named "Radio Restoration" which became one of the country's top religious radio stations ever since. In 1988, the attendance rose to 20,000.

In the mid-1990s Pastor Solorzano experienced a spiritual crisis in his personal life that resulted in the naming of a new senior pastor to look after MCEI. Solorzano eventually overcame his doubts and went on to establish another congregation called "La Palabra Viva" (The Living Word) in the late 1990s, which continues to flourish to this day.

In 1997, Mario Vega became senior pastor. He is considered as a resource person to shed light on some social issues.

MCEI owns 6 radio stations under the name "Radio Restauracion" in El Salvador and Los Angeles and is in the process of building an 11,000-seat auditorium and television studio in San Salvador.

Once known as the second largest single church in the world, the ministry has a membership that surpasses 115,000 people and has, at its peak, numbered as much as 200,000. MCEI has more than 500 full-time pastors in El Salvador alone. The church is known for its "Time of Restoration" events in which hundreds of thousands of people gather from all around the world to worship together. These events have sometimes been held simultaneously in all the major sports stadiums in El Salvador.

In 2025, the Church had 50,000 people.

== Organization ==
Elim Christian Mission International is run by a global spiritual Directive, a Council of Ministers (acting as an advisory and consultative body) people led by Mario Vega, who in turn is the senior pastor of the church in San Salvador, so practically it is the highest authority of the mission not only locally but internationally speaking.

Each church subsidiary or daughter, has at least one pastor who is the spiritual and administrative guidance of the congregation, also a council of elders who collaborates with the local pastor or leader or principal in local projects, their system of government is autonomous and each church is therefore self-financing and self-propagate. Pastors meet quarterly akin to be encouraged by the preaching of pastor accountable while cell growth obtained in these three months.

Internally each congregation to develop two types of service area: the exteriors and interiors. Those who develop the cellular system outside or outside the congregation are: supervisors, leaders, assistant leader, hosts, secretaries, treasurers, leaders of children, etc. internal servers: they develop their service during religious celebrations being deacons, deaconesses, committee support, protocol area, children's church, radio committee, etc.

== Other facts ==
On July 3, 2008, members of the church who were driving a private bus after a religious service were drifting down the river in the Salvadoran capital Acelhuate 31 people died. This fact shocked the Salvadoran society and reopened a debate about the care of the environment and the status of risk mitigation works.

In August 2008 one of the members of the council of elders elected by the National Conciliation Party of El Salvador as a presidential candidate of these in the 2009 elections. That application is not supported by the authorities the church and again puts the Elim church in the foreground in the country, but later his candidacy is withdrawn.

== See also ==
- List of the largest evangelical megachurches
