= State of Exception in El Salvador =

Government's right to temporarily suspend constitutional rights

The State of Exception is a right established in the Constitution of El Salvador. This legal framework enables the government to temporarily suspend certain constitutional rights in extraordinary circumstances. It empowers Salvadoran authorities to implement special measures when situations significantly disrupt public order or threaten national stability.

The State of Exception can be declared in various scenarios that compromise institutional normalcy, such as natural disasters, epidemics, or severe political or civil conflicts that hinder the regular functioning of institutions. Its application may cover the entire national territory or only the directly affected areas, with the aim of restoring order and ensuring citizen safety.

== Background ==
On March 26, 2022, a total of 62 violent deaths were recorded, marking the highest number of homicides in a single day in three decades in El Salvador. In response to this crisis, President Nayib Bukele's administration requested the declaration of a 30-day State of Exception. This measure was justified by the significant increase in the national homicide rate and aimed to implement extraordinary actions to counteract the violence.

I request the Legislative Assembly of El Salvador to decree a State of Exception today, in accordance with Article 29 of the Constitution of the Republic.

— Nayib Bukele on his X account

== Implementation ==
On March 27, 2022, the Legislative Assembly of El Salvador approved a state of exception in accordance with Article 29 of the Constitution of the Republic.

Art. 29.— State of Exception: In cases of war, invasion of territory, rebellion, sedition, catastrophe, epidemic, or other general calamity, or serious disturbances of public order, the guarantees established in Articles 5, 6 first paragraph, 7 first paragraph, and 24 of this Constitution may be suspended, except when it concerns meetings or associations for religious, cultural, economic, or sports purposes. Such suspension may affect all or part of the territory of the Republic and shall be enacted through a decree by the Legislative Branch or the Executive Branch, as applicable.

— Constitution of the Republic of El Salvador of 1983

This constitutional provision regulates the mechanisms through which the State can implement extraordinary measures in specific circumstances that warrant the temporary suspension of certain fundamental rights. The state of exception represents a legal instrument provided for within El Salvador’s legal framework for situations requiring specific state intervention.

Art. 2.— A "State of Exception" is declared throughout the national territory, arising from the serious disturbances to public order caused by criminal groups that threaten the life, peace, and security of the Salvadoran population.

— Decree No. 333 - Legislative Assembly of the Republic of El Salvador.

As of December 17, 2024, the Legislative Assembly of El Salvador had approved the extension of the state of exception for the thirty-third time. The measure was supported by 57 votes out of the 60 deputies that make up the legislative body.

The extension request submitted by the Council of Ministers highlighted that, since the implementation of the state of exception, more than 83,600 arrests have been made of individuals linked to gang criminal structures. At the same time, the presidency is evaluating the possibility of modifying some of the current restrictions, although the Minister of Security, Gustavo Villatoro, stated that the decision is still under analysis.

== Effects and results ==
At the end of March 2022, Salvadoran security forces announced that they had arrested 576 gang members; since the declaration of the state of exception, more than 83,000 individuals linked to gang structures have been arrested, including gang leaders.

As of December 9, 2024, the Bukele government claimed that it has totaled 776 non-consecutive days without homicides.
