= San José Guayabal =

- District
- Location in El Salvador
- Coordinates: 13°51′N 89°6′W
- Country: El Salvador
- Department: Cuscatlán
- Municipality: Cuscatlán Norte
- Elevation: 1,722 ft (525 m)

Population (2024)
  - District: 14,032
  - Rank: 97th in El Salvador
  - Urban: 4,363
  - Rural: 9,669

San José Guayabal is a district in the Cuscatlán Department of El Salvador.
