= Education in El Salvador =

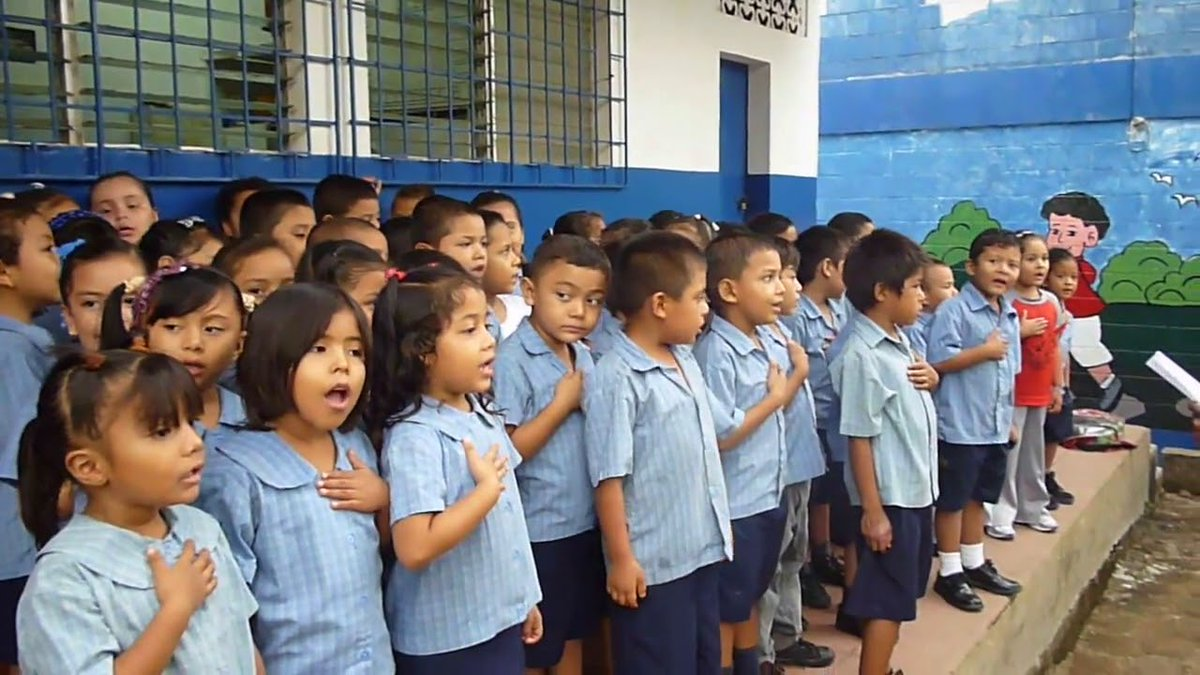
Students in El Salvador

Education in El Salvador is regulated by the country's Ministry of Education. El Salvador consists of the following levels of education:

- Basic Education divided into three cycles of three grades each:
  - 1st Cycle: from 1st to 3rd grades
  - 2nd Cycle: from 4th to 6th grades
  - 3rd Cycle: from 7th to 9th grades; which is a transition to secondary education (e.g. specialized teachers for each assignment).
- Secondary school, called Bachillerato:
  - Two year General High School
  - Three year Technical High School (e.g. Accounting, Secretariat, Electronics and Computer Science, etc.)
- Five years (minimum) of Higher Education, consisting of university education or other tertiary education.

Almost all students, public and private, take the PAES test during their second year of bachillerato. PAES is a learning aptitude test that acts as an indicator of their achievement. Students are tested on mathematics, language and literature, natural sciences, and social studies.

The Human Rights Measurement Initiative (HRMI) finds that El Salvador is fulfilling only 64.8% of what it should be for the right to education based on the country's level of income. HRMI breaks down the right to education by looking at the rights to both primary education and secondary education. While taking into consideration El Salvador's income level, the nation is achieving 64.5% of what could be possible based on its resources (income) for primary education and 65.2% for secondary education.

== Education Resources ==
As a result of wealth inequality, education is not universally accessible amongst Salvadorans as rural areas face higher rates of poverty. For example, the illiteracy rate in rural El Salvador was nearly 50% in the late 20th century. There is also an evident disparity when looking at global rankings, El Salvador repeatedly scores low in education quality and accessibility. According to statistics, only 82% of children make it to 9th grade. Of those children who have completed 9th grade and are eligible to attend secondary school, only 33% do. Across the country, the distribution of literacy is 79% for men and 73% for women.

While according to the El Salvador Constitution (1983), starting at the age of 4 years old, every child is entitled to free education. However, since most families live on less than 8.75 Colón, equivalent to 1 US dollar, often children under the age of 7 drop out of school to support their parents by working. About 1.8 million minors between the ages of 5 and 17 work. In rural areas, about 62% of all children work, to support their families.

Within more recent years the government of El Salvador had begun to bring more STEM program into school around the national, funded by minister of education and El Salvador Aerospace Institute (ESAI).

Within the El Salvador classroom, resources are limited. For instance, public school classrooms often reach more than forty students per one classroom teacher. A a result families are reluctant to send their children to public schools. Additionally, rural areas are more likely to be understaffed and under-resourced. As a result of the lack of education in El Salvador, citizens are limited in their access to opportunities, world perspective, and social and political participation.

== Curriculum ==
In El Salvador the academic year begins January and ends in November. The curriculum is divided into three specific levels: Early Childhood Education, Basic Education, and Secondary Education. Early Childhood Education is the designated level for preschool aged children. In this level of education, the focus is on child development and adjusting to different school environments. In this stage, children learn how to socialize and be a member of the classroom community. Furthermore, children at this age develop their motor, communication, and language skills.

Following Preschool Education, is Basic Education which consists of three cycles of three grades each. The first cycle is designated for 1st to 3rd graders. In this cycle, students develop their basic literacy and math skills as well as learn about basic social and ethical values. The second cycle of the Basic Education level is designed for 4th to 6th graders. In this cycle, children are introduced to new subjects such as history, science, government and geography. Additionally, students at this age begin to develop their writing skills Lastly the third cycle is from 7th to 9th grades; which is a transition to secondary education (e.g. specialized teachers for each assignment). 56% of El Salvadiorian students are enrolled in Basic Education.

Following Basic Education, there is two or an optional three years technical program of Middle Education, called bachillerato which consists of: two year General High School or Three year Technical High School (e.g. Accounting, Secretariat, Electronics and Computer Science, etc.)

Following Middle Education, Higher Education consists of five years (minimum), consisting of university education or other tertiary education. The University of El Salvador (UES) is the largest (and only) public university in the country. However, classes are constantly stopped for protests. The University of El Salvador has one main campus in San Salvador and three more campuses in Santa Ana, San Miguel and San Vicente. Also, there are many private universities as alternatives to UES.

In December 2014, the government of El Salvador entered into partnership with the United States Agency for International Development, in hopes of improving institutions of higher learning within the country with updated curricula and faculty training. The curriculum of schools in El Salvador is strictly set by MINED. The General Education Law of 1996, put forth by MINED, established a national curriculum that applies to both public and private institutions. However, this law did state that teachers could make modifications that they saw as "necessary". The same general curriculum is used in schools today, but in 2007, the curriculum was extended to a competencies approach. This approach was derived from Spain and simply ensured the completion of simple and complex tasks in a determined context. Moreover, since the decentralization of the education system in 2007, schools have been encouraged to adopt their own curricula to build a unique school identity. Overall, there has been little change to the curriculum since 1996, but topics such as sex education, child safety, gender and human rights have been integrated into school systems all throughout the country. The main reason the curriculum has not had any drastic changes since the 1990s is because of the lack of resources available in schools. For example, many of the rural school districts do not have access to the state-provided textbooks. This forces teachers to improvise and stray away from the state mandated curriculum.

== Teachers ==
Teachers in El Salvador, while generally well trained, are affected by the struggles of the education system. In 2018, it was reported by The World Bank that 95 percent of primary school teachers were sufficiently trained. Moreover, El Salvador requires that teachers attain at least a Bachelor's Degree in Education and a teaching license from MINED. MINED also requires that teachers attend professional development courses to strengthen their teaching skills and to learn new teaching methods. However, due to the country's lack of investment in education, teachers are forced to deal with things such as lack of resources and poor infrastructure (especially in rural settings). As of 2021, education makes up approximately 18 percent of the country's total spending. While this number may seem insignificant, it does represent a steady increase in annual spending. In 2020, education only made up 13 percent of the country's annual budget. This increase in spending may be an indication that the Salvadoran Government is continuing their trend of emphasizing the education system. Furthermore, this increase in spending represents the public desire of increasing teacher's salaries and providing them with more effective resources.

In El Salvador, teachers make roughly 43,000 Colón, equivalent to 4,900 US dollars, per year. Much like in the United States, this places teachers in the middle class of society. Also like the United States, this disincentives people to become educators. Furthermore, the people who do decide to become educators do not want to invest their hard-earned money in materials and resources for their classrooms. Due to the relatively low wages and fear for job security, teacher unions were founded in El Salvador during the 1960's and 70's. In fact, in February 2022, over 20 teachers' unions protested in San Salvador. The protest was centered around pension reform, wages and healthcare coverage.

== Effects of crime on education ==
El Salvador has had an incredibly high crime rate since the end of their civil war, with San Salvador being the seventh most violent city in the world and a homicide rate of 100 per 100,000 people. The high level of gang violence contributes heavily to the homicide rate. Per 100,000 people, there are about 323 gang members in El Salvador. Crime in El Salvador is committed by a majority of young men in gangs, usually kids around the age of 12-24. Poverty is a high contributor to gang involvement from kids along with a lack of education.

Gang recruitment of young kids has a strong impact on the educational development of other kids in El Salvador. The violence has an effect on the potential of families and the government to want to invest in education in El Salvador. Education funding won't come if the public assumes students will drop out and join gangs. Violence has a direct effect on how students are viewing their education. There is a negative correlation between public school and homicide rates while those who attend private school are supposedly safer. The enrollment rates in schools drop from 94.7% to 50.4% for males in the 15-22 age range. The chance of kids staying in school is largely dependent on their parents wealth status and if they are able to afford private school. Older students are less likely to be involved with education because of labor market demand and El Salvador's public education accessibility with secondary schools.

Crime also impacts the enrollment number among older students. This is due to victimization risks across different age groups. The Institute of Legal Medicine of El Salvador found that 37.2% of homicide victims in 2010 were 15 to 24 years old, while only 2.1% of the victims were younger than 15 years old. The victimization risk of this particular age group is consistent with the increase in dropouts among older students. In addition to fear of becoming targets of violence, students who dropout of school earlier on due to lack of interest or having to work for their families, are more likely to partake in violence.

== Education and poverty ==
El Salvador has high poverty rates with about 40% of the population living below the poverty line. The average income in El Salvador is approximately $851.

Poverty impacts the community greatly in terms of education and knowledge. Poorer communities in El Salvador have less access to education and especially, high-quality education. It has been found that only seven percent of El Salvadoran university students come from the poorest 40% of the households whereas 57% of students come from the richest 20% of households. Although almost half of the population is living in poverty, it represents a very small percentage of university students. This gap in education for poorer citizens exacerbates inequalities and demonstrates the country's overall lack of social mobility. This disparity also speaks to the nation's distribution of access to knowledge and skills, ultimately a symptom of El Salvador's poverty crisis.

Like in many Latin American countries, El Salvador's unequal distribution of income is reflected in the accessibility of knowledge and skills. Children who come from wealthier families have more opportunities to learn and attend better schools. Those who are poor or live in rural areas have more limited educational opportunities. Because of the poorer accessible education, they are often uninterested in school leading to failure. Even when children have access to free education, they are not always able to reap the benefits. For instance, sometimes children have to stay home to help their families bring in money. The poor and rural populations of El Salvador have been deprived of many opportunities, dating back to the oligarchies and their exploitation of these communities for cheap labor.

The government of El Salvador has failed to provide equal educational opportunities and often prioritizes higher education for the richer population. This not only discourages children of poorer families to keep attending school but also strengthens the inequalities. Although little progress has been made, there have been some educational reforms put in place to decentralize and privatize education. By decentralizing responsibilities within the government and increasing the private sector's contribution, there would be more flexibility and efficiency in the education system. There was a movement to mobilize and encourage non-governmental organizations, parents and other private agents to get involved in educational plans. In 1991, the EDUCO, Community-Managed Education Program, was created in attempt to expand access to education.

== EDUCO: Community-Managed Education Program ==
The EDUCO Program, a reform initiative, was created as a strategy to grow access to preschool and basic educational opportunities in poor isolated rural areas. Additional objectives were to improve school performance and reduce the levels of early school desertion, absenteeism, and grade repetition. EDUCO was designed to recreate the schools in peasant communities that were separate from the state. There is oversight from the government, but generally holds the role of the primary financier. This created a self-managed private form of education that encourages community participation and input.

EDUCO had a big effect on the amount of children choosing stay in school past the first cycle. There is a greater possibility that students stay in EDUCO schools because of the involvement of parents and community members. Parents and teachers are given the freedom to be more interactive which allows for more open conversation about productive learning. The program primarily focuses on the first cycle while neglecting to include the second cycle in their efforts, essentially prolonging a departure from education. The ten year education plan expanded EDUCO schools into the second cycle which increased the number from 38.6% to 52.3%.

There is variation amongst the EDUCO schools themselves. Some programs require additional funds because of a program's implementation of a tuition fee or uniforms, which isn't necessarily allowed, but can be agreed upon within the community. The need for additional funds stems from the environment and the capacity of the program. The struggling schools often look for help from non-profits, other schools, and the local community. The community participation of EDUCO partially depends on the occupation of the parents and how they interact with others. Despite the program's success with school enrollment, the quality of the education still hinders on the investment of the parents and its impact towards bringing in resources.

To the outside world, EDUCO is seen as a success, often used as an example of an effective education implementation program. It was highlighted by the World Bank in their World Development Report publication in 2004. Several other developing countries have followed EDUCO's footsteps and embraced the decentralized approach to education.

== Developments and improvements ==
Improvements in accessibility and quality of education in El Salvador are visible. Since starting in 1991, EDUCO has established five offices: La Libertad, La Paz, San Vicente, Usulután, and Morazán. These offices work to increase the outreach and support for children and schools across the country. EDUCO has improved the infrastructure of over 300 schools in the country and sent more than 7,000 packages of teaching material to schools across the country. In addition to this, more than 50,000 students have received medical care from the organization. Coupled with EDUCO's support, educational spending has increased 5.04% from 2020 to 2021. This is the first time that government spending for education has had an upward trend since 2014.

In 2021, the literacy rate of the population (for those over 10 years old) was 90%.This is a slight decline from 2020, when the literacy rate was 90.4%. Other than this, the literacy rate has been steadily increasing since 2014.

In March 2020, The World Bank approved the "Growing Up and Learning Together: Comprehensive Early Childhood Development in El Salvador" project. This initiative works towards improving the professional development of teachers working in early childhood care, physically revitalizing early childhood schools, and improving the management of the educational sector. The program is projected to cost 250 million dollars and is expected to be completed in June 2026.
