= 2026 South Ossetian presidential election =

- 18 September 2026
- Turnout: 82.65% (▲8.68 pp)

| Nominee | Marat Kambolov | Murat Valiyev |
| Party | Independent | PAY |
| Popular vote | 27,922 | 1,257 |
| Percentage | 86.97% | 3.92% |
President before election
Marat Kambolov (acting)
Independent
Elected President
Marat Kambolov
Independent

Early presidential elections were held in the disputed territory (Note: All but four UN members recognize Abkhazia and South Ossetia as part of Georgia under illegal occupation by Russian forces.) of South Ossetia on 18 September 2026. The election was called following the resignation of President Alan Gagloyev, who stepped down on 23 June 2026 to accept an advisor position under Russian president Vladimir Putin. A month prior, Gagloyev had signed a cooperation treaty with Russia that allowed Russian citizens to hold office in South Ossetia. As the president had resigned early, the 55th article of the constitution mandated that elections must be held no later than 90 days following the resignation of the president. The final turnout of the election was reported to be 82.65%.

Similar to previous elections in South Ossetia, the election had the characteristics of a managed democracy and the consolidation of state support behind a favoured candidate. The European Union refused to recognise the election as legitimate, stating that the process was a continuation of steps toward a future Russian annexation of South Ossetia. Georgia also similarly condemned the election as illegal, stating that the electoral process violated international law by intruding on Georgia's territorial integrity. Authorities in South Ossetia sent designated journalists to cover the election, while also utilizing multiple Russophile bloggers as election observers.

The election was also marked by the rapid rise of Marat Kambolov, who became acting president in the aftermath of Gagloyev's resignation on 23 June after having been recently appointed prime minister by the South Ossetian Parliament on 16 June. Kambolov became president-elect of South Ossetia on 19 September after the CEC declared that he won at least 85% of the vote. During the registration period, Kambolov was backed by Putin and received endorsements from both the sitting government and the opposition.

The only serious challenger to Kambolov, Ira Farn leader Hoh Chochiev, was rejected from the ballot on the grounds of not being fluent in Russian and his signature sheets being illegal. Chochiev criticised Kambolov's candidacy in response, stating that Kambolov did not meet the 10-year residency requirement for candidates running for the presidency of South Ossetia. Iron leader Georgiy Kabisov was unable to run due to being a convicted felon and endorsed Eduard Gabarayev, who was also rejected from the ballot by the CEC for discrepancies in personal information. Development Party candidate Fatima Khugayeva, the only female candidate, was rejected for her nominating committee being lower than the minimum 100 members requirement. In addition to Kambolov, Unity leader Zurab Kokoyev, along with former KGB officer Kazbek Kodoyev and Patriots of Alanya candidate Murat Valiyev, were also registered for the ballot.

The campaign was more defined by televised debates, as no campaign banners were present during the campaign period. In the first debate about social policy on 28 August, technical difficulties involving interrupting sounds and freezing images were observed. These technical difficulties relating to outdated equipment in the first debate caused Kambolov to skip the second debate about economic policy that was held on 8 September. The third debate on 11 September about security policy was only attended by Kodoyev. By the fourth debate between Valiev and Kodoyev, the debates had reduced interest and increased unpopularity, with views of the debate being low. Notable campaign issues included brain drain, demand for higher wages, border queues, environmental policies, and lack of public transportation.

== Background ==
The build-up to the 2024 parliamentary election was viewed by observers as preparation work for Presidential runs as the office of President holds most of the political power in South Ossetia. This consisted of both the consolidation and creation of new political parties, in order to gain a national presence before the Presidential election. Radio Free Europe reported that the merger of Dzambolat Tedeev's Patriots of Alania into the People's Party was in preparation for Tedeev to become the party's Presidential nominee. This merger would fall apart after the party failed to significantly increase its vote share in the parliamentary election. On March 15, 2024, Tedeev criticized the 10-year residency qualification for candidates to hold the office of President stating it makes North Ossetians feel ostracized from "their native land" and urged for a constitutional amendment to remove the requirement as it prevents him from pursuing the office.

Beginning in 2025 there had been speculation that then incumbent President Alan Gagloyev would not complete his term due to mounting corruption scandals, mostly centered around Russian financial aid disappearing into construction companies owned by Gagloyev and his Prime Minister Konstantin Dzhussoev's friends and families, let alone stand for re-election. Gagloyev would sack Dzhussoev and his cabinet on January 21, 2026. Elements within Gagloyev's own Nykhaz party began exploring alternative candidates such as Nelli Gogicheva, the editor-in-chief of the state-owned magazine Fidiuæg who initially announced her candidacy before quickly withdrawing it just hours later citing pressure from "destructive forces."

On May 25, 2026, Gagloyev signed a friendship treaty with Russia that allows any Russian citizen to run for and hold public office in South Ossetia. The next day the Russian newspaper Kommersant reported that the relatively unknown North Ossetian director of the Kurchatov Institute, Marat Kambolov, was Putin's top choice to become the new President of South Ossetia. On May 27 Gagloyev would name Kambolov his adviser on 'the implementation of the integration deal between South Ossetia and Russia. On 8 June 2026 Dzhussoev's successor Dzambolyt Tadtayev resigned and with Gagloyev's endorsement Kambolov was named Prime Minister on 16 June by the South Ossetian Parliament. Gagloyev resigned as President on 23 June, with Kambolov becoming acting President until snap elections could be held within 90 days.

== Campaign ==
Three of the four parties in Parliament—Nykhas, United Ossetia, and the Communist Party of South Ossetia—endorsed Kambolov, while the People's Party did not put forward or endorse a candidate; this left Kambolov as the only major candidate. Six candidates, either independents or representing minor extra-parliamentary parties, applied to run against Kambolov. Kambolov has vowed to undo allowing ethnic Georgians transit through Akhalgori Municipality, which Gagloyev campaigned on and implemented, while also promising to ease off the South Ossetian policy of creeping their border fences deeper into Georgian territory. On July 13, Russian President Vladimir Putin told Kambolov "We will do everything to support you." According to the state-owned Russian Public Opinion Research Center Kambolov has a 79% approval rating in South Ossetia.

Although Kambolov himself did not meet the residency requirements to run, this had not stopped him from using it as justification for blocking the candidacy of Tedeev, a sitting member of the Parliament of North Ossetia, from running who instead announced that his freshly re-formed Patriots of Alania would be standing Murat Valiyev, an unknown former KGB agent, as a "technical candidate" to represent Tedeev in the election. Despite this, Tedeev also simultaneously urged his followers to vote for Kambolov. Valiyev ran an agrarian campaign, vowing to increasing farming subsidies and introduce a state-run advertising program for South Ossetian produce.

Supporters of former President Leonid Tibilov who are generally skeptical of annexation, and instead promote autarky, coalesced around Tibilov's former bodyguard Hoh Chochiev who was running under the Ira Farn banner with an endorsement from Irystony Nog Faltar. Chochiev had founded Ira Farn ahead of the 2024 elections, where the party won 0 seats, as a nationalist and Assianist party that advocates for Ossetian unification albeit not within Russia. Chochiev was described by regional media as Kambolov's only serious challenger. Chochiev's candidacy would be blocked by the Central Election Commission citing his lack of knowledge in the Russian language, despite his fluency in Ossetian, and that his signature sheets weren't legal. Chochiev would then denounce the election as a sham and a violation of "the trust of citizens" while highlighting Kambolov's own candidacy was illegal per the 10-year residency requirement.

Zurab Kokoyev, a former Prime Minister and the founder and longtime leader of the Unity Party, announced his intention to run despite previously backing Kambolov. He had been described as someone "whose role is largely to fill out the ballot rather than mount a serious challenge."

Fatima Khugayeva was the only female candidate. A retired lieutenant colonel in Russia's Interior Ministry born in Moscow, she was nominated by the Development Party, which primarily represents the interests of small business owners. She previously ran for the Russian Duma in the Lermontovsky constituency in 2020 for the Communists of Russia before moving to the South Ossetian village of Kvaisa. Her candidacy was rejected as her nominating committee only had 78 members, while 100 are needed.

Two members of the Iron party ran. The first was Georgiy Kabisov, the party's founder and leader, who was previously the minister of Information and Press. The other candidate was Eduard Gabarayev, a former Lt. Colonel of the Ministry of Defence who gained prominence in 2010 for translating the Ministry of Defence's charter into Ossetian. Gabarayev was not endorsed by the party, instead becoming a candidate through a citizens petition, and as such ran as an independent. Gabarayev had previously run for President in 2011, but dropped out two days before the election and endorsed Kabisov, who was also running at the time. This time, Kabisov ended his campaign early and endorsed Gabarayev; Kabisov is a felon and would have had his candidacy rejected by the Central Election Commission. Regardless, Gabarayev's candidacy was rejected by the Central Election Commission for "inconsistencies" in his personal information.

Former KGB agent Kazbek Kodoyev also ran as an independent. Kodoyev was born in St. Petersburg but moved to Tskhinvali at a young age and graduated with a degree in French Language from the North Ossetian State University before earning a masters-equivalent in Jurisprudence from the South Ossetian State University. Kodoyev also served as the rector to the South Ossetian State University on security.

Instead of campaign banners, the campaigns of Kokoyev, Kodoyev, and Valiyev were limited to television debates. Debates were conducted by the state television between late August and mid September. The first debate discussing social policies was held on 28 August with Kambolov, Kodoyev, and Valiev attending. A second debate relating to economic policies was held on 8 September, with only Kodoyev and Valiev taking part with Kambolov skipping citing his dismay with technical difficulties during the first debate. The third debate centered on security and foreign relations, which took place on 11 September, was only attended by Kodoev. The last debate happened on 16 September, which was attended by Kodoyev and Valiyev, where both candidates discussed administration and environmental policies.

== Electoral system ==
The election is held using the two-round system; a candidate would be declared the winner if they received over 50% of the vote in the first round. If no candidate passes the 50% threshold, a run-off election will be held.

According to the 48th article of the constitution, a citizen of South Ossetia running for president must be at least 35 years old, must be fluent in the state languages (Ossetian and Russian), and must have also permanently resided in South Ossetia for the last ten years. Following election, the president serves a five-year term, and the same person may renew his or her presidency for a second consecutive term.

On 25 May 2026, Russia and South Ossetia signed a treaty on deeper integration, which included a provision that any Russian citizen can hold elected office in South Ossetia, and vice versa. South Ossetia has not updated article 48 to reflect this. Regardless, North Ossetian Russian national Marat Kambolov was named the Prime Minister, and later the President, by former President Alan Gagloyev, despite not meeting these requirements.

Due to the sudden nature of the election, the terms for members of the Central Election Commission were set to expire before the election took place. However, Parliament passed a law to extend all members terms by two years to prevent this on 29 July.

== Candidates ==
The Central Election Commission (CEC) completed its procedure to register candidates on 23 August, with four registered candidates being approved for the ballot.

=== Registered ===
- Marat Kambolov (Independent), acting president and incumbent prime minister (2026–present) (Note: Does not meet the 10-year residency requirement to run for President.)
- Kazbek Kodoyev (Independent), former KGB officer
- Zurab Kokoyev (Unity), former Prime Minister, party leader
- Murat Valiyev (Patriots of Alanya), former KGB officer

=== Rejected ===
- Hoh Chochiev (Ira Farn), leader of Ira Farn party, former bodyguard of president (2012–17) Leonid Tibilov
- Eduard Gabarayev (Independent), ex-employee of the Ministry of Defence, member of Iron party
- Fatima Khugayeva (Development Party), history teacher, Russian police lieutenant colonel (retired)

=== Withdrawn ===
- Nelli Gogicheva (Nykhas), editor-in-chief of Fidiuæg
- Georgiy Kabisov (Iron), former Chairman of the State Committee of Information, Communication and Mass Media.

=== Declined ===
- Atsamaz Bibilov, MP and president of United Ossetia.
- Georgiy Kabisov, leader of Iron party
- Vladimir Kelekhsaev, leader of Unity of the People party
- Dzhambolat Tedeyev (People's Party), former Russian national wrestling team coach and deputy to the Parliament of North Ossetia

== Endorsements ==
Hoh Chochiev (Ira Farn)

Political parties

- Irystony Nog Faltar
Marat Kambolov (Independent)

Political parties

- Communist Party
- Nykhas
- United Ossetia

Members of parliament

- Dzhambolat Tedeyev (People's Party), former Russian national wrestling team coach

== Conduct ==
A day of electoral silence was observed on 17 September. A total of 75 polling stations were open on 18 September between 8:00 am and 8:00 pm MSK, with 70 stations being located in South Ossetia. The other five stations were located in Russia, with four stations operating in North Ossetia and one station operating in Moscow. Concurrently, 11 polling stations also operated in South Ossetia between 18 and 20 September for Russian citizens voting in the 2026 elections for the State Duma. 60 observers monitored the election, which included persons from Russia, Belarus, Abkhazia, and Venezuela. The South Ossetian government also had a number of independent, unqualified, observers, mostly Russophile bloggers such as Germany's Christian Wagner and Serbia's Srdjan Perisic. The CEC stated that 26,639 citizens were on the voter lists, but added that the figure was not final. The State Information Agency highlighted support for Kambolov among South Ossetians fighting in volunteer units as part of the Russian Invasion of Ukraine, stating "fascism must be defeated" and urging a final resolution to the "events of August 2008".

== Results ==
Partial results from 30 of 75 polling stations were reported by the CEC on 18 September, stating that Marat Kambolov was leading with 88.4% of the vote, while Patriots of Alanya candidate Murat Valiyev came second with 4.3% of the vote. An initial preliminary turnout of 73.2% was also declared.

Further preliminary results that were 99% reporting on 19 September later showed Kambolov winning with 85.12% of the vote, while Valiev was in second place with 3.75% of the vote. Kodoev was in third place with 2.40%, while Kokoev came last with 1.35%. Nearly five percent of all voters cast their ballot against all candidates. The preliminary turnout reported at the time was 77.91%. Official results were released later on the same day, declaring a final turnout of 82.65%.

| Candidate | Party | Votes | % |
|---|---|---|---|
| Marat Kambolov | Independent | 27,922 | 86.97 |
| Murat Valiyev | Patriots of Alanya | 1,257 | 3.92 |
| Kazbek Kodoyev | Independent | 828 | 2.58 |
| Zurab Kokoyev | Unity Party | 488 | 1.52 |
| None of the above | | 1,610 | 5.01 |
| Total | | 32,105 | 100.00 |
| Valid votes | | 32,105 | 97.68 |
| Invalid/blank votes | | 764 | 2.32 |
| Total votes | | 32,869 | 100.00 |
| Registered voters/turnout | | 39,768 | 82.65 |
Source: CIKRUO

== Aftermath ==
Following the closure of the polls, a concert and lottery were held in the city centre of Tskhinvali to celebrate the end of the election period. Some of the items that were handed out in the lottery included household appliances, phones, TVs, bicycles, vacuums, and a Niva Legend car made from Russia as a grand prize.

President-elect Marat Kambolov thanked voters for their turnout in the election, while also encouraging Russian citizens to vote in the State Duma elections that were being held concurrently. Unity candidate Zurab Kokoyev similarly noted the turnout and congratulated Kambolov on his victory. Patriots of Alanya candidate Murat Valiyev stated that the results were clear, being satisfied with the campaign while desiring a rapid consolidation of administration. Kazbek Kodoyev thanked election organisers, state bodies, and security agencies for an orderly process at the polls. Deutsche Welle described Kambolov's victory as a foregone conclusion and noted that Kambolov had, in the days leading up to the election, initiated a purge of supporters of former President Gagloyev, including the sacking of Deputy Head of the KGB Alexander Tuayev and Minister of Education Lolayev Kambolov. Marat Kambolov was sworn in as president on 30 September, while the government simultaneously resigned since Kambolov was no longer prime minister.

The European Union's High Representative Kaja Kallas stated that the outcome of the elections should be considered null and void, highlighting continued Russian attempts in consolidating further influence in South Ossetia. The Ministry of Foreign Affairs of Georgia also similarly condemned the election, stating that the polling stations held in South Ossetia were a violation of Georgia's sovereignty and territorial integrity.
