= 2024 South Ossetian parliamentary election =

- 9 June 2024
- All 34 seats in Parliament; 18 seats needed for a majority
| Party | Leader | Vote % | Seats | +/– |
|---|---|---|---|---|
| Nykhas | Zita Besayeva | 30.59 | 10 | +6 |
| United Ossetia | Alan Tadtaev | 31.75 | 7 | −7 |
| People's Party | Sergei Kharebov | 16.07 | 5 | 0 |
| HIKP | Stanislav Kochiev | 7.12 | 3 | +1 |
| Independents | – | – | 9 | +3 |
This lists parties that won seats. See the complete results below.
| Prime Minister before | Prime Minister after |
|---|---|
| Konstantin Dzhussoev; Independent | Konstantin Dzhussoev; Independent |

Parliamentary elections were held in South Ossetia (Note: All but six UN members recognize Abkhazia and South Ossetia as part of Georgia under illegal occupation by Russian forces) on 9 June 2024 to determine the composition of the South Ossetian Parliament, the legislature of the partially recognized Caucasian Republic of South Ossetia, which most of the United Nations recognizes as part of Georgia. In the 2022 presidential elections South Ossetia's opposition came to power for the first time since 2012, however, the government has been plagued by scandals.

Prior to the election, the incumbent government of South Ossetia was a minority government led by Nykhas, in coalition with the People's Party of South Ossetia and the Unity of the People party, as well as a number of independents.

Of the 34 seats in Parliament, 17 are awarded via a proportional system, where, United Ossetia, the long-time formerly ruling party of former President Anatoly Bibilov, won the most votes, at 31.75%, with Nykhaz of incumbent president Alan Gagloev coming in a close second with 30.59%, with both parties winning 6 seats. However, the other 17 seats are determined via constituencies, where Nykhaz won an additional 4 seats outright to United Ossetia's 1, putting the total seat share at 10 for Nykhaz, making them the largest party, and 7 for United Ossetia. Additionally, 3 independents that were elected announced that they would caucus with Nykhaz in Parliament, increasing their seats to 13, which, coupled with their coalition partner in the People's Party winning 5 seats, puts the governing coalition at 18 seats, the exact amount needed for a majority.

== Background ==
2024 proved to be a pivotal year in the south Caucasus, namely due to the 2023 Azerbaijani offensive in Nagorno-Karabakh resolving the longstanding Nagorno-Karabakh conflict, allowing for normalization between Russia and Turkey, meaning that there will likely be a reduction, or even removal, of Russian peacekeepers from the region altogether. Additionally, Russia has been using a softer approach regarding South Ossetia when compared to Abkhazia, hoping that this will allow for easier harmonization with the Georgian government, which has been notably more conciliatory towards Russia in recent years. Namely, Russia is seemingly supportive of a softer, less Russophilic, South Ossetia if it means a détente with the Georgian Dream-led Georgia. However, should Georgian Dream lose the October Georgian election, this would likely result in the new Georgian government to rally towards the return of control of their borders and evict Russia and their separatists from Abkhazia and South Ossetia. However, several high ranking South Ossetian officials have been in talks with the Russian government regarding the annexation of South Ossetia should Georgia dramatically move in a pro-western direction.

Alan Gagloev has been the President of South Ossetia since his election in 2022. Gagloev, president of the Nykhaz party, was a leading figure of the South Ossetian opposition, characterized for their more pragmatic approach with Russia and the support of domestic economic ventures. However, parliament remained under control of Gagloev's opposition, the South Ossetian political establishment, United Ossetia. Gagloyev is facing opposition from both the Russian government and the South Ossetian public due to Gagloyev's scandalous cabinet which has failed to resolve, and worsened, many of the republic's economic problems. However, the Russian government remains non-committal in their opposition, as Gagloyev has been supportive of South Ossetians fighting in the Russo-Ukrainian war, with by the end of 2023, hundreds of South Ossetians dying in battle there. Pundits from the Central Asia-Caucasus Institute (CACI) have speculated that Russia is going to have to make the choice to either support Gagloyev and redirect funds from the Russo-Ukrainian war to keep South Ossetia supportive of the war effort. Or oppose Gagloyev for a more traditional South Ossetian government at the cost of South Ossetia's aid in the war. Additionally, CACI speculated on a third outcome, a status quo, which would cripple the Republic until the 2027 South Ossetian presidential election and could spell total political collapse.

=== New parties ===
Since the 2019 election, and namely with Gagloev reverting many of the restrictive election laws, seven new political parties were created to compete in the 2024 election. These include:

- For Justice (Note: Pro-Eduard Kokoity) led by Harry Muldarov
- Iron led by Georgiy Kabisov
- Patriots of Alanya led by Dzambolat Tedeev (Merged into People's Party on April 6, 2024)
- Ira Farn
- Irystony nog faltar
- Development Party led by Albert Valiev
- Fydybast led by Vyacheslav Gobozov

On 6 May 2024, Gagloev reinstated many of the repressive election laws, limiting participation to just Nykhas, United Ossetia, the Communist Party, the People’s Party, Unity of the People, Ira Farn, and Unity as well as ending the ability for Ossetians abroad in Abkhazia, a United Ossetia stronghold, to vote, closing its polling station in Sokhumi citing “the impracticality of its operation.” Former allies of Gagloev, Garri Muldarov and David Sanakoyev, who founded the For Justice party, protested being excluded. Claiming that "The ruling party ‘Nykhas’ blatantly disregards the law" and that "The election campaign is conducted outside the boundaries of both law and decency."

== Results ==
| Party | Proportional | | | District | | | Total seats | +/– |
| Party | Votes | % | Seats | Votes | % | Seats | Total seats | +/– |
|---|---|---|---|---|---|---|---|---|
| United Ossetia | 6,942 | 31.75 | 6 | 2,660 | 13.70 | 1 | 7 | –7 |
| Nykhas | 6,690 | 30.59 | 6 | 2,852 | 14.69 | 4 | 10 | +6 |
| People's Party of South Ossetia | 3,514 | 16.07 | 3 | 2,345 | 12.08 | 2 | 5 | 0 |
| Communist Party of South Ossetia | 1,557 | 7.12 | 2 | 621 | 3.20 | 1 | 3 | +1 |
| Iry Farn | 1,038 | 4.75 | 0 | 195 | 1.00 | 0 | 0 | New |
| Unity of the People | 918 | 4.20 | 0 | 961 | 4.95 | 0 | 0 | –3 |
| Unity Party | 409 | 1.87 | 0 | | | 0 | 0 | 0 |
| Fatherland Socialist Party | | | | 134 | 0.69 | 0 | 0 | 0 |
| Independents | | | | 8,646 | 44.54 | 9 | 9 | +3 |
| Against all | 800 | 3.66 | – | 999 | 5.15 | – | – | – |
| Total | 21,868 | 100.00 | 17 | 19,413 | 100.00 | 17 | 34 | 0 |
| Valid votes | 21,868 | 92.41 | | 19,413 | 95.75 | | | |
| Invalid/blank votes | 1,795 | 7.59 | | 861 | 4.25 | | | |
| Total votes | 23,663 | 100.00 | | 20,274 | 100.00 | | | |
| Registered voters/turnout | 34,333 | 68.92 | | 31,603 | 64.15 | | | |
Source: (Note: Political affiliation of the candidates in single-member districts: United Ossetia: Nykhas: People's Party: Communist Party: Iry Farn: Unity of the People: Fatherland Socialist Party:)

The following candidates were elected via their respective party lists:

Nykhas:

- Zita Grigorievna Besayeva
- Alan Taimurazovich Margiev
- Alan Gennadievich Pliev
- Ruslan Dzhemalovich Khuzbezhty
- Alan Taimurazovich Tibilov
- Alan Georgievich Gabaraev

United Ossetia:

- Atsamaz Akhsarovich Bibilov
- Alan Sergeevich Tadtaev
- Vladimir Eduardovich Pukhaev
- Vasily Totradzovich Guliev
- Andrey Kazbekovich Dzudtsov
- Yuri Konstantinovich Gabaraev

People's Party:

- Sergey Vladimirovich Kharebaty
- Robert Nugzarovich Tabuev
- Alexander Mikhailovich Pliev

Communist Party:

- Taimuraz Valerievich Tadtaev
- Alan Alimbegovich Bestaev

=== By district ===
District Nº 1
| Candidate | Party | Votes | % |
|---|---|---|---|
| Ivan Kazbekovich Slanov | Independent | 456 | 27.89 |
| Igor Ivanovich Kochiev | Independent | 356 | 21.77 |
| Gennady Volodievich Tskhovrebov | United Ossetia | 345 | 21.10 |
| Ibragim Khazbievich Kelekhsaev | Unity of the People | 200 | 12.23 |
| Alexander Stanislavovich Tedeev | People's Party of South Ossetia | 110 | 6.73 |
| Vyacheslav Vladimirovich Dzhabiev | Communist Party of South Ossetia | 78 | 4.77 |
| Against all | | 90 | 5.50 |
| Total | | 1,635 | 100.00 |
| Valid votes | | 1,604 | 96.63 |
| Invalid/blank votes | | 56 | 3.37 |
| Total votes | | 1,660 | 100.00 |
| Registered voters/turnout | | 1,656 | 100.24 |

District Nº 2
| Candidate | Party | Votes | % |
|---|---|---|---|
| Oleg Ruslanovich Kozaev | Independent | 285 | 22.48 |
| Zemma Ivanovna Dzhagaeva | People's Party of South Ossetia | 208 | 16.40 |
| Anatoly Grigorievich Tadtaev | United Ossetia | 203 | 16.01 |
| Dmitry Nikolaevich Tasoev | Nykhas | 184 | 14.51 |
| Bargsag Batradzovich Pliev | Fatherland Socialist Party | 134 | 10.57 |
| Garri Alimbegovich Tsandiaty | Unity of the People | 94 | 7.41 |
| Alan Borisovich Kelekhsaev | Independent | 80 | 6.31 |
| Against all | | 80 | 6.31 |
| Total | | 1,268 | 100.00 |
| Valid votes | | 1,268 | 96.79 |
| Invalid/blank votes | | 42 | 3.21 |
| Total votes | | 1,310 | 100.00 |
| Registered voters/turnout | | 2,322 | 56.42 |

District Nº 3
| Candidate | Party | Votes | % |
|---|---|---|---|
| Alexander Vadimovich Gassiev | Independent | 415 | 34.02 |
| Feliks Fedorovich Sanakoev | United Ossetia | 269 | 22.05 |
| Alan Nikolaevich Khugaev | Independent | 190 | 15.57 |
| Lery Vladimirovich Tedeev | Independent | 150 | 12.30 |
| Zauri Zaurovich Gabaraev | Unity of the People | 64 | 5.25 |
| Against all | | 132 | 10.82 |
| Total | | 1,220 | 100.00 |
| Valid votes | | 1,220 | 98.15 |
| Invalid/blank votes | | 23 | 1.85 |
| Total votes | | 1,243 | 100.00 |
| Registered voters/turnout | | 2,640 | 47.08 |

District Nº 4
| Candidate | Party | Votes | % |
|---|---|---|---|
| Konstantin Davidovich Pliev | Independent | 246 | 21.45 |
| Lali Ruslanovna Gataeva | Nykhas | 244 | 21.27 |
| Vadim Nodarovich Tedeev | People's Party of South Ossetia | 152 | 13.25 |
| Inal Ruslanovich Pliev | Communist Party of South Ossetia | 115 | 10.03 |
| Avedik Sulikoevich Naniev | Independent | 103 | 8.98 |
| Bala Ivanovych Bestouts | Independent | 71 | 6.19 |
| Batradz Khadzhi-Muratovich Dzutstsati | Independent | 61 | 5.32 |
| Inal Vardanovich Gabaraev | Unity of the People | 60 | 5.23 |
| Alana Alanovna Gabaraeva | Independent | 26 | 2.27 |
| Against all | | 69 | 6.02 |
| Total | | 1,147 | 100.00 |
| Valid votes | | 1,147 | 94.95 |
| Invalid/blank votes | | 61 | 5.05 |
| Total votes | | 1,208 | 100.00 |
| Registered voters/turnout | | 2,268 | 53.26 |

District Nº 5
| Candidate | Party | Votes | % |
|---|---|---|---|
| Azamat Taymurazovich Dzhanaev | Independent | 347 | 33.92 |
| Alan Georgievich Vaneev | Independent | 260 | 25.42 |
| Konstantin Georgievich Kisiev | Independent | 184 | 17.99 |
| Sergey Yurievich Tadtaev | Unity of the People | 93 | 9.09 |
| Azamat Tamerlanovich Sanakoev | Iry Farn | 46 | 4.50 |
| Against all | | 93 | 9.09 |
| Total | | 1,023 | 100.00 |
| Valid votes | | 1,023 | 95.61 |
| Invalid/blank votes | | 47 | 4.39 |
| Total votes | | 1,070 | 100.00 |
| Registered voters/turnout | | 1,985 | 53.90 |

District Nº 6
| Candidate | Party | Votes | % |
|---|---|---|---|
| Malkhaz Nugzarovich Gagloev | Communist Party of South Ossetia | 257 | 30.82 |
| Taimuraz Anatolievich Zhazhiev | Independent | 235 | 28.18 |
| Anatoly Leonidovich Chekhoev | United Ossetia | 186 | 22.30 |
| Alan Tarielovich Tadtaev | Independent | 88 | 10.55 |
| Albert Albertovich Laliev | People's Party of South Ossetia | 27 | 3.24 |
| Against all | | 41 | 4.92 |
| Total | | 834 | 100.00 |
| Valid votes | | 834 | 95.53 |
| Invalid/blank votes | | 39 | 4.47 |
| Total votes | | 873 | 100.00 |
| Registered voters/turnout | | 1,390 | 62.81 |

District Nº 7
| Candidate | Party | Votes | % |
|---|---|---|---|
| Azamat Alanovich Bekoev | People's Party of South Ossetia | 166 | 17.18 |
| Alan Taymurazovich Zasseev | Nykhas | 161 | 16.67 |
| Dmitry Vladimirovich Bukulov | United Ossetia | 122 | 12.63 |
| Uruzmag Efremovich Tadtaev | Independent | 108 | 11.18 |
| Khokh Vasilievich Gussalov | Independent | 95 | 9.83 |
| Soslan Nugzarovich Dzhioev | Independent | 84 | 8.70 |
| Valery Tegaevich Kokoev | Independent | 82 | 8.49 |
| Sergey Leonidovich Bestaev | Independent | 51 | 5.28 |
| Gamlet Erastovich Gabaraev | Independent | 45 | 4.66 |
| Against all | | 52 | 5.38 |
| Total | | 966 | 100.00 |
| Valid votes | | 966 | 95.83 |
| Invalid/blank votes | | 42 | 4.17 |
| Total votes | | 1,008 | 100.00 |
| Registered voters/turnout | | 1,390 | 72.52 |

District Nº 8
| Candidate | Party | Votes | % |
|---|---|---|---|
| Alan Irbegovich Gagloev | Independent | 518 | 28.89 |
| Bola Soltanovich Kotolov | Independent | 401 | 22.36 |
| Anatoly Zakharievich Lolaev | Independent | 185 | 10.32 |
| Taymuraz Vladimirovich Dzhagaev | Independent | 156 | 8.70 |
| Soslan Vilgelmovich Khasiev | People's Party of South Ossetia | 156 | 8.70 |
| Alexander Nodarovich Alborov | Independent | 117 | 6.53 |
| Alan Ruslanovich Pliev | Independent | 110 | 6.13 |
| Inga Alexandrovna Besaeva | Communist Party of South Ossetia | 31 | 1.73 |
| Soslan Atsamazovich Bestaev | Unity of the People | 22 | 1.23 |
| Against all | | 97 | 5.41 |
| Total | | 1,793 | 100.00 |
| Valid votes | | 1,793 | 96.66 |
| Invalid/blank votes | | 62 | 3.34 |
| Total votes | | 1,855 | 100.00 |
| Registered voters/turnout | | 3,377 | 54.93 |

District Nº 9
| Candidate | Party | Votes | % |
|---|---|---|---|
| Arkady Nogzarovich Kachmazov | Nykhas | 319 | 19.21 |
| Georgiy Taymurazovich Gabaraev | Independent | 292 | 17.58 |
| Vadim Emzarovych Doguzov | Independent | 201 | 12.10 |
| Soslan Giurievich Dzhioev | People's Party of South Ossetia | 150 | 9.03 |
| Azamat Yurievich Gabaraev | Iry Farn | 115 | 6.92 |
| Vadim Petrovich Doguzov | Independent | 87 | 5.24 |
| Taymmuraz Taymurazovich Bolataev | Independent | 80 | 4.82 |
| Vladimir Vladimirovich Dzhagaev | Independent | 80 | 4.82 |
| Eduard Slavikovich Gazzaev | Independent | 59 | 3.55 |
| Feliks Fedorovich Dzagoev | Communist Party of South Ossetia | 50 | 3.01 |
| Soslan Shotaevich Tedety | Independent | 50 | 3.01 |
| Alan Georgievich Kaziev | Independent | 44 | 2.65 |
| Raul Robertovich Kochiev | Independent | 26 | 1.57 |
| Against all | | 108 | 6.50 |
| Total | | 1,661 | 100.00 |
| Valid votes | | 1,661 | 95.90 |
| Invalid/blank votes | | 71 | 4.10 |
| Total votes | | 1,732 | 100.00 |
| Registered voters/turnout | | 2,675 | 64.75 |

District Nº 10
| Candidate | Party | Votes | % |
|---|---|---|---|
| Alik Grigorievich Dzagoev | United Ossetia | 292 | 42.88 |
| Murat Nikolaevich Valiev | Independent | 115 | 16.89 |
| Valery Yurievich Bekoev | Nykhas | 80 | 11.75 |
| Andrey Soslanovich Kulukhov | People's Party of South Ossetia | 80 | 11.75 |
| Alim Zakharovich Kochiev | Independent | 59 | 8.66 |
| Against all | | 55 | 8.08 |
| Total | | 681 | 100.00 |
| Valid votes | | 681 | 91.90 |
| Invalid/blank votes | | 60 | 8.10 |
| Total votes | | 741 | 100.00 |
| Registered voters/turnout | | 2,163 | 34.26 |

District Nº 11
| Candidate | Party | Votes | % |
|---|---|---|---|
| Arsen Aslanovich Kvezerov | People's Party of South Ossetia | 548 | 54.31 |
| Alan Andreevich Tuaev | United Ossetia | 306 | 30.33 |
| Alan Aleksandrovich Khachirov | Unity of the People | 112 | 11.10 |
| Against all | | 43 | 4.26 |
| Total | | 1,009 | 100.00 |
| Valid votes | | 1,009 | 95.28 |
| Invalid/blank votes | | 50 | 4.72 |
| Total votes | | 1,059 | 100.00 |
| Registered voters/turnout | | 1,693 | 62.55 |

District Nº 12
| Candidate | Party | Votes | % |
|---|---|---|---|
| Ibragim Guramovich Kharebov | Nykhas | 528 | 36.31 |
| Tamerlan Valerianovich Tskhovrebov | People's Party of South Ossetia | 263 | 18.09 |
| Vladimir Stepanovich Kelekhsaev | Unity of the People | 258 | 17.74 |
| Ruslan Pavlovich Khudzhiev | Independent | 176 | 12.10 |
| Alexander Aleksandrovich Elbakiev | Independent | 96 | 6.60 |
| Totrbeg Yasonovich Tibilov | Independent | 42 | 2.89 |
| Taimuraz Valerievich Parastaev | Independent | 36 | 2.48 |
| Eduard Valerievich Karsanov | Independent | 32 | 2.20 |
| Against all | | 23 | 1.58 |
| Total | | 1,454 | 100.00 |
| Valid votes | | 1,454 | 96.42 |
| Invalid/blank votes | | 54 | 3.58 |
| Total votes | | 1,508 | 100.00 |
| Registered voters/turnout | | 1,900 | 79.37 |

District Nº 13
| Candidate | Party | Votes | % |
|---|---|---|---|
| Alan Ruslanovich Khugaev | Independent | 616 | 51.81 |
| Vadim Gelaevich Bazayev | United Ossetia | 304 | 25.57 |
| Sarmat Mukharovich Bitiev | People's Party of South Ossetia | 193 | 16.23 |
| Tatyana Yurevna Gagieva | Communist Party of South Ossetia | 35 | 2.94 |
| Rostislav Tembolovich Dzhioev | Independent | 28 | 2.35 |
| Against all | | 13 | 1.09 |
| Total | | 1,189 | 100.00 |
| Valid votes | | 1,189 | 96.59 |
| Invalid/blank votes | | 42 | 3.41 |
| Total votes | | 1,231 | 100.00 |
| Registered voters/turnout | | 1,388 | 88.69 |

District Nº 14
| Candidate | Party | Votes | % |
|---|---|---|---|
| Andrey Zakharievich Bagaev | Nykhas | 498 | 46.46 |
| Oleg Lavrentievich Siukaev | United Ossetia | 243 | 22.67 |
| Marat Tigranovich Gagiev | Independent | 159 | 14.83 |
| Rodion Shalvovich Siukaev | People's Party of South Ossetia | 59 | 5.50 |
| Dzhemal Mikhailovich Kozaev | Communist Party of South Ossetia | 55 | 5.13 |
| Vitaly Sulikoevich Pliev | Iry Farn | 34 | 3.17 |
| Against all | | 24 | 2.24 |
| Total | | 1,072 | 100.00 |
| Valid votes | | 1,072 | 95.37 |
| Invalid/blank votes | | 52 | 4.63 |
| Total votes | | 1,124 | 100.00 |
| Registered voters/turnout | | 1,743 | 64.49 |

District Nº 15
| Candidate | Party | Votes | % |
|---|---|---|---|
| Soslan Guramovich Gagiev | Independent | 259 | 29.20 |
| Dmitry Khsarbegovich Kotaev | United Ossetia | 188 | 21.20 |
| Vitaly Kazbekovich Kozaev | Independent | 168 | 18.94 |
| Gemir Gennadievich Tedeev | Independent | 89 | 10.03 |
| Villiam Mamedovich Bestayev | People's Party of South Ossetia | 80 | 9.02 |
| Azamat Soslanovich Sobaev | Nykhas | 51 | 5.75 |
| Against all | | 52 | 5.86 |
| Total | | 887 | 100.00 |
| Valid votes | | 887 | 92.40 |
| Invalid/blank votes | | 73 | 7.60 |
| Total votes | | 960 | 100.00 |
| Registered voters/turnout | | 1,149 | 83.55 |

District Nº 16
| Candidate | Party | Votes | % |
|---|---|---|---|
| Zaza Nodarovich Driaev | Nykhas | 787 | 81.30 |
| David Konstantinovich Kusraev | Independent | 121 | 12.50 |
| Dzhulia Soslanovna Babutsidze | Unity of the People | 39 | 4.03 |
| Against all | | 21 | 2.17 |
| Total | | 968 | 100.00 |
| Valid votes | | 968 | 93.44 |
| Invalid/blank votes | | 68 | 6.56 |
| Total votes | | 1,036 | 100.00 |
| Registered voters/turnout | | 1,052 | 98.48 |

District Nº 17
| Candidate | Party | Votes | % |
|---|---|---|---|
| Eldar Nodarovich Akhmedov | Independent | 226 | 37.29 |
| Ilya Frangelovich Khubulov | United Ossetia | 202 | 33.33 |
| Nikolay Zaurbekovich Bestaev | People's Party of South Ossetia | 153 | 25.25 |
| Tinatin Sulkhanovna Khubulova | Unity of the People | 19 | 3.14 |
| Against all | | 6 | 0.99 |
| Total | | 606 | 100.00 |
| Valid votes | | 606 | 96.96 |
| Invalid/blank votes | | 19 | 3.04 |
| Total votes | | 625 | 100.00 |
| Registered voters/turnout | | 812 | 76.97 |

== Aftermath ==
After the preliminary results were released Nykhas declared a "decisive" victory in the election, claiming a parliamentary majority. Nykhas was largely supported in the rural countryside, while United Ossetia saw its support from South Ossetia's urban core of Tskhinvali.

During the election, supporters of United Ossetia posted to Telegram claiming fraud, stating that voting stations in United Ossetia strongholds were outfitted with disappearing ink. This, combined with the Central Election Commission (CEC) widely changing the reported vote share several times during the counting exasperated issues; initially United Ossetia was reported to have won 45.67% to Nykhas' 29.59%, before changing the report to say United Ossetia won 32% to Nykhas' 29.93%, while Nykhas has maintained it received 31.17%. United Ossetia's leadership from the front steps of their headquarters demanded that the results from the Vladikavkaz polling station, where supporters claimed disappearing ink pens were used, be nullified and rejected by the CEC, otherwise they would reject the election, and any subsequent government, as legitimate. CEC head Emilia Gagieva refused the demands. On 13 June 2024, the State Information Agency issued a statement from the CEC where they reported that the CEC took the accusations seriously and launched a comprehensive investigation into the allegations of fraud that United Ossetia levied, but that the investigation showed no signs of foul play.

Both the Communist Party and the Ira Farn Party denounced calls for a violent overthrow of the Nykhaz regime, urging for calm and for all parties to observe order and not provoke new crises. Caucasian Knot, interviewing a number of locals and political scientists, concluded that the results of the election were genuine, and that United Ossetia had simply underestimated the power of the rural voter that Nykhaz has centered its regime on.

With the results there is only one opposition party in South Ossetia, United Ossetia, with the People's Party retaining their spot in the governing coalition, and with the Communist Party continuing their policy of supporting the President, regardless of their political affiliation. Nykhas also saw a large overturn in its MPs, with most of the party list being newcomers loyal to Gagloev’s circle. This includes Alan Margiev, Gagloev’s head of the presidential administration, Alan Pliev, Gagloev’s presidential aide, and Ruslan Khubezov, the chairman of Nykhas' committee for youth policy and sports. Additional Nykhas member district representatives are almost exclusively newcomers.

Following the CEC's refusal to investigate their allegations of voter fraud, United Ossetia boycotted the opening of Parliament, at which, Alan Margiev was named the Speaker, and the three vice speaker positions went to Nykhaz's chairwoman Zita Besayeva, and the chairmen of the People's Party and the Communists respectively. Despite this, the CEC's chairwoman refused to certify the results of the election, and held a recount, which saw the Communists drop below the 7% threshold to enter parliament, but where still awarded two seats (one from district results, and the other being the vice speaker since he was already sworn in), while both Nykhaz and United Ossetia had their mandates drop from 7 seats to 6 each. United Osstia continued to claim fraud, claiming that there were only 500 registered voters in the Leningor district but over 700 voted, and accused Nykhaz of being Kartvelophiles, and alleged they bussed in Georgians to vote in the election there. United Ossetia also claimed that four polling stations in Tskhinvali, their stronghold, reported a 0% turnout. The CEC also stated that they issued 20,033 ballots, but received 22,983.

=== Georgian thaw ===
Following the declaration of victory by Georgian Dream in the 2024 Georgian parliamentary election and its increasing Russophilic positions, the situation in South Ossetia has been described by the Carnegie Endowment as "Present[ing] Moscow With a Difficult Choice." One of the positions that Georgian Dream has taken is that now that they have warmed relations with Russia, that they can reincorporate South Ossetia and Abkhazia with Russian permission.

Sergei Prikhodko had previously outlined a series of steps the Georgian government would need to take to have Russia's blessing to reincorporate the territory as: "The Georgian government changes. That the new leadership designates Saakashvili a war criminal, jails him, and admits that Tbilisi’s actions in August 2008 were a mistake, perhaps even criminal. Then this new government shows it’s ready to turn away from the West toward Russia, return to the Commonwealth of Independent States, reject accession to NATO and even the European Union, instead joining the Collective Security Treaty Organization." To this end, since he made these comments the Georgian Government has changed, Saakashvili has been arrested, and Georgian Dream has "postponed" further negotiations with the EU until 2027 and Georgian Dream leader Bidzina Ivanishvili promised to investigate Saakashvili and other Georgian officials for war crimes due to the 2008 war.

However, this has worried the local politicians and figures from South Ossetia and Abkhazia, who worry about the elimination of their special political status should Russia resign their independence to Georgia. Irakli Kobakhidze claimed by 2030 South Ossetia and Abkhazia would be reintegrated into Georgia. Should this be the case Russia would lose its ability to project power in the Caucasus, towards Turkey, and therefore the only reason they'd permit Georgia to retake control of the territories is if Georgia becomes a staunch Russian ally and allows Russia to station troops within their borders.

Additionally, during the protests due to the 2024–2025 Georgian constitutional crisis South Ossetia cooperated with Georgian authorities and crossed the Georgian-South Ossetian border and arrested two anti-Georgian Dream protesters in Kvemo Nikozi, holding them in a prison in Tskhinvali, for attempting to "organize a channel for the illegal transfer across the South Ossetian-Georgian border of Vladimir Anzorovich Mamardashvili, a serviceman of the Ministry of Defense of the Russian Federation born in 1999, who had deserted from the zone of special military operation.”

== Reactions ==
- Abkhazia: Deputy Chairman of the People's Assembly – Parliament of the Republic of Abkhazia Committee on International, Inter-parliamentary Relations and Relations with Compatriots "The elections are being held within the framework of the law, no any violations have been identified. There is very high organization at the polling stations. Falsifications and any manipulations are impossible, because observers from each party are represented at the polling stations, each of whom signs on the back of the ballots. Everything is very transparent".
- South Ossetia: Patrick Poppel, an Austrian Russophile who is currently employed for the South Ossetian foreign ministry, stated that the elections should be "an example for other countries." Denouncing the Austrian election system for its lack of electable political independents, and praising South Ossetia for the inverse. He also stated that "Western democracy is just bombs and missiles" and denounced "Western Culture."
- Azerbaijan: MFA of Azerbaijan "reaffirms its support for Georgia’s sovereignty and territorial integrity and does not recognize the so-called “parliamentary elections”
- Estonia: MFA of Estonia "condemns the illegitimate parliamentary elections in Georgia’s South Ossetia region."
- Georgia: Ministry of Foreign Affairs of Georgia condemned "so called elections", stated that it "blatantly violates the sovereignty and territorial integrity of Georgia within its internationally recognized borders."
- Iceland: MFA of Iceland "unequivocally condemns the sham "parliamentary elections" in Georgia’s occupied South Ossetia" and that “Russia must live up to its obligations under the 2008 cease-fire agreement, withdraw its occupation forces from Georgia and respect its sovereignty and territorial integrity.”
- Japan: The Embassy of Japan in Georgia issued a statement that "Japan does not recognize legitimacy of the so-called parliamentary elections held in Tskhinvali region/South Ossetia on June 9" and that "Japan opposes any attempt to change the internationally recognized borders of Georgia."
- Latvia: MFA of Latvia stated that "Latvia condemns and does not recognize holding of the so-called parliamentary elections under Russia’s occupation on 9 June in Georgia’s region of South Ossetia. Latvia strongly supports Georgia’s territorial integrity and sovereignty within its internationally recognised border".
- Lithuania: Ministry of Foreign Affairs of Lithuania published the statement of Minister Gabrielius Landsbergis who "condemns the so-called "parliamentary elections" in occupied Georgia's Tskhinvali region"
- Sweden: MFA of Sweden "does not recognize the so-called ‘parliamentary elections’ held in the Georgian region of South Ossetia on 9 June. Sweden fully supports Georgia’s sovereignty and territorial integrity."
- United Kingdom: Embassy of UK in Georgia stated that UK doesn't recognize legitimacy of "so called" elections and continues to support Georgia's territorial integrity and sovereignty within its internationally recognized border.
- United States: Assistant of the Secretary of State Department Jim O'Brien stated that "The United States condemns and will not recognize sham parliamentary elections in Russia-occupied South Ossetia being conducted without Georgia's consent. We fully support Georgia's territorial integrity and sovereignty within its internationally recognized borders."
- Russia: The Ministry of Foreign Affairs of Russia announced that the elections were held in "strict accordance" with national electoral legislation. They also stated that the election was a step towards strengthening South Ossetia's democratic institutions and statehood, and hoped that the new government would choose to continue to pursue bilateral ties with Russia.
