= Marat Kambolov =

South Ossetian politician

- Марат Камболов; Марат Хъамболты
- Kambolov in 2026

President of South Ossetia
- Incumbent
- Assumed office 30 September 2026 (Note: Acting: 23 June 2026 – 30 September 2026)
- Prime Minister: Himself; Soslan Margiev
- Preceded by: Alan Gagloyev

Prime Minister of South Ossetia
- In office 16 June 2026 – 30 September 2026
- President: Alan Gagloyev; Himself (acting)
- Preceded by: Dzambolat Tadtaev; Konstantin Dzhioev (acting)
- Succeeded by: Soslan Margiev

Personal details
- Born: 2 January 1965 (age 61) Khaznidon, North Ossetian Autonomous Soviet Socialist Republic, Russian SFSR, Soviet Union
- Education: Gorsky Agricultural Institute; Moscow State Social University; Russian Academy of Public Administration

Marat Arkadyevich Kambolov (Russian: Марат Аркадьевич Камболов; Iron Ossetic: Марат Аркадийы фырт Хъамболты, Marat Arkadijy fyrt Qambolty) is a South Ossetian civil servant currently serving as the President of the Republic of South Ossetia since 30 September 2026.

== Early life ==
Kambolov was born on 2 January 1965, in the village of Khaznidon, Irafsky District, North Ossetia. He graduated from the Gorsky Agricultural Institute[ru] in Vladikavkaz in 1988 and earned additional degrees from the Moscow State Social University and the Russian Academy of Public Administration.

== Political career ==
Kambolov served as Russian Deputy Minister of Education from 2010 to 2014, before holding senior positions at the Kurchatov Institute, where he served as director from 2021 to 2025. He also worked for the Federal Antimonopoly Service.

=== 2026 political crisis ===
On 25 May 2026, the Russian Federation and the Republic of South Ossetia signed a treaty on deeper integration, which included a provision that any Russian citizen can hold elected office in South Ossetia, and vice versa. The incumbent South Ossetian President, Alan Gagloyev, had been persistently shadowed by corruption allegations since taking office, with approximately 3 billion roubles (about US$39 million) of Russian financial aid to South Ossetia alleged to have been embezzled by Gagloyev and his original prime minister, Konstantin Dzhussoev, resulting in Dzhussoev's dismissal on 21 January 2026.

Gagloyev then appointed Kambolov as his adviser on 'the implementation of the integration deal between South Ossetia and Russia on 27 May. On 8 June 2026, the incumbent South Ossetian Prime Minister, Dzambolyt Tadtayev, dismissed his cabinet and resigned at Gagloyev's request, who stated his intention to replace him with Kambolov. Tadtayev's deputy, Konstantin Dzhioev, served as acting prime minister until the Parliament of South Ossetia voted to appoint Kambolov as prime minister on 16 June.

Kambolov's first act as prime minister was to give a speech to the Parliament of the Republic of South Ossetia stating that he would base his new cabinet picks around demographics, arguing that South Ossetia's rapid population decline was the republic's single greatest issue. Legal scholars pointed out that although the treaty had been ratified by both sides, South Ossetia had not amended its constitution, and it is still a requirement for the prime minister to have lived in the country for ten years – a condition Kambolov has not met.

== Presidency ==
=== 2026 presidential election ===
To complete Kambolov's rise, Gagloyev resigned as President on 23 June 2026, to become aide to Russian president Vladimir Putin. Under South Ossetia's constitution, the Prime Minister, Kambolov, served as acting President until a new election can be held. The next presidential elections were scheduled for 18 September 2026, there is a requirement that a candidate must have permanently resided in South Ossetia for the last 10 years before the date of registration. This would have invalidated Kambolov from running, but he was endorsed by all major South Ossetian political parties who hold 25 out of 34 deputies in the Parliament of South Ossetia (Nykhas, United Ossetia, Communist Party of South Ossetia and People's Party) as well as former Presidents of South Ossetia Lyudvig Chibirov, Leonid Tibilov and Anatoly Bibilov.

Kambolov easily won the election, with early results showing him winning about 85 percent of the vote according to the South Ossetia's Central Election Commission.

Kambolov appointed Soslan Margiev as Prime Minister of South Ossetia.
