= Development Party (South Ossetia) =

Development Party Партия развития
- The party does not have its own logo, but uses the seal of South Ossetia
- Leader: Albert Valiev
- Founded: April 5, 2023
- Ideology: Economic Autarky; Political Autarky; Reformism; Ossetian Unification
- Slogan: development, freedom, initiative, responsibility, dignity, progress

The Development Party is a political party in the partially recognized Caucasian republic of South Ossetia (Note: All but 6 UN members view South Ossetia as part of Georgia illegally occupied by Russia) that was formed in the buildup to the 2024 parliamentary election.

== History ==
The party's creation was announced on April 5, 2023, when it released its first manifesto. In it the party called for reforms that would turn South Ossetia into a "modern democratic republic." The party also stated that it will be relying on grassroots support, and that it will support healthy intra-party democracy on policy issues, allowing members to directly vote on which stances the party should take.

On February 2, 2024, the party's leader Albert Valiev gave an interview to the State Information Agency about the parties positions as follows: The party supports an effective economy, a stable state system, and state development in business and sciences. The party strives for the political and economic independence of South Ossetia and in order to accomplish this they support strengthening South Ossetia's institutions and to implement checks and balances that drastically limits the powers of the Presidency reducing it to a figurehead role, as well as an independent judiciary. The party also supports increasing the size of the South Ossetian Army, and supports "Maximum integration with the Russian Federation."

=== 2024 election ===
At a congress on April 18, 2024, the party announced a full slate of 27 candidates for the Proportional section of the 2024 election, however, refused to stand candidates in single-district constituencies. The party does not support the existence of the current mixed system, and advocates for the abolition of single-district constituencies in favor of a nationwide proportional system, as well as reducing the threshold to enter parliament to be reduced from 7% to 3%.

The development party was barred from participating in the election due to Nykhaz attempting to win over its voter base for its own candidates. The specific reason the Central Election Commission (CEC) cited for their disqualification was that there was a discrepancy in the date in which their party list was created, and the date in which it was submitted to the CEC. The CEC stated that although the list was created before the April 17 deadline, that it was only submitted to the CEC on April 24. This was the first time that a party and its candidates where barred from an election for this, with political commentators from Radio Free Europe noting that there is no specific law mandating the deadline requirements in the first place. Additionally the party's chairman Valiev was barred from participating, with the CEC claiming he also holds Georgian citizenship. This was despite him proving in court that he does not hold Georgian Citizenship during the 2022 Presidential Election when he was also barred from participating for the same reason. In fact, the CEC's decisions directly contradicted the 2022 ruling of the Supreme Court of South Ossetia, as they released their reasons why the parties where disqualified days after the parties received notifications that they were disqualified.
