= Amiran Dyakonov =

South Ossetian politician

Leader of the People's Party of South Ossetia
- In office 2019–2024

Member of the Parliament of South Ossetia
- Incumbent
- Assumed office 2009

Personal details
- Party: For Justice (since 2024); People's Party (2014-2024); Unity Party (before 2014)

Amiran Dyakonov is an Ossetian politician from the partially recognized Caucasian Republic of South Ossetia, which most of the UN recognizes as part of Georgia, occupied by Russia. Dyakonov is a veteran legislator for the People's Party, previously being a member of the Unity Party.

== Career ==
In 2010 Dyakonov was sued by Prime Minister Vadim Brovtsev for libel, as Dyakonov quoted Brovtsev criticizing Russian president Vladimir Putin to Russian news agencies, namely, Brovtsev was quoted criticizing the mechanism Putin created to transfer funds to South Ossetia. In 2015 Dyakonov voiced support for a vote of no confidence that removed David Sanakoev from his post as Minister of Foreign Affairs due to leaking a drafted treaty with Russia to Georgian media which included the annexation of South Ossetia by Russia.

In 2014 Dyakonov, then the chairman of the parliamentary committee on legislation, law and local self-government, proposed replacing the term "foreign agent" to describe NGOs funded by foreign nations as "foreign partners." The law would be adopted by parliament, however, NGO representatives who were present argued that the change was simply pedantic, and didn't change the underlying legal status of the NGOs. Also in 2014, Dyakonov broke from the Unity Party's ranks by criticizing their leader, Eduard Kokoity stating that he was more preoccupied bribing Russian officials with money set aside for infrastructure reconstruction than actually serving the South Ossetian people.

In 2018 Dyakonov criticized the creation of the Otkhozoria–Tatunashvili List, and criticism levied against South Ossetia for the Murder of Archil Tatunashvili, calling it an anti-Ossetian Bacchanalia in an interview with Russian state media, stating that a criminal case was being prepared in South Ossetia for its organizers, for "perpetuating a genocide" of South Ossetians. Dyakonov also claimed, as part of the case, that the Ministry of Defense of Georgia killed 30 Ossetians from 2004 to 2008.

After the 2019 parliamentary election Dyakonov was named the chairman of the government's mandate commission, and he nominated United Ossetia's Alan Tadtayev to be named speaker with 25 members of parliament voting in favor, 8 abstaining, and 1 voting against. Afterwards Dyakonov would serve as the head of the parliamentary committee on national policies, culture, religion and media, as which, he denounced Georgian efforts to establish a checkpoint near the village of Tsnelis.

Also serving in his function of head of the parliamentary committee on national policies, culture, religion and media, Dyakonov organized the 100th anniversary of the "Ossetian people’s genocide" claiming that the Mensheviks' 1918 to 1920 effort to dislodge Ossetian insurgents, was a genocide.

Dyakonov was a vocal critic of Anatoly Bibilov, claiming that Bibilov's positions, namely those revolving around the budget, “do not quite correspond to reality” expressing anger that Bibilov was focusing on minor domestic issues, when the issue of Tsnelis' checkpoint dominated nearly all debates in parliament.

During the 2022 presidential election Dyakonov was one of four members of parliament to support the return of former president Eduard Kokoity to power. However, Kokoity was not able to legally run as he does not meet the residency requirement, which states that a candidate for president must live in South Ossetia, while Kokoity had been living in exile in Moscow since his resignation.

Despite the People's Party being in the ruling coalition with president Alan Gagloev's party, Nykhaz, Dyakonov has been a vocal critic of Gagloev, accusing the president of merging the powers and responsibilities of the three branches of government to rule without checks and balances. He has also stated that all the systemic problems that existed before the 2022 election remain, and that "We must make up our minds: either we are building a state, or we are part of Russia. And if we are building a democratic state based on the rule of law, the system of checks and balances between the branches of government must work." Dyakonov also expressed dissatisfaction with transitioning from coal to gas power plants, the crisis in the health care system and the "artificial" fragmentation of the political field.

In 2022 Dyakonov, alongside Alan Gagloev and one of his staffers, Anna Kumaritova, as well as two other members of parliament Zaza Driaev and Vitaly Ikaev, nominated Konstantin Dzhussoev as prime minister, and supported the removal of Timur Kokoity from the Central Election Commission, and the replacement of Magomed Bagaev as Prosecutor General of South Ossetia.

In 2024 Dyakonov supported the 22 year in absentia prison sentences to three former South Ossetian politicians who are fugitives in Russia. The trio consisted of; Yan Karkusov, an advisor to Dmitry Sanakoyev, Yan's brother, Jemal Karkusov, member of parliament, shadow minister of internal affairs, and former head of the South Ossetian security council, and their accomplice, Georgy Gogichaev. The Supreme Court of South Ossetia found the trio guilty of “preparing terrorist acts in South Ossetia at the behest of Georgian intelligence services” in 2005, when they defected to Georgia and organized a "rival government" to South Ossetia and where joined by their third brother, Uruzmag Karkusov. South Ossetia considered the rival government a "terrorist organization" and claimed that the Karkusov brothers where conspiring with Gogichaev, and a fourth brother, Alan Karkusov, who still resided in Tskhinvali, to stage a coup.

In 2024 Dyakonov joined the newly formed political party For Justice formed by David Sanakoev Harry Muldarov and Dzambolyt Medoev.
