= Timur Tskhovrebov =

South Ossetian politician

- Occupations: Journalist, political activist, civil rights activist
- Years active: 2009–2018
- Known for: Editor of The XXI Seculare; Founder of Iron

Timur Tskhovrebov is a journalist, politician, and civil rights activist from the disputed state of South Ossetia, which the international community recognizes as part of Georgia. Known for being a staunch member of the opposition, Tskhovrebov campaigns against the South Ossetian government and the Russian presence in the country, which he argues has subverted the sovereignty of the Ossetian people.

== Biography ==
Tskhovrebov first entered the public sphere in South Ossetia when he, a local tomato farmer, organized a ten-man Ossetian militia during the First Ossetian War, bribing Soviet personnel to loot military warehouses, using the surplus equipment to trade for civilian goods and luxuries in North Ossetia.

After the war, Tskhovrebov became an independent journalist and editor of the opposition newspaper The XXI Seculare, who also led an unofficial union of veterans from the First Ossetian War who announced his intention to form a new political party in May 2009, shortly after the People's Party suffered it's hostile takeover. Tskhovrebov gained international attention during the Russo-Georgian War as he and his newspaper was the only domestic newspaper in South Ossetia that helped Human Rights Watch (HRW) and the Russia Justice Initiative, while also personally protecting several journalists.

Tskhovrebov's party would officially be founded on May 22, 2010, as Iron, which Tskhovrebov named Mukhar Sanakoyev as the party's first chairman of its governing council. Shortly after the party was officially founded, Tskhovrebov announced that neither he nor the party was opposed to the existence of South Ossetia, and that they were vehemently opposed to Georgian reintegration, and that the party simply has a differing opinion on legislation, economic matters, and foreign policy to that of the ruling pro-Russian government.

On July 24, 2010, Tskhovrebov, and another journalist from XXI Seculare, Maria Pliyeva, were attacked on the steps of the Parliament of South Ossetia by approximately 10 individuals, including 3 sitting members of parliament and would be hospitalized with multiple injuries. Holly Cartner, the then director of the HRW's Europe and Central Asian affairs, stated that "[The HRW is] appalled by the attack on Tskhovrebov and deeply concerned about the safety of activists in South Ossetia," and called for an investigation into the incident. Tskhovrebov stated that he recognized one of the men as one of his critics as the group pulled him aside "for some questions" for beating him in an ally. Tskhovrebov was able to escape after a gun was pulled on him, and jumped a fence to enter the nearby Red Cross compound close to parliament. Tskhovrebov's attack was retaliation for his signing of a document supporting the resolutions of the Geneva International Discussions (GID). After the attacks, Tskhovrebov moved to Vladikavkaz, the capital of North Ossetia, where he has worked with Civic Imitative, a non-profit that works to integrate South Ossetians into North Ossetia.

The development of Iron as a functioning political party was stunted when Eduard Kokoity's administration rejected the parties registration, with the party being forced to disband shortly after as they could not contest upcoming elections.

Starting in 2009, in preparation for the 2012 South Ossetian presidential election and the 2014 South Ossetian parliamentary election Tskhovrebov, besides trying to make his own party, was deeply involved in political action groups across the country to generally increase the number of political parties within the country, stating that due to South Ossetia's loyalty to Russia, unlike other separatist Republics, should warrant South Ossetia more political freedom to choose its own politician from more than the approved Kremlin backed party, or from the old tradition of every politician in South Ossetia either being an Independent, or a member of the Communist Party of South Ossetia.

In 2018 Tskhovrebov led a movement demanding more domestic Industry in South Ossetia, which is almost wholly reliant from imports from Russia. Tskhovrebov fears that should the Russian state run out of usefulness for the South Ossetian state, that Russia will stop propping up the South Ossetian economy, and that a domestic manufacturing capacity would negate both Russian domination of the market, as well as reduce shortages.
