= Iron (political party, 2010) =

South Ossetian Political parties

Iron Ирон
- Leader: Timur Tskhovrebov
- Governing body: Governing Council
- Chairman: Mukhar Sanakoyev
- Founder: Timur Tskhovrebov
- Founded: 2010
- Dissolved: 2014
- Split from: People's Party of South Ossetia
- Membership (2010): 72
- Ideology: Ossetian nationalism Russoskepticism; Autarky; Anti-corruption
- Political position: Center
- Slogan: "Freedom-Fatherland-Law"

Iron is the name of two political parties that existed in different points in time in the disputed state of South Ossetia, which the international community recognizes as part of Georgia. The first, from 2010, was founded by South Ossetian dissidents.

== History ==
The original Iron was founded on May 22, 2010, by Timur Tskhovrebov during a founding congress at the Tskhinvali City Hall which also established the party's slogan as "Freedom-Fatherland-Law." The party's leadership has described itself as the only political party in South Ossetia not beholden to either the Government or the Russians and was seen as a successor to Roland Kelekhsayev's People's Party of South Ossetia, which would be hijacked by pro-Government politicians in 2009. Iron's first chairman of its governing council was Mukhar Sanakoyev. Shortly after the party was officially founded Tskhovrebov announced that neither he nor the party was opposed to the existence of South Ossetia, and that they were vehemently opposed to Georgian reintegration, and that the party simply has a differing opinion on legislation, economic matters, and foreign policy to that of the ruling pro-Russian government. At the party's founding congress 72 people officially joined the party, while an additional 300 showing interest in joining.

The main message of our party is the construction of a sovereign legal democratic Ossetian state. Today this is only possible through changing the Constitution and institutions of state power

— Vissarion Aseev, a member of the party's political council

Shortly after the party was founded, its leader, Tskhovrebov, would be attacked by pro-Russian politicians, including at least three sitting members of the Parliament of South Ossetia and would be hospitalized, leading to the Human Rights Watch calling for an investigation to be opened into the incident. Boris Chochiev, the South Ossetian presidential envoy to the Geneva International Discussions (GID), denounced the investigation and called Tskhovrebov, and all members and supporters of the party, "traitors" since they signed a letter supporting the resolution of the GID which called on both sides to cease hostilities, and to allow the return of displaced ethnic Georgians to their homes in South Ossetia.

The party planned on developing regional affiliates and local offices for the party throughout the country and participate in the 2014 South Ossetian parliamentary election. However, the pro-Russian administration of Eduard Kokoity blocked the party from receiving official registration, thus disqualifying it from standing with the party disbanding shortly after.

== Successor party ==
Following his release from prison, Georgiy Kabisov, a vocal pro-Russian politician who was arrested on the charge of running an espionage ring to gather blackmail on members of the South Ossetian parliament, announced that he was going to be creating a political party named Iron, in reference to the 2010 party, as a new South Ossetian opposition party.
