= State Security Committee (South Ossetia) =

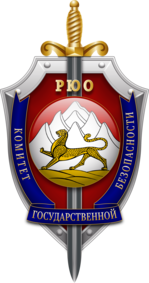
- Insignia of the KGB

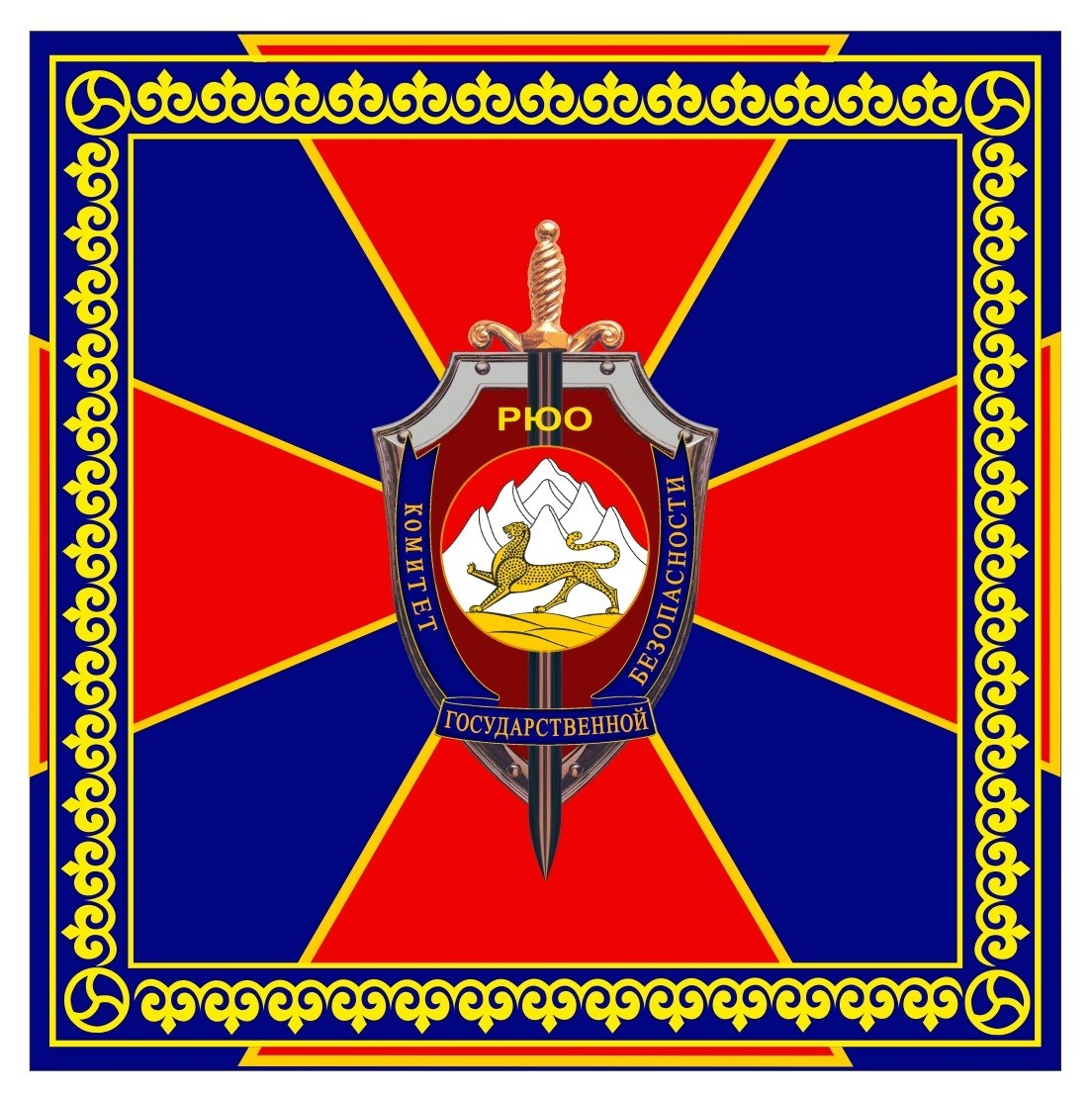
- Flag of the KGB

Security agency overview
- Jurisdiction: South Ossetia
- Status: Part of FSB
- Headquarters: Tskhinvali
- Head responsible: Yuriy Kadiy
- Website: kgbruo.org

The State Security Committee, (Note: Russian: Комитет государственной безопасности Республики Южная Осетия, КГБ РЮО) abbreviated as KGB is the secret police agency of the partially recognized Republic of South Ossetia tasked with internal security, intelligence gathering, and similar functions to the Soviet Union's KGB, which it claims to be a legal continuation of. In 2025 Russia took over control and operations of the KGB, making it subservient to the FSB.

== History ==
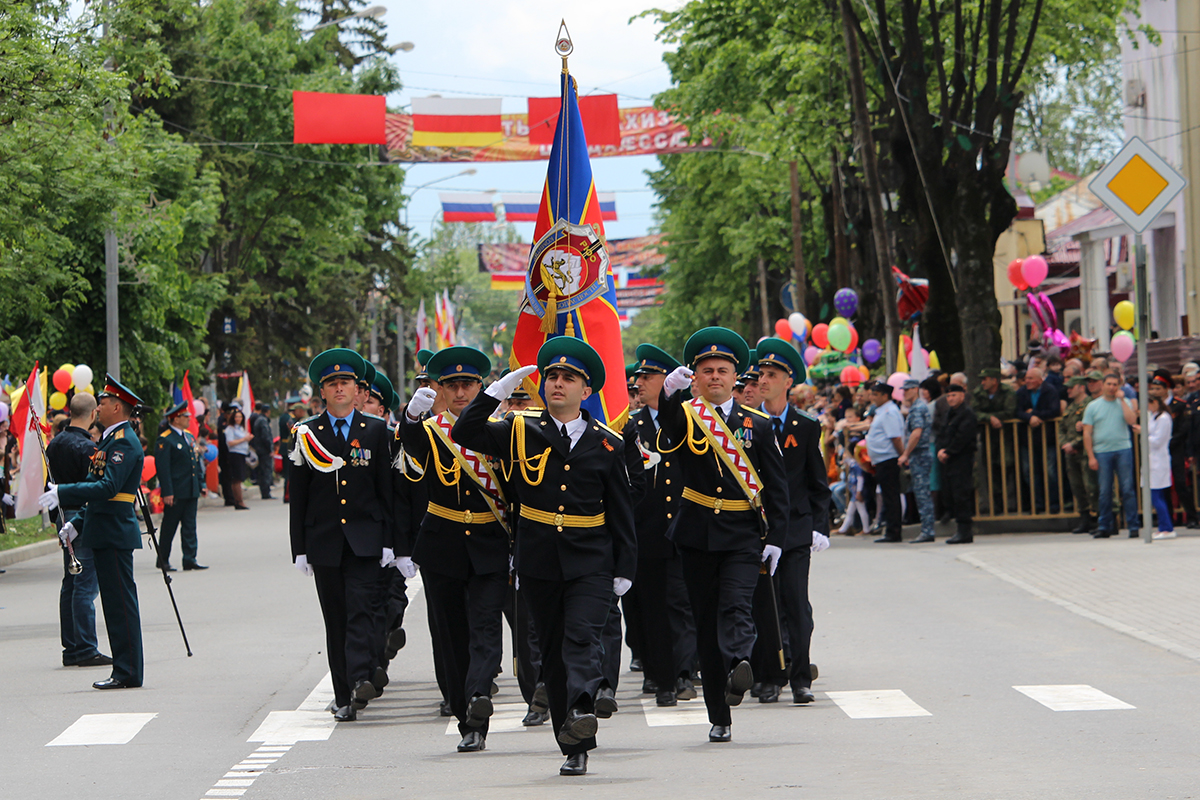
The KGB on parade during the 2018 Victory Day celebration in Tskhinvali.

The South Ossetian KGB claims direct linage from the South Ossetian Revkom's Cheka office established on 25 February 1921. The South Ossetian Revolutionary Committee, responding to the call of the Cheka, formed its own Extraordinary Commission and Politburo, the first structure to carry out the functions of ensuring state security on the territory of South Ossetia. On March 13, 1954, the KGB was created and the South Ossetian Directorate of the Committee for State Security of the Georgian Soviet Socialist Republic was also established. During the collapse of the Soviet Union local KGB agents chose to stand with the breakaway South Ossetia instead of Georgia. On May 28, 1992, South Ossetia formed its Ministry of Security as one of its first ministries, before even the army, consisting of these KGB defectors. In 1994 the Ministry of Security was renamed to the State Security Committee.

The KGB took part in urban combat in the Battle of Tskhinvali during the Russo-Georgian War and coordinated the city's defenses prior to the arrival of Russian troops. On April 30, 2009, the KGB and the Russian FSB signed a treaty "On Cooperation and Mutual Assistance" which has KGB agents trained in FSB universities receiving the same education.

=== Loss of autonomy ===
Prior to 2025 the KGB had directly reported to Tskhinvali and not Moscow, and produced much of the republic's political stock, including the 3rd President Leonid Tibilov, 5th President Alan Gagloev, and Prime Minister Konstantin Dzhioev.

However, on April 21, 2025, at the behest of Moscow, the head of the KGB was sacked and replaced with Yuriy Kadiy, a high-ranking member of FSB leadership, that had until then been the deputy head of the Abkhazian SGB. Moscow demanded his instatement after Gagloev sacked a number of KGB officers including longtime head Oleg Sheeran, allegedly for discovering his friend, former deputy head Alexander Tuaev's, smuggling activities. As Kadiy is not a South Ossetian resident, the government had to use a stipulation in one of their friendship treaties with Russia to transfer the control and operations of the KGB to Moscow, meaning South Ossetia has no say in its operations.

== Roles ==
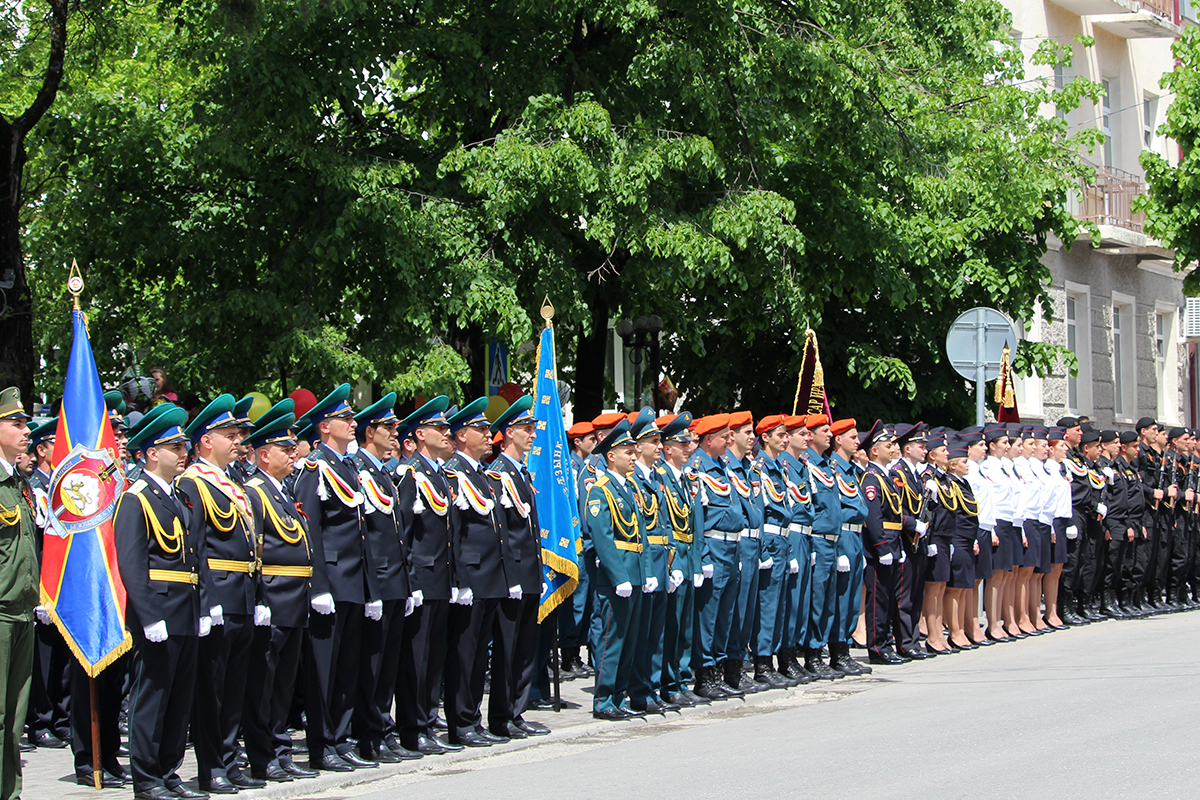
KGB standing at attention in 2018.

In 2020 KGB head Sheeran stated that the main goal of the agency is to "counter the intelligence and subversive activities of foreign special services" and to ensure the "timely neutralization of terrorist and extremist organizations". The agency is also involved in routine crime fighting. The KGB, alongside the Russian FSB are also tasked with guarding the de facto borders with Georgia.

== Incidents ==
The KGB have been involved in a number of high-profile kidnappings and murders of Georgian citizens either traveling through the country, or straying too close to the de facto border, as well as brutality against their own civilians. These include but are not limited to:

- Murder of Archil Tatunashvili: The 2018 kidnapping and murder of a Georgian Army veteran, body eventually returned to Georgia with 100+ stab wounds and no internal organs.
- Murder of Inal Djabiev: In 2020 a South Ossetian opposition activist was accused without evidence of attempting to assassinate the interior minister and tortured to death leading to months of protests, the sacking of Anatoly Bibilov's government, and his eventual defeat in 2022. KGB officially deny involvement, insisting it was the local police.

== Organization ==
Until 2025 the KGB reported directly to the Supreme Commander of the Armed Forces of the Republic of South Ossetia. Since 2025 they now report to the Russian FSB.

=== List of leaders ===
No.	Name	Rank	Tenure	Notes
1.	Leonid Tibilov	Major-General	1992–1994	Graduated from higher courses of the KGB in Minsk in 1981.
2.	Anzor Tibilov	Lieutenant Colonel	1994–1995	KGB Chief of Irbitsky from 1982 to 1983.
-	Leonid Tibilov	Major-General	1995–1998	Second tenure. Later became President.
3.	Guram Sobaev	Major-General	1998–2001	Former Soviet KGB agent.
4.	Alexander Valliyev	Colonel	2001–2002	
5.	Robert Tabuyev	Colonel	2002–2003	
6.	Oleg Alborov	Major-General	2003–2004	Former Soviet KGB agent.
7.	Mairbeg Bichegkuyev	Major General	2004	
8.	Anatoly Yarovoy	Lieutenant General	2004–2006	Involved in initial formation of committee, structured KGB off Russian FSB.
9.	Nikolai Dolgopolov	Major General	2006	
10.	Boris Attoev	Lieutenant-General	2006–2014	Soviet-Afghan war veteran, personally engaged in street fighting during the battle of Tskhinvali.
11.	Viktor Shargayev	Lieutenant-General	2014–2017	
12.	Mikhail Shabanov	Colonel	2017–2018	
13.	Oleg Sheeran	Lieutenant-General	2019–2025	Soviet Airborne veteran and former FSB agent.
14.	Yuriy Kadiy	Major General	2025–present	Former FSB agent and deputy chairman of Abkhazia's SGB.
