= Patriots of Alanya =

- Leader: Dzambolat Tedeev
- Founded: 2023, 2026
- Dissolved: 2024
- Merged into: People's Party
- Headquarters: Tskhinvali
- Ideology: Soviet nationalism; Social conservatism; Russophilia
- Political position: Right-wing
- Leanings: Anti-Kokoity

Patriots of Alanya (Iron Ossetic: Аланийы патриоттæ, romanized: Alanijy patriottæ; Russian: Патриоты Алании, romanized: Patrioty Alanii) is a political party in the partially recognized Caucasian republic of South Ossetia founded on November 11, 2023, and merged into the People's Party on April 16, 2024.

== History ==
The party was founded during a congress at the hotel Iryston in Tskhinvali on November 11, 2023, with its founder Dzambolat Tedeev being elected the inaugural chairman. Tedeev, a former member of the Parliament of North Ossetia and coach of the Russian freestyle wrestling team gained notoriety when he commissioned a bronze statue of Russian president Vladimir Putin in a judo outfit in the village of Tsorbis in 2019, and proposing the construction a bronze statue of Stalin in the capital. Tedeev had formerly dabbled in South Ossetian politics, supporting Alla Dzhioeva after he was barred from standing for the 2011 South Ossetian presidential election due to residency requirements. As one of his few actions as party chairman, Tedeev made a public statement accusing Eduard Kokoity of embezzling nearly half of the Russian aid sent to South Ossetia after the 2008 Russo-Georgian war and pocketing it for himself.

The party had hoped to stand in the 2024 South Ossetian parliamentary election, however, quickly realized that it had registered six months prior to the election, when the deadline for registration was 1 year prior. It had been rumored that the party would merge with the Fatherland Socialist Party to utilize their byline since they shared a similar ideology, however, never did. Afterwards Tedeev attempted to "buy" the leadership position of the Unity Party, however, unity's leadership refused his offer despite preparing to liquidate the party's assets due to impending bankruptcy.

In what was described as a "surprising" move, the Patriots of Alanya chose to merge into the People's Party, despite not sharing an ideology with them, in order for their candidates to stand for the election on their byline, in exchange for extensive monetary support for the People's Party. This merger was not well received by People's Party deputies or voters, with two of their five members of parliament; Dzambolat Medoev and Amiran Diakonov leaving the party due to "ideological differences." The deputies also alleged that the People's Party leadership did not consult with its MPs or voters prior to the merger, doing so unilaterally.

== Reformation ==
Following the failure of the People's Party to significantly increase its vote share in the 2024 election the two parties again split, with Patriots of Alanya holding a party congress in 2026 where they named Murat Valiyev as their candidate for the 2026 South Ossetian presidential election as Tedeev does not meet the residency requirements to run himself.
