= Arsen Kvezerov =

South Ossetian politician

Arsen Aslanovich Kvezerov

Member of the Parliament of South Ossetia
- Incumbent
- Assumed office 2019

Personal details
- Party: People's Party of South Ossetia

Arsen Aslanovich Kvezerov is an Ossetian politician from the partially recognized Caucasian Republic of South Ossetia, which most of the United Nations recognizes as part of Georgia, occupied by Russia.

== Biography ==
In 2019 Kvezerov served on a committee denouncing the 1918-1920 Georgian–Ossetian conflict as a genocide of the Ossetian people.

In the fall of 2023 South Ossetia saw a massive increase in price for gasoline and other petroleum products. Alan Tekhov claimed that the 261.8% increase in import export rates was not impacting the price of petroleum products, and that the cause of the increase was due to the government enforcing the 20% value-added tax at the South Ossetian-Russian border. Kvezerov retorted that the price of gas was quickly escaping rates that the average South Ossetian can afford, and that this price hike, if not mitigated, could result in a crisis.

Kvezerov is a vocal supporter of South Ossetia agriculture, frequently supporting efforts to support farmers and increase domestic foodstuff production. In February 2024 Kvezerov dissented to a subsidy package for small and medium-sized business, stating that the money would be better allocated for farmers. Kvezerov also advocates for reducing customs and duties imposed on people traveling from Russia to South Ossetia.

Kvezerov was named chairman of the parliamentary the accounting commission. Due to this Kvezerov is frequently involved in committees and negotiations revolving around the state budget and allocation of state resources. In 2023, as Deputy Chairman of the Committee on Economics, Small Business, and Agriculture, Kvezerov went on a state visit to Abkhazia during their Victory Day Parades exchanging gifts with Abkhazian lawmakers. Kvezerov also served on the committee on foreign policy and inter-parliamentary relations, approving a motion to increase cooperation with the Syrian People's Assembly.

In 2022 Kvezerov, alongside Robert Ostaev and Harry Muldarov, personally delivered aid to Ossetian fighters on the side of Russia during their invasion of Ukraine.
