= Alan Tekhov =

South Ossetian politician

Deputy Prime Minister of South Ossetia
- In office 2012–2017
- President: Leonid Tibilov

Member of the Parliament of South Ossetia

Alan Tekhov is an Ossetian politician from the partially recognized Caucasian Republic of South Ossetia, which most of the UN recognizes as part of Georgia, occupied by Russia. Tekhov was a senior member of the executive of Leonid Tibilov, serving as the head of his administration, and deputy Prime Minister of South Ossetia.

== Biography ==
=== Deputy ===
Tekhov served as the head of the presidential administration for Leonid Tibilov, during which, he helped quell protests following the 2017 South Ossetian presidential election, giving a speech on the Tibilov owned Ir radio and television station. the protests centered around the South Ossetian Supreme Court rejecting a case from former president Eduard Kokoity that he met South Ossetia's residency requirements to stand for the election. Additionally, during this election, Tekhov had to defend Tibilov in the local media, as Tibilov's age was one of the key aspects of the election, with Tekhov stating that Tibilov is just as mentally sharp as his opponent Anatoly Bibilov. Alan Tekhov, as deputy prime minister, served as the head of a trade delegation to Golestan, Iran, to open and develop trade between Iran and South Ossetia. Tekhov's delegation would be joined by agricultural minister Vitaly Pliev.

=== Member of parliament ===
During his time in parliament, Tekhov has also served as the chairman of the profile committee and worked to reduce government restrictions on infrastructure projects. During this period he proposed land reclamation of a landfill north of Tskhinvali, reconstructing the hydroelectric dam across the Zonkar reservoir, creating agricultural projects in the Leningor district, implementing electric meters across the country, and connecting major towns with fiber optic cables. Very few of his proposals were implemented. Tekhov briefly stood for the 2022 South Ossetian presidential election, before ultimately withdrawing from the race prior to the first round. On June 5, 2023, Tekhov issued a proposal to parliament to open an investigation on possible Belarusian recognition of South Ossetia, a motion which was approved by speaker Alan Alborov to be led by the chairman of the committee on foreign policy and inter-parliamentary relations, Zaza Driaev.
