= Alymbeg Pliyev =

South Ossetian politician

Member of the Parliament of South Ossetia
- In office 1990–1994

Alymbeg Pliyev is a South Ossetian politician, who served in the first convocation of the South Ossetian parliament. 1990–1994

== Biography ==
Pliyev was a member of the South Ossetian Supreme Soviet, the governing body of the South Ossetian Autonomous Oblast, and was a stringent Ossetian nationalist, claiming that not only was Georgia a fascist state, but that the Georgian people where a fascistic people determined to eradicate all Ossetians. Pliyev voted in favor of the South Ossetian Autonomous Oblast declaring its independence from Georgia on September 20, 1990.

Pliyev also called for the Roki Tunnel to be renamed after Ruten Gagloev, the Ossetian engineer who helped design it.

Pilyev also claimed that South Ossetia only made "only correct" decisions during the South Ossetia war, including the expulsion of the almost 30% of South Ossetia's population that was Georgian, as stating they were proponents of "Georgian fascism."

Pilyev attempted to stand for the 2022 South Ossetian presidential election, however, was disqualified by the Central Election Commission.
