= Vitaly Pliev =

South Ossetian politician

South Ossetian Minister of Agriculture
- President: Leonid Tibilov

Znaur District Head

Personal details
- Party: Independent
- Occupation: Businessman

Vitaly Pliev is an Ossetian politician from the partially recognized Caucasian Republic of South Ossetia, which most of the UN recognizes as part of Georgia, occupied by Russia.

== Biography ==
Pliev made a small fortune as a businessman in his native Znaur District, establishing and operating a large trout, salmon, and sturgeon farm located in the village of Gufta along the Patsa River.

=== Political career ===
Pliev was elected the District Head of Znaur, surviving in that capacity when a Russian delegation, consisting of Rashid Nurgaliyev and Tatiana Golikova, where hosted in Znaur at the behest of president Leonid Tibilov. Tibilov would go on to be named to Tibilov's cabinet, as the minister of agriculture. In that capacity, Pliev joined a trade delegation to Golestan, Iran, led by Alan Tekhov, to open and develop trade between Iran and South Ossetia.

After exiting politics Pliev remained a vocal member of the anti-establishment opposition, criticism the ruling Anatoly Bibilov during a 2022 incident where Georgian police established a checkpoint at the village of Tsnelis, which South Ossetia claimed was past the border established by the ceasefire to the 2008 Russo-Georgian War. Pliev blamed the crisis on the pro-Russian government, and claimed residents of Tsnelis, which South Ossetia claims as part of the Znaur district, reported as far back as his tenure as district head that Georgian police would often launch excursions into the village, but that the government did nothing about it.
