= Konstantin Dzhioyev =

South Ossetian politician

- Константин Джиоев

Acting Prime Minister of South Ossetia
- In office June 8, 2026 – June 16, 2026
- President: Alan Gagloev
- Preceded by: Dzambolat Tadtaev
- Succeeded by: Marat Kambolov

First Deputy Prime Minister of South Ossetia
- In office January 21, 2026 – June 8, 2026
- Preceded by: Alan Dzhioev

First Deputy Head of the Presidential Administration of Alan Gagloev
- In office April 16, 2024 – January 21, 2026
- Preceded by: Soslan Dzhusoev
- Succeeded by: Sarmat Chochiev

Personal details
- Born: May 6, 1989 (age 37) Tskhinvali, South Ossetian Autonomous Oblast, Georgian SSR, Soviet Union
- Education: Golitsyno Border Institute

Konstantin Muratovich Dzhioyev (Russian: Константин Муратович Джиоев; born May 6, 1989) is an Ossetian politician from the partially recognized Republic of South Ossetia who briefly served as the acting Prime Minister in 2026.

== Early life ==
Dzhioev was born on May 6, 1989, in Tskhinval, then part of the Soviet Union, and attended the Golitsyno Border Institute of the FSB of the Russian Federation. Starting on June 23, 2011, he has held various positions within the State Security Committee (KGB) of South Ossetia.

== Political career ==
On April 16, 2024, Dzhioev was named the First Deputy head of the Administration of President Alan Gagloev at the recommendation of then Prime Minister Konstantin Dzhussoev despite having no prior political experience. On January 21, 2026, Gagloev sacked Dzhussoev in the midst of a corruption scandal, replacing him with Dzambolat Tadtayev. In the same decree Dzhioev was released from the Presidential Administration to instead be named the First Deputy Prime Minister.

On 8 June, at the behest of Gagloev, who intends to replace him with his North Ossetian Presidential Advisor on Russian Integration, Marat Kambolov, Tadtayev would resign, with Dzhioev being named the acting Prime Minister until Kambolov can take the role. Dzhioev would serve just 9 days, the shortest tenure in South Ossetia's history beating Boris Chochiev's 66 days, as Kambolov would be voted in as Prime Minister on June 16.

=== Caretaker government ===
Although Tadtayev's government would resign alongside him, President Gagloev had his ministers continue to serve in an acting capacity through Dzhioev's government and into Kambolov's until the later appoints his own ministers.

Office	Holder
Deputy Prime Minister	Alan Dzhioev
Minister of Justice	Alan Dzhioev
Minister of Economic Development	Sarmat Kotayev
Head of the Presidential Administration	Alan Alborov
Minister of Labour and Social Protection	Oleg Gagloev
Minister of Civil Defence, Emergencies and Disaster Relief	Ibragim Gasseev
Minister of Foreign Affairs	Akhsar Dzhioev
Minister of Finance	Radion Kozayev
Minister of Culture	Grigory Mamiyev
Minister of Internal Affairs	Erislav Mamiyev
Minister of Agriculture	Vakhtang Mamitov
Minister of Health	Soslan Naniyev
Minister of Education and Science	Rimma Pilyeva
Minister of Construction	Zaur Chochiyev
Minister of Defence	Yury Yarovitsky

== Personal life ==
Dzhioev is married and has three children. Dzhioev is fluent in three languages: Ossetian, Russian, and English.
