= 2001 South Ossetian constitutional referendum =

A constitutional referendum was held in South Ossetia on 8 April 2001. The constitutional amendments would impose stricter requirements for presidential candidates, make the Russian language an official language alongside Ossetian, and make the Georgian language an official language in areas with a Georgian majority. The proposals were approved by 60% of voters.

== Results ==
Choice	Votes	%
For		60.00
Against		40.00
Invalid/blank votes		–
Total	23,540	100
Registered voters/turnout	45,000	
Source: Direct Democracy
