= Ira Farn =

Ira Farn Republican Political Party Республиканская политическая партия «Иры Фарн»
- The party's logo, depicting the Kostromskaya deer and traditional Assianism symbols; a Wasamonga cup, ears of hops and wheat, and a triskelion.
- Founder: Hoh Chochiev
- Founded: April 25, 2023
- Registered: May 28, 2024
- Ideology: Ossetian nationalism; Anti-Establishment; Reformism; Assianism interests; Autarky; Anti-Russian sentiment
- Colors: White; Red; Gold; (Ossetian national colors)

Ira Farn ("Soul of Ossetia"; Iron Ossetic: Иры фарн) is a political party in the disputed territory (Note: All but four UN members recognize Abkhazia and South Ossetia as part of Georgia under illegal occupation by Russian forces.) of South Ossetia.

== History ==
The party was formed via a constituent congress on April 25, 2023, where Hoh Chochiev was named the party's chairman. The Congress was attended by district heads, and members of the Ministry of Justice. At the congress the party rejected populism and called for the creation of a strong state, and the unification of the Ossetian peoples.

The party announced its registration on May 28, 2024, simultaneously releasing its manifesto which outlined the party's positions. In which the party outlined three main goals; a strong competitive economy with high quality of life, increase of transparency and reduction in corruption, patriotism and the protection of the Ossetian people and land. The party also claims that South Ossetia is the successor to the medieval state of Alania, as well as supporting traditional Ossetian religion. The party also denounced western values, claiming it is corrupting the youth, and also called for a reduction and eventual end of economic subsidies from Russia.

During the 2024 South Ossetian parliamentary election, Ira Farn was one of just seven parties whose party list was approved by the Central Election Commission, and the only new party established after the previous election. During which the party got 4.75% of the vote, below the 7% threshold to enter parliament, additionally, none of the party's district candidates won their contests. During the aftermath of the election, where the pro-Russian establishment party United Ossetia accused the ruling party Nykhaz of rigging the election, Ira Farn's leadership denounced calls for a violent overthrow of the government. The party has nominally been supportive of Nykhaz, with party founder Chochiev congratulating the government in recognizing Assianian holidays at public holidays.
