= Dzambolyt Tadtayev =

South Ossetian politician

Dzambolat Tadtaev
- Дзамболат Тадтаты; Дзамболат Тадтаев

17th Prime Minister of South Ossetia
- In office February 11, 2026 – June 8, 2026; Acting: from January 21, 2026
- President: Alan Gagloev
- Preceded by: Konstantin Dzhussoev
- Succeeded by: Konstantin Dzhioev (acting); Marat Kambolov

Minister of Finance of South Ossetia
- In office October 23, 2023 – January 21, 2026
- Preceded by: Kazbek Tsarikaev

Personal details
- Born: October 31, 1990 (age 35) Tskhinvali, Tskhinvali Region, Georgian SSR, Soviet Union
- Education: Stavropol State University

Dzambolat Mervadikovich Tadtaev (also Tadtayev; (Note: Iron Ossetic: Дзамболат Мервадикы фырт Тадтаты, romanized: Dzambolat Mervadiky fyrt Tadtaty Russian: Дзамболат Мервадикович Тадтаев) born October 31, 1990) is a South Ossetian politician, who served as Prime Minister of South Ossetia from February to June 2026.

== Biography ==
Tadtaev was born on October 31, 1990, in the South Ossetian capital of Tskhinvali. In 2012, he graduated from the Stavropol State University with a degree in organization management. From January to February 2013, Tadtayev worked as a consultant for the Department of Strategic Planning of the Department of Socioeconomic Planning in the South Ossetian Ministry of Finance. Then, from February 2013 to September 2013, he was the head of the Investment Policy Department for the Foreign Economic Relations Department. From September 2013 to February 2017, he was the head of the Foreign Economic Relations Department.

From February 2017 to March 2021, he was the first deputy finance minister. In this capacity, he blamed the rising price of fuel in South Ossetia due to Russian economic policies, stating that all fuel is imported from Russia, and therefore Russia controls the prices. On October 10, 2023, he represented South Ossetia at the Russian Union of Industrialists and Entrepreneurs summit.

=== Minister of Finance ===
On October 23, 2023, Tadtaev was named President Alan Gagloev's new minister of finance, and deputy prime minister, replacing Kazbek Tsarikaev. On February 5, 2024, Tadtaev met with Sergey Aksyonov to discuss a trade, economic, scientific, technical and cultural cooperation agreement between South Ossetia and the Republic of Crimea. On October 30, 2024, Tadtaev attended a meeting with Prime Minister Konstantin Dzhussoev, and the Minister of Construction Zaur Chochiev, where the government announced that refurbishing and expanding utilities would be its top priority.

=== Prime Minister ===
On February 11, 2026, by the decree of President Alan Gagloev, Tadtayev was appointed Prime Minister of South Ossetia. He had been serving in the capacity as acting prime minister after Konstantin Dzhussoev's government was dissolved on January 21. Tadtayev resigned from office on June 8, 2026. His deputy, Konstantin Dzhioev, was named acting prime minister, however, President Gagloev has stated his intention for the new Prime Minister to be North Ossetian Marat Kambolov who had previously been his adviser to oversee ‘the implementation of the integration deal between South Ossetia and Russia’.
