= Dzhambolat Tedeyev =

Russian freestyle wrestler (born 1968)

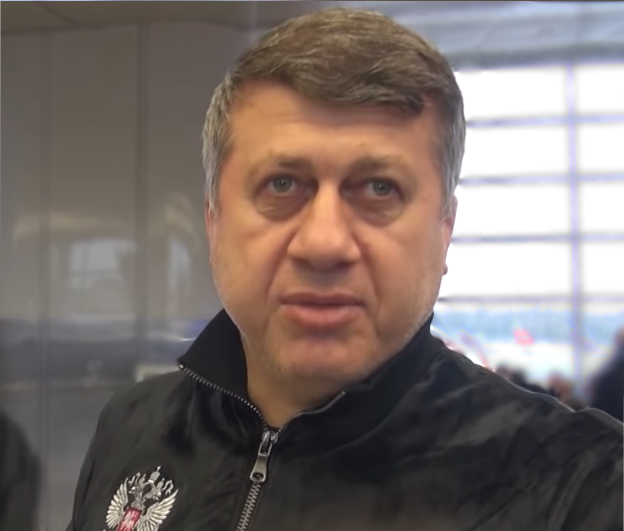

Personal information
- Full name: Dzhambolat Ilyich Tedeyev
- Nickname: "Dzhabo"
- Born: Дзамболат Ильич Тедеев; 23 August 1968 (age 57) Tskhinvali, Georgia, Soviet Union
- Home town: Vladikavkaz, North Ossetia-Alania, Russia
- Height: 180 cm (5 ft 11 in)
- Weight: 90 kg (200 lb)

Sport
- Country: Ukraine
- Sport: Sport wrestling
- Event: Freestyle
- Club: Dynamo Vladikavkaz WC
- Coached by: Artur Bazaev
Medal record
Men's freestyle wrestling
Representing Ukraine
European Championships
Gold medal – first place	1993 Istanbul	90 kg

Dzhambolat Ilyich Tedeyev (Iron Ossetic: Тедеты Ильяйы фырт Дзамболат, romanized: Tedety Iljajy fyrt Dzambolat; Russian: Дзамбола́т Ильи́ч Теде́ев) born 23 August 1968) is a Russian-Ukrainian former wrestler who competed in the 1996 Summer Olympics. He is the brother of Elbrus Tedeyev.

He came in first at the 1990 Soviet Union nationals. European Champion 1993 in Istanbul (90 kg). Tedeyev was a head coach of Russian freestyle wrestling national team (2001–2011, 2017–2021). Tedeyev is the youngest Russian coach ever.

== Championships and achievements ==
- As wrestler:
  - 1993 European Championships – 1st (90 kg)
- As coach:
  - UWW Russian national team world rankings – 1st (2001, 2005, 2006, 2007, 2009, 2010, 2011, 2018, 2019, 2021)

== Political career ==
In 2011 Tedeev attempted to participate in South Ossetias presidential elections of that year, however, was disqualified because he did not meet the 10-year residency requirement to hold the office. He ultimately supported the candidacy of Alla Dzhioeva, a long time opposition leader, who won the election, but had her victory annulled at Russia's behest.

Tedeyev started to become more involved in the politics in 2023 when he established his own political party, Patriots of Alania to contest the parliamentary elections in 2024. However, the party had registered after the six-month deadline for the election, and was not able to participate. Tedeyev attempted to "buy" the Unity Party but the party stated it would rather go bankrupt than sell its leadership. Ultimately the People's Party approved a merger with Patriots of Alania which resulted in the party fragmenting as three of their five MPs left the party in protest of the merger, insisting Patriots of Alania had no ideological similarities to the People's Party. The leadership of the People's Party stated that they approved the merger in exchange "for extensive monetary support."
