= Geneva International Discussions =

International diplomatic talks addressing the consequences of the 2008 Russo-Georgian War

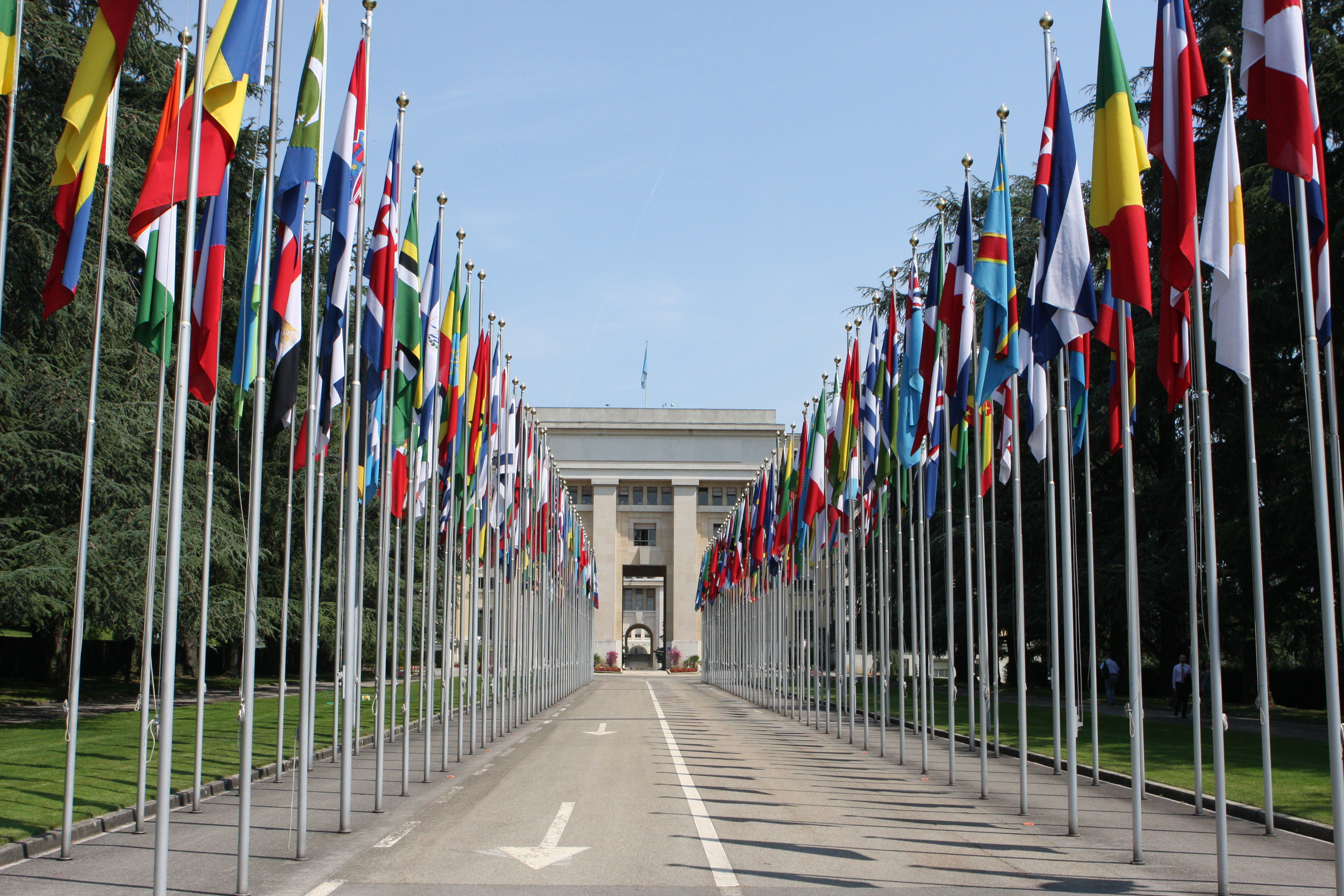
The Palais des Nations in Geneva, Switzerland, headquarters of the United Nations Office at Geneva and venue for the Geneva International Discussions.

The Geneva International Discussions (GID) are international talks established in October 2008 to address the security and humanitarian consequences of the Russo-Georgian War. The process grew out of the ceasefire agreement of 12 August 2008, brokered by the European Union and subsequently formalized by implementing measures on 8 September 2008 that provided for structured international discussions in Geneva.

The GID are co-chaired by the European Union, the United Nations, and the Organization for Security and Co-operation in Europe (OSCE). Participants include Georgia, Russia, the United States, and representatives from Abkhazia and South Ossetia. The discussions are normally held multiple times per year at the Palais des Nations in Geneva and have continued since 2008.

== Format ==
The talks are structured around two primary working groups: one addressing security and stability issues, including the implementation of the 2008 ceasefire and incident-prevention mechanisms, and the other addressing humanitarian issues such as freedom of movement, cultural heritage, and the status of internally displaced persons and refugees.

Each session is chaired jointly by representatives of the three co-chairing institutions, who issue communiqués summarizing discussions, positions, and any steps of agreement.

== Key issues ==
=== Non-use of force ===
Georgia pledged unilaterally in November 2010 not to use force, and it has repeatedly urged Russia to make a reciprocal commitment. Russia, Abkhaz, and South Ossetian participants have rejected Georgia’s formulation, arguing that Russia is not a formal party to the 2008 conflict and that legally binding agreements should be made directly between Tbilisi and the two entities.

External analysts see the non-use of force debate as emblematic of deeper political disagreements over legal status and recognition that the Geneva Talks cannot bridge without broader political progress outside the format.

=== Displaced persons and refugees ===
The question of return for displaced persons and refugees, primarily ethnic Georgians displaced from Abkhazia and South Ossetia, has been a persistent point of contention. The humanitarian working group raises these issues regularly, but parties have fundamentally different interpretations of the legal frameworks governing possible return and compensation.

=== Security incidents and boundary lines ===
The talks also address security incidents along the administrative boundary lines that separate Georgian-controlled territory from Abkhazia and South Ossetia, often in conjunction with the Incident Prevention and Response Mechanism. These exchanges focus on local de-escalation measures and procedures for reporting incidents to co-chairs.

== History ==
=== Establishment and early rounds (2008–2012) ===
The first Geneva discussion session convened on 15 October 2008. Early rounds focused on stabilizing the post-war environment and laying out mechanisms for bilateral and multilateral communication. Although some technical agreements were reached on incident reporting and humanitarian contacts, political disagreements intensified, particularly around non-use of force obligations and the return of displaced persons.

Many analysts note that the early GID rounds laid foundational practices for communication but did not generate durable political compromises on status or security arrangements.

=== Mid–2010s (2013–2019) ===
Throughout the 2010s, the process continued in regular sessions, with working groups maintaining dialogue on ceasefire implementation, IPRM engagement, and humanitarian matters. Observers frequently noted that while the GID served as a mechanism for sustained communication, it did not produce major political breakthroughs on the core disputes that separated the parties.

=== COVID-19 interruption and resumption (2020–present) ===
In 2020–2021, in-person sessions were disrupted by the global COVID-19 pandemic, and some rounds were postponed or convened in hybrid formats. By 2022, normal session schedules resumed, and the Geneva format continued its established pattern of quarterly or near-quarterly meetings.

Recent rounds have reiterated long-standing disagreements on core political issues while reaffirming the willingness of co-chairs and participants to maintain dialogue. In 2024 and 2025, communiqués by co-chairs continued to document differences on non-use of force and displaced persons, alongside detailed discussion of freedom of movement and humanitarian concerns.

== Assessment ==
Independent analysts characterize the Geneva International Discussions as a conflict-management forum rather than a conflict-resolution mechanism. The talks have provided a continuous platform for dialogue, helped institutionalize incident reporting and humanitarian discussion, and offered a predictable framework for periodic engagement. However, they have not delivered major political solutions on questions of territorial status, legally binding non-use of force commitments, or comprehensive return agreements for displaced persons.

Scholars point out that the persistence of the format reflects broader geopolitical dynamics that the talks themselves cannot resolve, including Russia-West competition, differences in legal interpretations of statehood, and divergent security priorities among participants.

== See also ==
- Russo-Georgian War
- Incident Prevention and Response Mechanism
- European Union Monitoring Mission in Georgia
