= Constitution of South Ossetia =

Fundamental law of the Republic of South Ossetia

The Constitution of the Republic of South Ossetia (Russian: Конститу́ция Респу́блики Ю́жная Осе́тия) was adopted by referendum on April 8, 2001. The previous constitution was adopted on November 2, 1993.

== Structure ==
The constitution consists of 93 articles arranged into nine chapters, followed by concluding and transitional provisions.

1. Fundamentals of the Constitutional System of the Republic of South Ossetia
2. Rights, Liberties, and Civil Duties of Man and Citizen
3. President of the Republic of South Ossetia
4. Parliament of the Republic of South Ossetia
5. Government of the Republic of South Ossetia
6. Judiciary of the Republic of South Ossetia
7. Office of the Prosecutor of the Republic of South Ossetia
8. Local State Administration and Self-Government
9. Constitutional Amendments and Revision of the Constitution of the Republic of South Ossetia
- Concluding and Transitional Provisions
