= 2022 South Ossetian presidential election =

- 10 April 2022 (first round); 8 May 2022 (second round)
- Turnout: 73.97% (▼5.66 pp)
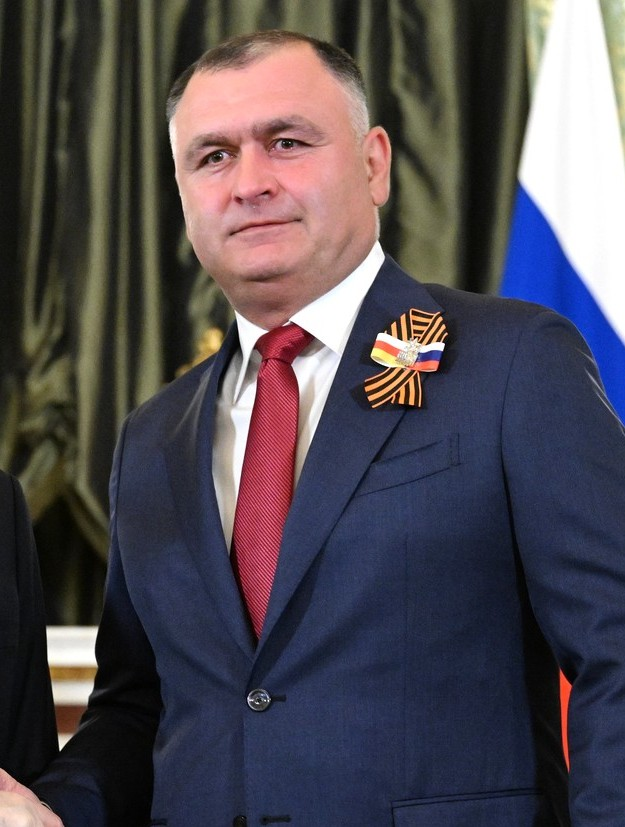

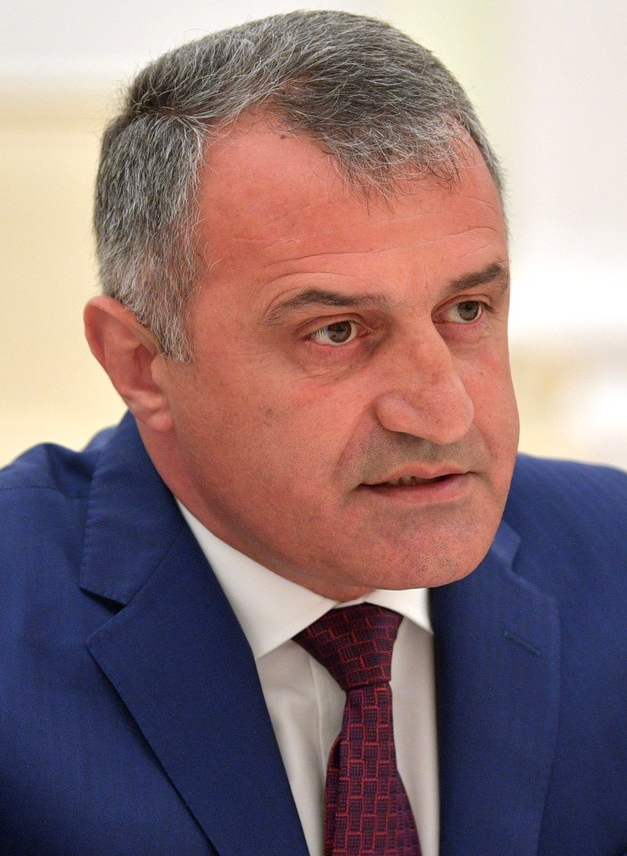
Nominee	Alan Gagloev	Anatoly Bibilov
Party	Nykhaz	United Ossetia
Popular vote	16,134	11,767
Percentage	56.08%	40.90%
President before election
Anatoly Bibilov
United Ossetia
Elected President
Alan Gagloev
Nykhaz

Presidential elections were held in the disputed territory of South Ossetia on 10 April 2022. As none of the presidential nominees obtained at least 50% of the votes, a runoff was held on 8 May 2022, between the top two candidates, Alan Gagloev and incumbent president Anatoly Bibilov.

Prior to the run-off, Gagloyev received endorsements from the three candidates eliminated in the first round, Alexandr Pliyev, Garri Muldarov, and Dmitry Tasoyev, heading into the runoff against incumbent president Anatoly Bibilov. Gagloyev went on to win with 56.1% of the vote, while Bibilov conceded defeat on the election night.

== Electoral system ==
The election is held using the two-round system; a candidate would be declared the winner if they received over 50% of the vote in the first round. As no candidate passed the 50% threshold, a run-off will be held. The President is elected for five years with one consecutive re-election possible.

According to the constitution, a citizen of South Ossetia not younger than 35 years old, fluent in the state languages (Ossetian and Russian) and permanently residing in South Ossetia for the last 10 years can be elected president of South Ossetia.

== Candidates ==
=== Registered ===
Candidate	Party	Offices held	Nominated	Registered
Anatoly Bibilov	United Ossetia	President of South Ossetia (2017–present)	8 February 2022	16 March 2022
Alan Gagloev	Nykhaz	Leader of Nykhaz (2020–present)	7 February 2022	16 March 2022
Garry Muldarov	Independent	Member of Parliament (2019–present)	7 February 2022	16 March 2022
Alexander Pliyev	People's Party	Leader of People's Party (2014–present); Deputy chairman of Parliament (2019–present)	5 February 2022	16 March 2022
Dmitry Tasoyev	Independent	Member of Parliament (2014–present)	9 February 2022	16 March 2022

=== Disqualified ===
- Rustam Dzagoyev, entrepreneur
- Ibrahim Gazseev, Minister of Defence (2016–2022)
- Geno Kajayev, artist
- Zelem Kaziyev, former police officer
- Vladimir Kelekhsaev, leader of Unity of the People
- Eduard Kokoity, former President of South Ossetia (2001–2011)
- Alan Kozonov, physician
- Aslan Kutarov, former director of Megafon-South Ossetia
- Alymbeg Pliyev, former Member of Parliament
- Vladimir Pukhayev, former defence ministry official
- David Sanakoev, Member of Parliament
- Taymuraz Tadtayev, teacher at South Ossetian university (Communist Party)
- Albert Valiyev, entrepreneur

=== Withdrew ===
- Alan Tekhov, former deputy prime minister of South Ossetia

== Campaign ==
On 25 February 2022, President Bibilov fired his defense minister and presidential candidate Ibrahim Gazseev.

If re-elected, Bibilov announced that a referendum on the unification of South Ossetia with Russia would be held in the near future. Gagloyev was critical of the proposal, since "public opinion on the subject is known." Bibilov was endorsed by Denis Pushilin (head of the breakaway Donetsk People's Republic), Lyudvig Chibirov (first president of South Ossetia) and representatives of the United Russia party.

On 14 April chair of the Central Election Commission Emilia Gagiyeva stated that the election runoff was scheduled for 28 April. As 28 April falls on a Thursday, the CEC sent a letter to the president asking him to declare it a day off. On 23 April the Supreme Court of South Ossetia revoked the CEC decision as it was in contrary with Article 10 of the Constitution of South Ossetia, which says that voting could be held only on Sunday.

== Results ==
On 10 April 2022, incumbent President Anatoly Bibilov lost the first round of the presidential election to Alan Gagloev, who received most votes. As none of the candidates received more than 50% of the vote, a requirement to win the presidency, a second round was called between Bibilov and Gagloyev. The three eliminated candidates declared their support for Gagloyev for the second round, which was scheduled for 8 May 2022, after initial confusion over its date. Gagloyev won this round with 56.2% of the vote. The Election Commission set the transfer of power on 24 May 2022.

According to local experts, Bibilov's defeat after an easy victory in 2017 can be explained by the number of scandals and abuse of power accusations that took place in recent years. There was for example the scandal around the Murder of Inal Djabiev, which caused civil unrest and a paralyzed parliament.

Candidate	Party	First round		Second round	
Candidate	Party	Votes	%	Votes	%
Alan Gagloev	Nykhaz	10,707	38.55	16,134	56.08
Anatoly Bibilov	United Ossetia	9,706	34.95	11,767	40.90
Aleksandr Pliyev	People's Party	3,434	12.37		
Garry Muldarov	Independent	2,592	9.33		
Dmitry Tasoyev	Independent	822	2.96		
None of the above		510	1.84	867	3.01
Total		27,771	100.00	28,768	100.00
Valid votes		27,771	95.57	28,768	97.77
Invalid/blank votes		1,286	4.43	655	2.23
Total votes		29,057	100.00	29,423	100.00
Registered voters/turnout		39,282	73.97	39,798	73.93
Source: CIKRUO, CIKRUO

== International reactions ==
- Azerbaijan – The South Caucasian nation continues to "support the sovereignty and territorial integrity of Georgia and does not recognize the so-called presidential election in Georgia's Tskhinvali region". The Foreign Ministry "considers it important to continue negotiations for a peaceful solution to the Tskhinvali issue in accordance with the norms and principles of international law."
- Czech Republic – The Ministry of Foreign Affairs of the Czech Republic does not recognize the presidential elections held in South Ossetia on 10 April.
- Germany – The German Government declared that it stands with Georgia and regards elections and their outcome as illegal.
- Moldova – The Ministry of Foreign Affairs and European Integration of Moldova expressed that it would not recognize the elections in South Ossetia and that it firmly supported Georgian territorial integrity.
- Romania – The Ministry of Foreign Affairs of Romania declared that it considered the South Ossetian elections as illegitimate and that it supports a peaceful settlement of protracted conflicts in Georgia that respects its internationally recognized borders.
