= State Information Agency =

- Logo
- Owner: South Ossetian Parliament
- Founder: South Ossetian Ministry of Information and Press
- President: May Kharebova
- Founded: 5 December 1995; 30 years ago
- Political alignment: South Ossetian government
- Language: English; Russian; Ossetian
- Headquarters: Tskhinvali
- Country: South Ossetia
- Website: cominf.org

The State Information Agency (Russian: Государственное информационное агентство), better known by its abbreviation RES (Russian: РEC), is the State media agency of the South Ossetian government.

== History ==
RES was founded on 2 December 1995 by the Ministry of Information and Press during the middle of an uneasy peace between Georgia and South Ossetia that lasted from 1992 to 2008, following the conclusion of the South Ossetia war. The agency was named after Mount Res, a mountain located on the border of North and South Ossetia, which was described by Ossetian poet Khajumar Pliyev as a symbol of Ossetian unity. The agency opened its website on 7 April 2003, which is one of the few free and readily available source of digital news in South Ossetia. The agency operated independently until 9 August 2016, when it was taken over by the Information and Press Committee of the Parliament of South Ossetia. As of 2024, the agency has been led by journalist May Kharebova.

Due to the government's direct control of the agency, its independence has been criticized, namely by the Freedom House for almost exclusively posting pro-government and pro-Russian stories and opinions. Despite this, the agency has occasionally been cited in Western Media such as Radio Free Europe as a reliable source for the opinions of the South Ossetian government.
