= People's Party of South Ossetia =

People's Party of South Ossetia Хуссар Ирыстоны Адӕмон парти Народная партия Южной Осетии სამხრეთ ოსეთის სახალხო პარტია
- Leader: Sergei Kharebov
- Headquarters: Tskhinvali
- Youth wing: Sunrise
- Ideology: Social liberalism Populism
- Colours: Orange
- Parliament: 5 / 34 (15%)

The People's Party of South Ossetia (Iron Ossetic: Хуссар Ирыстоны Адӕмон парти; Russian: Народная партия Южной Осетии; Georgian: ხალხის პარტიის სამხრეთ ოსეთის, romanized: khalkhis p'art'iis samkhret osetis) is a social liberal political party in South Ossetia, a partially recognized Caucasian republic, considered by most countries to be a part of Georgia. The party is known for being staunch supporters of former president Eduard Kokoity.

== History ==
=== Formation ===
Vremya reported that the party was formed in the build up to the 2004 South Ossetian parliamentary election under the guidance of Eduard Kokoity's administration to be a controlled opposition group to demonstrate to the world that South Ossetia has "free" elections with a plurality of political parties of differing ideologies. The People's Party self described ideology during its foundation is populism.

=== Pliyev-Kelekhsayev split ===
In the 2004 election, two members of parliament were elected under the People's Party's list, Kazimir Pliyev and Gennady Chochiev, that were not registered members of the party. After the party's congress on April 8 to choose candidates for the 2009 South Ossetian parliamentary election which also elected Roland Kelekhsayev as the party's chairman, the two held a rival congress on April 10 and issued their own slate of candidates and elected Pliyev as the new chairman of the party. Shortly after this second congress, armed uniformed men raided the Party's headquarters and seized documents opposing Pliyev's chairmanship. The central election commission registered their bid to stand for the 2009 election and barred the original Kelekhsayev led party as there cannot be two of the same party running. Kelekhsayev denied that this was a split in the party and instead insisted that the Pliyev and his supporters, who are members of The Union of Defenders of the Fatherland veterans group, staged a "coup". Kelekhsayev insists that the Pliyev led group is an entirely new parallel People's Party that despite having the same name and logo, has no ties to the actual party. Kelekhsayev petitioned the Prosecutor-General to intervene and open a legal case against Pliyev for the total disbandment of his organization. Justice Minister Murat Vaneyev responded that the Pliyev-Kelekhsayev split was an inter party affair which the Prosecutor-General has no authority over.

Opponents of Kokoity reported that the central election commissions move to recognize the Pliyev faction of the party over the Kelekhsayev faction was a tactical move as the Pliyev faction would not have the popular support that the Kelekhsayev faction would. Thus Kokoity would face no real opposition in the 2009 election. Despite this, Kelekhsayev appealed to Russian president Dmitry Medvedev to intervene on the party's behalf and sued the central election commission for barring his People's Party from participating in the election. Kelekhsayev also claimed to be fearing for his life and moved to Vladikavkav in North Ossetia during the dispute. Despite this nothing materialized and the Pliyev led party would be the party which contested the 2009 election The Pliyev led party won 10,345 votes, or 23.14% of the electorate coming in second place with 9 of the 34 seats in parliament, however, although Russian observers were allowed to attend, they were not allowed to enter polling places and actually observe the votes being either cast or counted and the opposition, including Kelekhsayev, decried the election as rigged.

The anti-government opposition faction would leave the party in protest shortly after the takeover in 2010, forming the new political party Iron, led by independent journalist Timur Tskhovrebov.

=== 2011 election ===
During the 2011 South Ossetian presidential election, party leader Kelekhsayev was barred from running, and even entering the country, as part of a law by President Kokoity preventing foreigners from entering the country ahead of the election. Kelekhsayev attempted to cross the border regardless and was beaten by police and arrested.

=== 2014 election ===
During the 2014 election the party was led by Alexander Pliev. Pliev, a veteran of the War in the Donbass would go on to be the Vice-Speaker of Parliament during the outbreak of the Russian Invasion of Ukraine and has repeatedly called Georgia and Ukraine fascist states. He also threatened military action when the Georgian police made a roadblock on the border near the village of Tsnelis.

=== 2019 election ===
During the 2019 South Ossetian parliamentary election, the party was led by Amiran Diakonov, a longtime member of parliament for the party, and were supported by Eduard Kokoity who gave a speech at a party rally.

=== 2024 election ===
During the campaign for the 2024 election the party would be led by Sergei Kharebov and, on April 6, 2024, merged with the political party Patriots of Alanya led by Dzambolat Tedeev. This caused Diakonov to announce his withdrawal from the party claiming that Patriots of Alanya was "politically opposite" to the People's Party. He was followed shortly by 2 more of the 5 elected members of parliament, bringing the party's parliamentary share down to just 2 MPs. Dzambolat Medoev joined the new party For Justice led by Harry Muldarov, and Robert Ostaev announced that he was going to become a political independent while Arsen Kvezerov announced he would be staying in the party, being the only MP besides Kharebov. This has led to a fracturing in the pro-Kokoity camp, as now the People's party has to compete with For Justice and Iron. The party was able to rebound in the 2024 election, electing 5 members to Parliament, gaining Vladimir Pukhaev, Alan Tadtaev, and Azamat Bekoev.

=== 2026 election ===
With the failure of the party to significantly increase its vote share in the parliamentary election, Patriots of Alanya would leave the party, and held a new party congress in 2026.
