= Konstantin Dzhussoev =

South Ossetian politician (born 1967)

- Константин Джуссойты; Константин Джуссоев
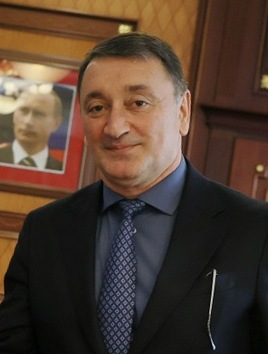
- Dzhussoev in 2022

16th Prime Minister of South Ossetia
- In office 20 June 2022 – 21 January 2026
- President: Alan Gagloyev
- Preceded by: Gennady Bekoyev
- Succeeded by: Dzambolyt Tadtayev

Personal details
- Born: 23 November 1967 (age 58)

Konstantin Khasanovich Dzhussoev (Russian: Константин Хасанович Джуссоев, Iron Ossetic: Джуссойты Хасаны фырт Константин, romanized: Džussojty Xasany fyrt Konstantin; born 23 November 1967) is a South Ossetian politician who was the Prime Minister of South Ossetia from 2022 to 2026. Prior to his tenure, he managed construction companies.

== Early life ==
Dzhussoev was born on 23 November 1967. Dzhussoev graduated in 1989 from the Tskhinvali Faculty of the Georgian Polytechnic Institute (GPI) with a degree in technology of machine tools and tools.

== Career ==
=== Business ===
From 1993 to 2011, Dzhussoev was the general director of the construction company Prilichny LLC, which operated solely in North Ossetia–Alania. In 2011, he became the General Director of the construction company Megapolis.

=== Political career ===
On 8 June 2022, President of South Ossetia Alan Gagloev submitted a proposal to the parliament to appoint Dzhussoev as the Prime Minister of South Ossetia. On 17 June, the Parliament of South Ossetia approved the candidacy of Dzhussoev with all 33 deputies voting in favor. On 20 June, Gagloev signed a decree to confirm his appointment. He had no experience in politics or government prior to his appointment.

From 5 to 8 June 2024, Dzhussoev led the South Ossetian delegation that took part in the St. Petersburg International Economic Forum.

On 30 October 2024 Dzhussoev, Minister of Finance Dzambolyt Tadtayev, and Minister of Construction Zaur Chochiev, announced that refurbishing and expanding utilities would be the government's top priority.

On January 21, 2026, Dzhussoev's government was dissolved by President Gagloev with now Deputy Prime Minister Dzambolat Tadtaev to take over. This was shortly after ₽2.5 billion was reported missing from Russian aid to South Ossetia. Members of the anti-Gagloev opposition, such as Communist Party MP Taimuraz Tadtaev, have alleged that Dzhussoev had embezzled the money by awarding inflated government contracts to friends and family.

== Personal life ==
Dzhussoev is married and is the father of a daughter.
