= 2026 national electoral calendar =

- Countries with national elections or referendums: Executive Legislative Executive and legislative Referendum Legislative and referendum Executive, legislative and referendum

This national electoral calendar for 2026 lists the national and federal elections held, and scheduled to be held, in 2026 in all sovereign states and their dependent territories. By-elections are excluded, though national referendums are included. Specific dates are given where these are known.

== January ==
- 11 January:
  - Benin, Parliament
  - Myanmar, Parliament (2nd phase)
- 15 January: Uganda, President and Parliament
- 18 January: Portugal, President (1st round)
- 25 January: Myanmar, Parliament (3rd phase)

== February ==
- 1 February: Costa Rica, President and Parliament
- 6 February: Tokelau, Parliament
- 8 February:
  - Japan, House of Representatives
  - Portugal, President (2nd round)
  - Thailand, House of Representatives and Constitutional referendum
- 11 February: Barbados, House of Assembly
- 12 February: Bangladesh, Parliament and Constitutional referendum
- 22 February: Laos, Parliament

== March ==
- 5 March: Nepal, House of Representatives
- 8 March:
  - Colombia, House of Representatives and Senate
  - Switzerland, Referendums
- 15 March:
  - Kazakhstan, Constitutional referendum
  - North Korea, Parliament
  - Republic of the Congo, President
  - Vietnam, Parliament
- 22 March: Slovenia, National Assembly
- 22–23 March: Italy, Constitutional referendum
- 24 March: Denmark, Parliament
- 26 March: Faroe Islands, Parliament

== April ==
- 4 April: Maldives, Constitutional referendum
- 10 April: Djibouti, President
- 12 April:
  - Benin, President
  - Hungary, Parliament
- 12–13 April: Peru, President (1st round), Chamber of Deputies and Senate
- 19 April: Bulgaria, Parliament
- 26 April: Central African Republic, National Assembly (second round)
- 30 April: Antigua and Barbuda, House of Representatives

== May ==
- 2 May: Niue, Parliament
- 12 May: Bahamas, House of Assembly
- 17 May: Cape Verde, Parliament
- 24 May: Cyprus, Parliament
- 30 May: Malta, Parliament
- 31 May:
  - Colombia, President (1st round)
  - Guinea, National Assembly

== June ==
- 1 June: Ethiopia, House of Peoples' Representatives
- 7 June:
  - Armenia, Parliament
  - Jersey, Parliament
  - Kosovo, Parliament
  - Peru, President (2nd round)
- 14 June: Switzerland, Referendums
- 21 June: Colombia, President (2nd round)
- 28 June: New Caledonia, Parliament

== July ==
- 2 July: Algeria, People's National Assembly
- 4 July: Slovakia, Referendum
- 19 July: São Tomé and Príncipe, President

== August ==
- 12 August: Cook Islands, Parliament
- 13 August: Zambia, President and Parliament
- 23 August: Kazakhstan, Kurultai
- 29 August: Iceland, Referendum
- 30 August: Guinea-Bissau, Constitutional referendum

== September ==
- 13 September: Sweden, Parliament
- 18 September: South Ossetia, President
- 18–20 September: Russia, State Duma
- 23 September: Morocco, House of Representatives
- 24 September: Isle of Man, House of Keys
- 27 September:
  - São Tomé and Príncipe, Parliament
  - Switzerland, Referendums

== October ==
- 3 October: Latvia, Parliament
- 4 October:
  - Bosnia and Herzegovina, Presidency and House of Representatives
  - Brazil, President (1st round), Chamber of Deputies and Senate
- 9–10 October: Czech Republic, Senate (1st round)
- 11 October: Slovenia, Referendums
- 16–17 October: Czech Republic, Senate (2nd round)
- 25 October:
  - Bulgaria, President (1st round)
  - Serbia, Parliament
  - Brazil, President (2nd round)
- 27 October: Israel, Knesset

== November ==
- 1 November: Bulgaria, President (2nd round)
- 3 November: United States, Senate and House of Representatives
- 5 November: Grenada, Parliament
- 7 November: New Zealand, Parliament
- 15 November: Cape Verde, President
- 21 November: Alderney, States
- 25 November: Sark, Chief Pleas
- 29 November:
  - Spain, Senate and Congress of Deputies
  - Switzerland, Referendums

== December ==
- 5 December: Gambia, President
- 6 December Northern Cyprus, Assembly of the Republic
- 9 December: Fiji, Constitutional referendum
- 13 December: Transnistria, President
- 27 December: Serbia, President

== Indirect elections ==
- 3–8 March: Iran, Supreme Leader
- 16 March, 18 June, and 16 October: India, Council of States
- 22 March: North Korea, President of the State Affairs
- 23 March: Laos, President
- 30 March: Myanmar, President
- 3 April: Myanmar, Vice President
- 7 April: Vietnam, President
- 11 April: Iraq, President
- 11 August: Hungary, President
- 20 August: Bangladesh, President
- 2 September: Estonia, President
- 27 September: France, Senate (series 2)
- 6 October: Kosovo, President
- 9 December: Switzerland, Federal Council

== See also ==
- 2026 local electoral calendar
- 2026 supranational electoral calendar
- List of elections in 2026
