= List of elections in 2026 =

This is a list of important elections that were or will be held in 2026.

- 2026 national electoral calendar
- 2026 local electoral calendar

== International ==
- International Criminal Court
  - 2026 International Criminal Court judges election, 7 to 17 December
- United Nations
  - 2026 United Nations Secretary-General selection
  - 2026 United Nations Security Council election, 3 June

== Africa ==
- Algeria
  - 2026 Algerian parliamentary election, 2 July
- Benin
  - 2026 Beninese parliamentary election, 11 January
  - 2026 Beninese presidential election, 12 April
- Cameroon
  - 2026 Cameroonian parliamentary election, 20 December
- Cape Verde
  - 2026 Cape Verdean parliamentary election, 17 May
  - 2026 Cape Verdean presidential election, 15 November
- Djibouti
  - 2026 Djiboutian presidential election, 10 April
- Ethiopia
  - 2026 Ethiopian general election, 1 June
- Gambia
  - 2026 Gambian presidential election, 5 December
- Guinea
  - 2026 Guinean parliamentary election, 31 May
- Guinea-Bissau
  - 2026 Guinea-Bissau constitutional referendum, 30 August
- Morocco
  - 2026 Moroccan general election, 23 September
- Nigeria
  - 2026 Nigerian gubernatorial elections
    - 2026 Ekiti State gubernatorial election, 20 June
    - 2026 Osun State gubernatorial election, 15 August
- Republic of the Congo
  - 2026 Republic of the Congo presidential election, 15 March
- São Tomé and Principe
  - 2026 São Toméan presidential election, 19 July
  - 2026 São Toméan parliamentary election, 27 September
- South Africa
  - 2026 South African municipal elections, 4 November
- Uganda
  - 2026 Ugandan general election, 15 January
- Western Sahara (Note: Limited or no international recognition.)
  - 2026 Sahrawi legislative election
- Zambia
  - 2026 Zambian general election, 13 August

== Americas ==
- Antigua and Barbuda
  - 2026 Antiguan general election, 30 April
- Barbados
  - 2026 Barbadian general election, 11 February
- Commonwealth of the Bahamas
  - 2026 Bahamian general election, 12 May
- Bolivia
  - 2026 Bolivian regional elections, 22 March (first round) & 19 April (second round)
- Brazil
  - 2026 Brazilian general election, 4 October (first round) & 25 October (second round)
  - 2026 Brazilian gubernatorial elections, 4 October (first round) & 25 October (second round)
- Canada
  - 2026 Quebec general election, 5 October
  - 2026 British Columbia municipal elections, 17 October
  - 2026 British Columbia general election, 24 October
  - 2026 Ontario municipal elections, 26 October
  - 2026 Prince Edward Island municipal elections, 2 November
  - 2026 Manitoba municipal elections, 28 October
  - 2026 New Brunswick municipal elections, 11 May
- Colombia
  - 2026 Colombian parliamentary election, 8 March
  - 2026 Colombian presidential election, 31 May (first round) & 21 June (second round)
- Costa Rica
  - 2026 Costa Rican general election, 1 February
- Dominica
  - 2026 Dominican general election, 16 December
- Grenada
  - 2026 Grenadian general election, 5 November
- Peru
  - 2026 Peruvian general election, 12–13 April (first round) & 7 June (second round)
  - 2026 Peruvian regional and municipal elections, 4 October
    - 2026 Lima municipal election
- Trinidad and Tobago
  - 2026 Tobago House of Assembly election, 12 January
- United States
  - 2026 United States elections, 3 November
    - 2026 United States gubernatorial elections
    - 2026 United States lieutenant gubernatorial elections
    - 2026 United States attorney general elections
    - 2026 United States House of Representatives elections
    - 2026 United States Senate elections
    - 2026 United States state legislative elections
    - 2026 United States local elections
    - 2026 United States secretary of state elections

== Asia ==
- Bangladesh
  - 2026 Bangladeshi general election, 12 February
  - 2026 Bangladeshi constitutional referendum, 12 February
  - 2026 Bangladeshi presidential election, 20 August
- India
  - 2026 elections in India
    - 2026 Assam Legislative Assembly election, 9 April
    - 2026 Kerala Legislative Assembly election, 9 April
    - 2026 Puducherry Legislative Assembly election, 9 April
    - 2026 Tamil Nadu Legislative Assembly election, 23 April
    - 2026 West Bengal Legislative Assembly election, 23–29 April
- Iran
  - 2026 Iranian supreme leader election, 3–8 March
- Iraq
  - 2026 Iraqi presidential election, 11 April
- Israel
  - 2026 Israeli legislative election, 27 October
- Japan
  - 2026 Japanese general election, 8 February
  - 2026 Japanese local elections
- Kazakhstan
  - 2026 Kazakh constitutional referendum, 15 March
  - 2026 Kazakh legislative election, 23 August
- Laos
  - 2026 Laotian parliamentary election, 22 February
- Malaysia
  - 2026 Johor state election, 11 July
  - 2026 Negeri Sembilan state election, 1 August
  - 2026 Malacca state election, 14 November
  - 2026 Sarawak state election, 12 December
- Myanmar
  - 2025–26 Myanmar general election, 11 January (second phase) & 25 January (third phase)
  - 2026 Myanmar presidential election, 3 April
- Nepal
  - 2026 Nepalese general election, 5 March
- North Korea
  - 2026 North Korean parliamentary election, 15 March
- Palestine
  - 2026 Palestinian local elections, 25 April
- Pakistan
  - 2026 Azad Kashmiri general election, 27 July (first phase), 2 August (second phase) & 10 August (third phase)
  - 2026 Gilgit Baltistan Assembly election, 7 June
- Philippines
  - 2026 Bangsamoro Parliament election, 14 September
- South Korea
  - 2026 South Korean by-elections, 3 June
  - 2026 South Korean local elections, 3 June
- Taiwan
  - 2026 Taiwanese local elections, 28 November
- Thailand
  - 2026 Thai general election, 8 February
  - 2026 Thai constitutional referendum, 8 February
  - 2026 Bangkok gubernatorial election, 28 June
  - 2026 Bangkok Metropolitan Council election, 28 June
- Vietnam
  - 2026 Vietnamese legislative election, 15 March

== Europe ==
- Alderney
  - 2026 Alderney general election, 21 November
- Armenia
  - 2026 Armenian parliamentary election, 7 June
- Austria
  - 2026 Graz local election, 28 June
- Bosnia and Herzegovina
  - 2026 Bosnian general election, 4 October
  - 2026 Federation of Bosnia and Herzegovina general election, 4 October
  - 2026 Republika Srpska general election, 4 October
- Bulgaria
  - 2026 Bulgarian parliamentary election, 19 April
  - 2026 Bulgarian presidential election, 25 October (first round) & 1 November (second round)
- Cyprus
  - 2026 Cypriot legislative election, 24 May
- Czech Republic
  - 2026 Czech municipal elections, 9–10 October
  - 2026 Czech Senate election, 9–10 October (first round) & 16–17 October (second round)
- Denmark
  - 2026 Danish general election, 24 March
  - 2026 Faroese general election, 26 March
- Estonia
  - 2026 Estonian presidential election, 2 September
- France
  - 2026 French municipal elections, 15 March (first round) & 22 March (second round)
    - 2026 Lyon municipal election
    - 2026 Marseille municipal election
    - 2026 Nice municipal election
    - 2026 Paris municipal election
    - 2026 Toulouse municipal election
  - 2026 French Senate election, 27 September
- Germany
  - 2026 Baden-Württemberg state election, 8 March
  - 2026 Rhineland-Palatinate state election, 22 March
  - 2026 Saxony-Anhalt state election, 6 September
  - 2026 Berlin state election, 20 September
  - 2026 Mecklenburg-Vorpommern state election, 20 September
- Hungary
  - 2026 Hungarian parliamentary election, 12 April
  - 2026 Hungarian presidential election, 11 August
- Iceland
  - 2026 Icelandic municipal elections, 16 May
  - 2026 Icelandic European Union membership negotiations referendum, 29 August
- Italy
  - 2026 Italian constitutional referendum, 22–23 March
  - 2026 Italian local elections, 24–25 May (first round) & 7–8 June (second round)
- Kosovo
  - 2026 Kosovan presidential election, 5 March (first attempt), 27 April (second attempt), 6–7 October (third attempt)
  - 2026 Kosovan parliamentary election, 7 June
- Latvia
  - 2026 Latvian parliamentary election, 3 October
- Isle of Man
  - 2026 Manx general election, 24 September
- Malta
  - 2026 Maltese general election, 30 May
- Moldova
  - 2026 Gagauz general election, 15 November (first round) & 29 November (second round)
- Montenegro
  - 2026 Montenegrin municipal elections, TBA
- Netherlands
  - 2026 Dutch municipal elections, 18 March
- Northern Cyprus
  - 2026 Northern Cypriot parliamentary election, 6 December
- Portugal
  - 2026 Portuguese presidential election, 18 January (first round) & 8 February (second round)
- Russia
  - 2026 Russian legislative election, 18–20 September
  - 2026 Russian regional elections, 20 September
- Sark
  - 2026 Sark general election, 25 November
- Serbia
  - 2026 Serbian local elections, 29 March
  - 2026 Serbian presidential election, 27 December
  - 2026 Serbian parliamentary election, 25 October
- Slovakia
  - 2026 Slovak local elections, 24 October
  - 2026 Slovak regional elections, 24 October
- Slovenia
  - 2026 Slovenian parliamentary election, 22 March
  - 2026 Slovenian local elections, 15 November (first round) & 29 November (second round)
- Spain
  - 2026 Aragonese regional election, 8 February
  - 2026 Castilian-Leonese regional election, 15 March
  - 2026 Andalusian regional election, 17 May
  - 2026 Spanish general election, 29 November
- Sweden
  - 2026 Swedish general election, 13 September
  - 2026 Swedish local elections, 13 September
- Transnistria
  - 2026 Transnistrian presidential election, 13 December
- United Kingdom
  - 2026 United Kingdom local elections, 7 May
  - 2026 Scottish Parliament election, 7 May
  - 2026 Senedd election, 7 May

== Oceania ==
- Australia
  - 2026 South Australian state election, 21 March
  - 2026 Victorian state election, 28 November
- Cook Islands
  - 2026 Cook Islands general election, 12 August
- Fiji
  - 2026 Fijian constitutional referendum, 9 December
- New Caledonia
  - 2026 New Caledonian legislative election, 28 June
- New Zealand
  - 2026 New Zealand general election, 7 November
- Niue
  - 2026 Niuean general election, 2 May
- Tokelau
  - 2026 Tokelauan general election, 5 February

== See also ==
- List of elections in 2025
- List of elections in 2027
