= 1997 Madrid NATO summit =

1997 NATO summit meeting in Madrid, Spain

NATO Summit Madrid 1997 1997 Madrid Summit
- Host country: Spain
- Date: 8–9 July 1997
- Cities: Madrid
- Venues: Institución Ferial de Madrid
- Follows: 1997 Paris summit
- Precedes: 1999 Washington summit
- Website: www.nato.int

The 1997 Madrid summit was a meeting of the heads of state and heads of government of the sixteen members of the North Atlantic Treaty Organization (NATO) and their partner countries held in Madrid, Spain, on 8–9 July 1997. It was the 15th NATO summit and the second in 1997, the previous one being held in Paris. The summit was notable for inviting three new members, Hungary, Poland, and the Czech Republic to join the alliance.

== Summit ==
=== Venue ===
The summit was held at the pavilions of the IFEMA fairgrounds. The government of Spain allocated 1.3 billion pesetas (€7.8 million) for the development of the summit.

=== NATO enlargement ===
The topic of enlargement was the main focus of the summit. The result of the summit was that Hungary, Poland, and the Czech Republic were invited to join NATO. Fellow Visegrád Group member Slovakia was excluded from this invitation. Slovakia had held a referendum on NATO membership in May 1997, but turnout in the referendum failed to achieve the required 50% of eligible voters and government sabotage was blamed, which in turn was viewed as one of a string of undemocratic measures taken by Prime Minister Vladimír Mečiar. A majority of NATO members reportedly supported France's proposal to also immediately invite Romania and Slovenia as members, but this was strongly opposed by U.S. President Bill Clinton, and even an "iron-clad guarantee" that they could be invited in two years time was watered-down in favor of an "open door" policy for new potential members. A main concern for the United States was the cost of potentially raising the military standards of the new Eastern European members. Estimates put this cost at as much as US$10 billion, which participants worried could lead to the treaty recognizing the new members being rejected by the Republican-held U.S. Senate.

=== Distinctive partnership ===
Additionally, a "Charter on a Distinctive Partnership" was signed between NATO and Ukraine, creating the NATO-Ukraine Commission and establishing relations between the two, and a declaration supporting peace efforts in Bosnia-Herzegovina was read and signed by participants.

== Participants ==
The official meetings were led by NATO Secretary General Javier Solana. One notable absence from the summit was Boris Yeltsin, President of Russia, which was instead represented by lower level bureaucrats.

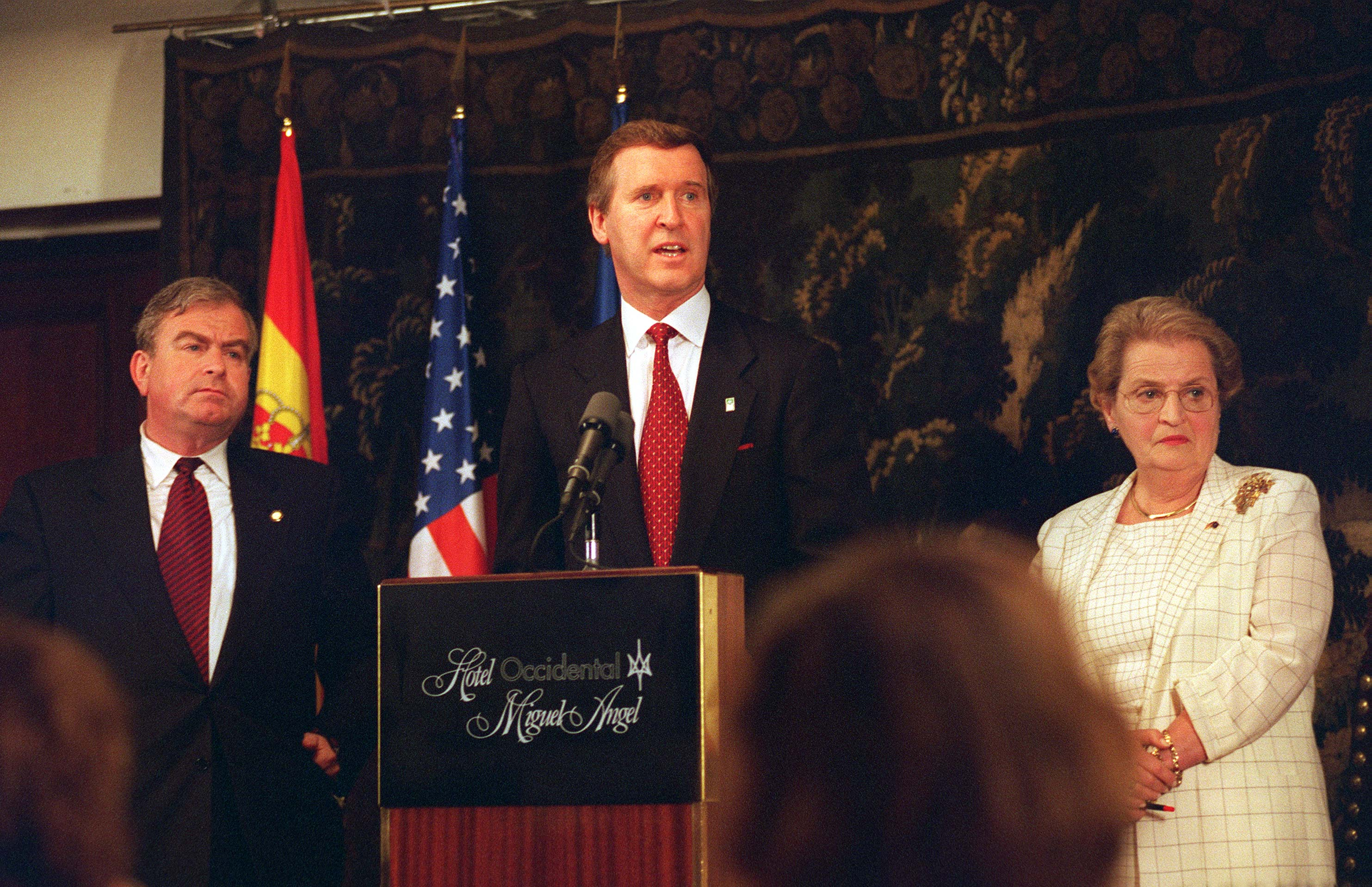
Secretary of Defense William Cohen, accompanied by National Security Advisor Samuel Burger (left) and Secretary of State Madeleine Albright (right), speaks during a press conference, held 8 July 1997, at the Miguel Ángel Hotel, Madrid, Spain. The three policy leaders talked to reporters about the historic decision, made earlier in the day at the NATO summit, to invite Poland, Hungary, and the Czech Republic, three former members of the now defunct Warsaw Pact, to begin accession negotiations to join the NATO alliance.

Key
Non-NATO member

Country or organization	Head of Delegation	Title
NATO	Javier Solana	Secretary General
Albania (Note: Albania, Armenia, Austria, Azerbaijan, Belarus, Bulgaria, Czech Republic, Estonia, Finland, Georgia, Hungary, Kazakhstan, Latvia, Lithuania, FYR Macedonia, Moldova, Poland, Romania, Russia, Slovakia, Slovenia, Sweden, Switzerland, Turkmenistan, Ukraine and Uzbekistan were not member states of NATO but were invited to attend and participate in the summit.)	Bashkim Fino	Prime Minister
Armenia	Alexander Arzumanyan	Minister of Foreign Affairs
Austria	Viktor Klima	Chancellor
Azerbaijan	Heidar Aliev	President
Belarus	Alexander Lukashenko	President
Belgium	Jean-Luc Dehaene	Prime Minister
Bulgaria	Petar Stoyanov	President
Canada	Jean Chrétien	Prime Minister
Czech Republic	Václav Havel	President
Denmark	Poul Nyrup Rasmussen	Prime Minister
Estonia	Lennart Meri	President
Finland	Martti Ahtisaari	President
France	Jacques Chirac	President
Georgia	Eduard Shevardnadze	President
Germany	Helmut Kohl	Chancellor
Greece	Costas Simitis	Prime Minister
Hungary	Gyula Horn	Prime Minister
Iceland	Davíð Oddsson	Prime Minister
Italy	Romano Prodi	Prime Minister
Kazakhstan	Auyeskhan Kyrbasov	Ambassador
Latvia	Guntis Ulmanis	President
Lithuania	Algirdas Brazauskas	President
Luxembourg	Jean-Claude Juncker	Prime Minister
FYR Macedonia	Kiro Gligorov	President
Moldova	Petru Lucinschi	President
Netherlands	Wim Kok	Prime Minister
Norway	Thorbjørn Jagland	Prime Minister
Poland	Aleksander Kwaśniewski	President
Portugal	António Guterres	Prime Minister
Romania	Emil Constantinescu	President
Russia	Valery Serov	Deputy Chairman of the Government
Slovakia	Vladimír Mečiar	Prime Minister
Slovenia	Janez Drnovšek	Prime Minister
Spain	José María Aznar (host)	Prime Minister
Sweden	Göran Persson	Prime Minister
Switzerland	Adolf Ogi	Federal Councillor
Turkey	Süleyman Demirel	President
Turkmenistan	Çary Niýazow	Ambassador to France
Ukraine	Leonid Kuchma	President
United Kingdom	Tony Blair	Prime Minister
United States	Bill Clinton	President
Uzbekistan	Abdulaziz Kamilov	Minister of Foreign Affairs

== Other events ==
On the evening of 8 July 1997, King Juan Carlos I and Queen Sofía welcomed the heads of State, of Government, of Delegations and their companions at the Royal Palace, where they hosted a state dinner.

== See also ==
- 2022 Madrid summit
