= 2026 Slovak referendum =

Slovak political reform referendum in 2026

- 4 July 2026
- Outcome: Proposals failed as voter turnout was below 50%
- 1. Do you agree with the abolition of the so-called lifetime pension—for example, for Robert Fico—as provided for in Section 24a(1)(b) of Act No. 120/1993 Coll. on the Salaries of Certain Constitutional Officials of the Slovak Republic, as currently in force?

Results
Choice	Votes	%
Yes	658,937	94.61%
No	37,553	5.39%
Valid votes	696,490	98.76%
Invalid or blank votes	8,737	1.24%
Total votes	705,227	100.00%
Registered voters/turnout	4,369,989	16.14%
- 2. Do you agree that the Special Prosecutor's Office and the National Criminal Agency should be reinstated?

Results
Choice	Votes	%
Yes	650,490	93.82%
No	42,876	6.18%
Valid votes	693,366	98.32%
Invalid or blank votes	11,861	1.68%
Total votes	705,227	100.00%
Registered voters/turnout	4,369,989	16.14%
- Results by county

A two-part referendum was held in Slovakia on 4 July 2026. The questions were on whether to cancel life payments for leaders after their terms expire, and whether to reestablish the Special Prosecutor's Office and the National Criminal Agency.

Although a very large majority of those that voted supported the proposals, it, nevertheless, was not adopted as less than 50% of all eligible voters in the country exercised their right to vote in the referendum, a requirement under current Slovak law.

With a turnout of 16%, it was the second lowest in a Slovak referendum since the 1997 Slovak referendum.

== Background ==
The referendum came from a petition organised by the Democrats party which was signed by more than 350,000 citizens.

== Questions ==
The two questions on the referendum paper was posed as:

1. Súhlasíte so zrušením tzv. doživotnej renty, napríklad, pre Roberta Fica, ustanovenej v § 24a ods. 1 písm. b) zákona č. 120/1993 Z. z. o platových pomeroch niektorých ústavných činiteľov Slovenskej republiky v aktuálnom znení?
"Do you agree with the abolition of the so-called lifetime pension—for example, for Robert Fico—as provided for in Section 24a(1)(b) of Act No. 120/1993 Coll. on the Salaries of Certain Constitutional Officials of the Slovak Republic, as currently in force?"
2. Súhlasíte s tým, aby boli obnovené Úrad špeciálnej prokuratúry a Národná kriminálna agentúra?
"Do you agree that the Special Prosecutor's Office and the National Criminal Agency should be reinstated?"

== Results ==
Polling stations were opened from 07:00 to 22:00. As only 16% of the electorate turned out to vote while a majority of votes and a minimum of 50% turnout was required to pass the proposals, the referendum failed.

=== Question 1 ===
Choice	Votes	%
For	658,937	94.61
Against	37,553	5.39
Total	696,490	100.00
Valid votes	696,490	98.76
Invalid/blank votes	8,737	1.24
Total votes	705,227	100.00
Registered voters/turnout	4,369,989	16.14
Source: Volby

=== Question 2 ===
Choice	Votes	%
For	650,490	93.82
Against	42,876	6.18
Total	693,366	100.00
Valid votes	693,366	98.32
Invalid/blank votes	11,861	1.68
Total votes	705,227	100.00
Registered voters/turnout	4,369,989	16.14
Source: Volby

Results of the "yes" vote as a percentage of registered voters by district

First question

Second question

== See also ==
- List of elections in 2026
