= 2026 Swiss Federal Council election =

By-election for the Swiss cabinet

2026 Swiss Federal Council by-election
- 9 December 2026

1 of the 7 Federal Councillors 123 votes to win
- Parmelin's seat
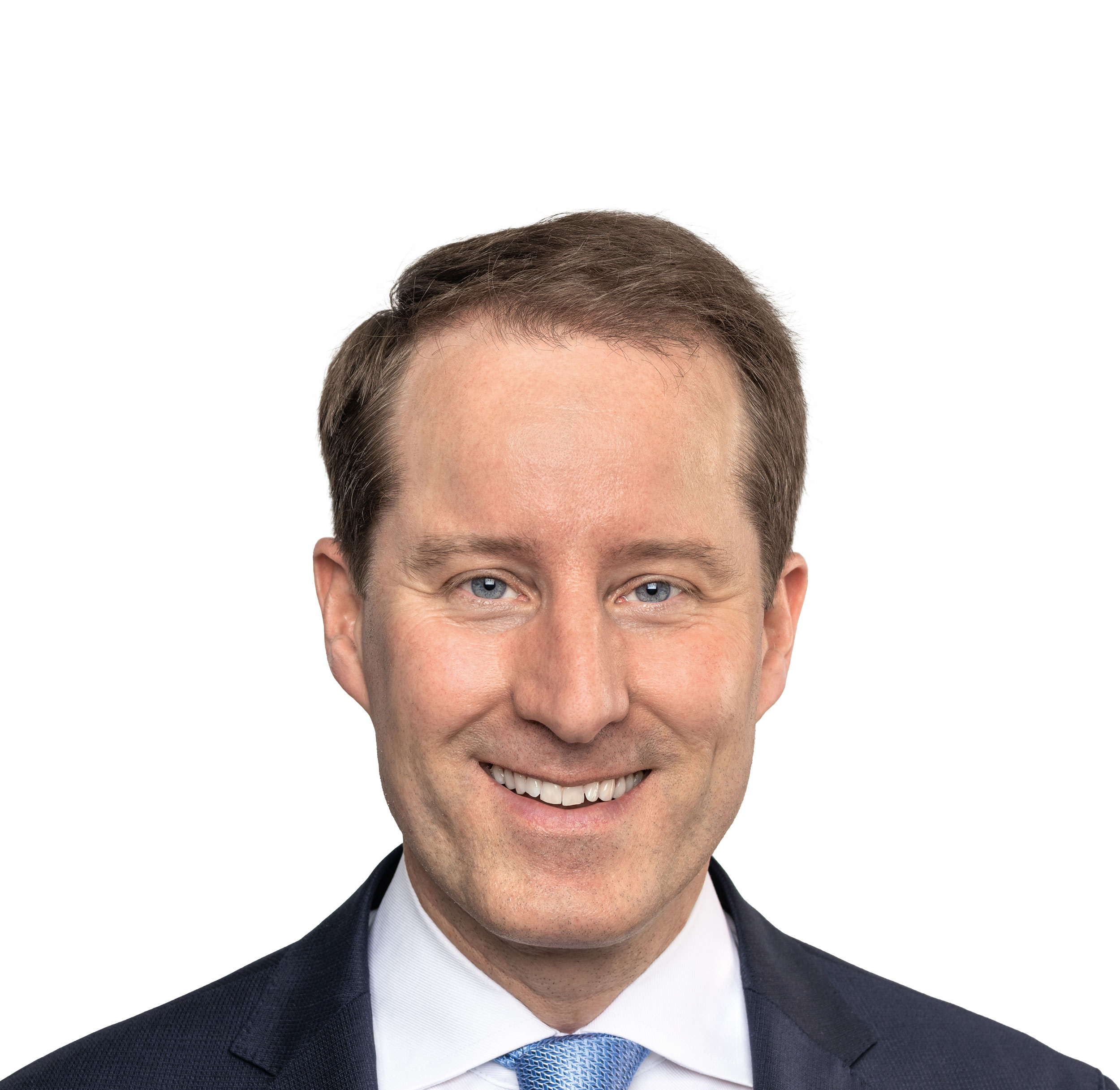

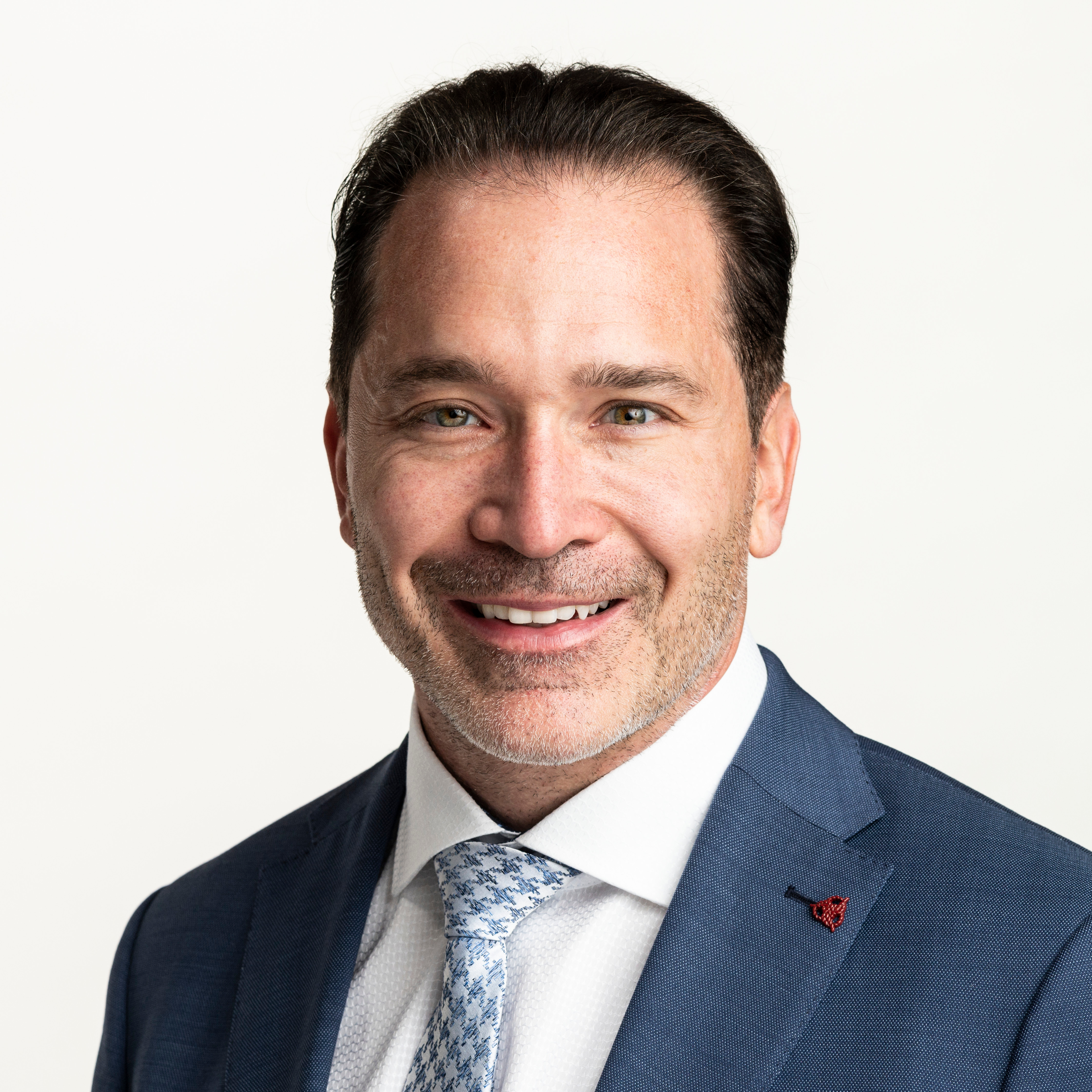
Candidate	Thomas Aeschi	Michael Graber
Party	Swiss People's	Swiss People's

The announcement of President Guy Parmelin's resignation from the Federal Council on 2 October, effective on 31 December, triggered a by-election that will take place on 9 December 2026. The Swiss People's Party (SVP/UDC) announced that candidates had until 23 October to nominate themselves as a candidate.

According to an informal agreement between the major political parties known as the magic formula, the only nominated candidates were from the SVP. His successor will take over the leadership of the Federal Department of Economic Affairs, Education and Research.

== Candidates ==
On 20 November, the SVP announced it would put forth two candidates: National Councillors Thomas Aeschi of Zug, the party's parliamentary group leader, and Michael Graber of Valais. Aeschi was previously one of three SVP-nominated candidates for the seat vacated by Eveline Widmer-Schlumpf in the 2015 Federal Council election, and finished runner-up to Parmelin.

Aeschi's nomination was relatively secure through six rounds of voting, but party members told SRG SSR that there was a tight race for the other selection: Graber defeated councillor Pierre-Alain Schnegg of Bern by two votes on the final ballot, after Céline Amaudruz of Geneva dropped out as the third-placed candidate. Concerns followed that the native French-speaking Parmelin, who hails from Vaud, would be replaced by a native German speaker and tip the regional and linguistic balance of the council. Councillors from the Greens, Green Liberals, Social Democrats, Liberals, and Centre all told SRG SSR that they would be open to voting for someone other than the two candidates because of this; they were also described as unfit for the Federal Council due to their hardline political positions and too similar to one another to present a meaningful choice. Green parliamentary group leader Greta Gysin went a step further and called them "unelectable", and stated that her party would not invite either candidate to a hearing.
