= 2026 supranational electoral calendar =

List of international elections held in 2026

The 2026 international electoral calendar lists elections, appointments, and leadership selection processes scheduled to be held in 2026 within international and transnational organizations. These include intergovernmental, supranational, and non-governmental bodies, such as international institutions, religious organizations, and sports organizations, whose governance structures extend beyond individual states. It does not include national elections or subnational electoral events within individual countries. Specific dates are given where these are known.

== January ==
- 28 January: Church of England, Archbishop of Canterbury, election

== February ==
- 28 February: Anglican Diocese of Ottawa, Bishop election

== March ==
- 5 March: Global Anglican Future Conference (GAFCON), establishment of the Global Anglican Council and election of its leadership

== April ==
- 12 April: Andean Parliament, Peru
- 26 April: Central Tibetan Administration, General Election

== May ==
- 11 May: Georgian Orthodox Church, Patriarch

== June ==
- 2 June: United Nations, President of the General Assembly for the eighty-first session
- 3 June: United Nations, Security Council, 2027–2028 rotation

== December ==
- 7 to 17 December: International Criminal Court, six judges

== Unknown date ==
- United Nations, Secretary-General
