= 2026 Montenegrin municipal elections =

The 2026 Montenegrin municipal elections are scheduled for 2026.
