= National Transitional Council (Guinea-Bissau) =

Temporary legislature body

National Transitional Council / Transitional National Council (Conselho Nacional de Transição)

Type
- Type: Unicameral or Lower house

History
- Founded: 5 December 2025

Leadership
- Speaker: Tomás Djassi; Since 12 December 2025
- Secretary General: Samuel Fernandes; Since 12 December 2025

Structure
- Seats: 65 to 66 members
- Political groups: 10 to 15 members: Military (High Military Command)

Constitution
- Transitional Charter as the Constitution of Guinea-Bissau is suspended

The National Transitional Council (NTC) also called National Transition Council or Transitional National Council is the transitional legislative body established by the High Military Command for the Restoration of National Security and Public Order on 5 December 2025.
