= 2026 Guinea-Bissau constitutional referendum =

- 30 August 2026
- "Do you agree with the entry into force of the new constitution approved by the National Transition Council?"

Results
Choice	Votes	%
Yes	383,116	70.42%
No	160,954	29.58%
Valid votes	544,070	95.00%
Invalid or blank votes	28,642	5.00%
Total votes	572,712	100.00%
Registered voters/turnout	914,428	62.63%
- Results by region

A constitutional referendum on expanding presidential powers was held on 30 August 2026 by the ruling military junta in Guinea-Bissau. The proposal was accepted with a majority of 70%.

== Background ==
One month and some weeks after the coup d'état on 26 November 2025, the National Transitional Council approved constitutional changes on 14 January 2026, in which the president would also become the head of government. Horta Inta-A Na Man announced on 6 July 2026, that there will be a constitutional referendum in which the people can endorse the approved planned constitutional changes by the NTC.

== Proposals ==
- Allowing the president to appoint and dismiss the prime minister and cabinet, to create or abolish government ministries, chair the Council of Ministers, dissolve parliament in the event of a grave political crisis and dismiss the government under certain circumstances.
- Shrink parliament from 102 to 65 seats and cut the number of electoral constituencies from 29 to 12.
- Require candidates for president to have lived in Guinea-Bissau for the previous five years and pay a 50 million West African CFA franc ($90,000) deposit.
- Require political parties to have a minimum of 5,000 members, including at least 300 in each region, before they can sponsor a presidential candidate.
- Establishment of a Constitutional Court.

== Campaign ==
Around 915,000 people were eligible to vote in the referendum.

Opposition parties called for a boycott of the referendum, with the PAIGC warning that the proposed constitution would weaken the prime minister, the government, political parties and the legislature. The head of the Guinea-Bissau Human Rights League, Bubacar Turé, said "no" supporters were not authorised to campaign, and that the draft constitution was made without consultations from political parties, civil-society organisations, or even traditional and religious leaders.

== Results ==
The National Electoral Commission announced the results on September 1, were 70% of voters voted in favour of the new constitution and 30% opposed. With the majority accepting it, Guinea-Bissau has a new constitution.

Choice	Votes	%
For	383,116	70.42
Against	160,954	29.58
Total	544,070	100.00
Valid votes	544,070	95.00
Invalid votes	16,923	2.95
Blank votes	11,719	2.05
Total votes	572,712	100.00
Registered voters/turnout	914,428	62.63
Source: Jornal Nô Pintcha
