= Auyeskhan Kyrbasov =

Kazakhstani diplomat (1937–2014)

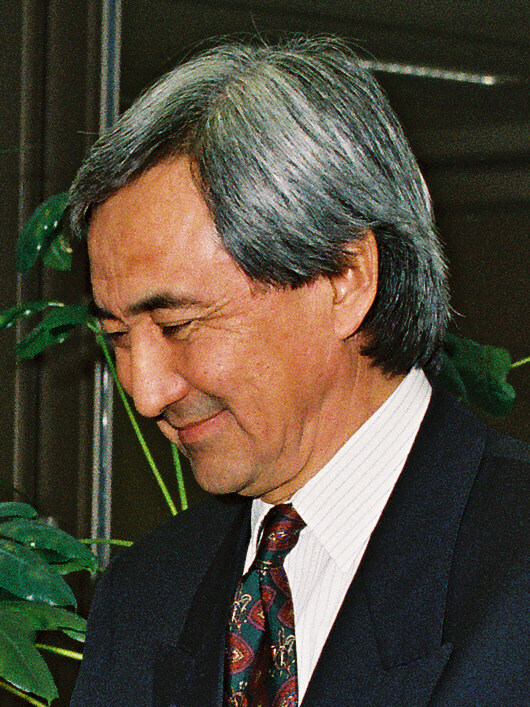
Kyrbasov in 1994

Auyeskhan Makatayuly Kyrbasov (Kazakh: Әуесхан Мақатайұлы Қырбасов, IPA: [æwʲɪsˈχɑːn mɑqɑtʰɑj.o̙ˈɫɯ qɯrˈbɑsɯp]; Russian: Ауесхан Макатаевич Кырбасов; 28 May 1937 – 3 April 2014) was a Kazakhstani diplomat and one of the first ambassadors of independent Kazakhstan.

== Early life and education ==
Kyrbasov was born on 28 May 1937 in the village of Shiien, Dzhambul District, Alma-Ata Region, Kazakh SSR, Soviet Union. In 1959, he graduated from the Kazakh Agricultural Institute with a degree in mechanical engineering. He later completed his education at the Higher Commercial School of the Academy of National Economy under the Council of Ministers of the USSR in 1990.

== Early career ==
From 1959 to 1972, Kyrbasov worked at the Alma-Ata Heavy Machinery Plant as a design engineer and later as a leading designer. His work in production and engineering led to him being awarded the State Prize of Kazakhstan in Science and Technology and the honorary title of "Honored Inventor of the Kazakh SSR".

== Government service ==
Between 1972 and 1983, Kyrbasov held senior positions in the apparatus of the Council of Ministers of the Kazakh SSR and the Central Committee of the Communist Party of Kazakhstan, where he oversaw the mechanical engineering industry of the Republic. During this period, the construction and reconstruction of the Pavlodar Tractor Plant, Alma-Ata Heavy Machinery Plant, the "Porshen" Plant, and the "Kazakhselmash" and "Tselinogradselmash" associations were carried out.

From 1983 to 1993, he headed the Chamber of Commerce and Industry of Kazakhstan, which at that time was the only organization in the Republic carrying out foreign economic activities.

== Diplomatic career ==
After Kazakhstan gained independence, Kyrbasov was transferred to the diplomatic service of the Republic. By the Decree of the President of the Republic dated 30 July 1993, he was appointed Ambassador Extraordinary and Plenipotentiary of the Republic of Kazakhstan to the Kingdom of Belgium.

Starting from 1994, he simultaneously became:

- Head of the Representation of the Republic of Kazakhstan to the European Union
- Ambassador Extraordinary and Plenipotentiary of Kazakhstan to the Kingdom of the Netherlands
- Ambassador Extraordinary and Plenipotentiary of Kazakhstan to the Grand Duchy of Luxembourg
- Head of the Representation of Kazakhstan to the NATO

He led these diplomatic missions until 1998. During his tenure, on 31 July 1996, the "Agreement on Security between the Republic of Kazakhstan and the North Atlantic Treaty Organization" was concluded.

== Later career ==
After returning to Kazakhstan in 1999, Kyrbasov was appointed Head of the Representation of the Ministry of Foreign Affairs of the Republic of Kazakhstan in Almaty. From September 2001, he served as Ambassador at Large.

In July 2004, at the founding meeting, he was elected Chairman of the Council of the newly created "Association of Diplomats of Kazakhstan", being one of the initiators of the establishment of this organization.

== Honors and awards ==
By the Decree of the President of the Republic of Kazakhstan dated 19 October 1995, he was awarded the highest diplomatic rank of "Ambassador Extraordinary and Plenipotentiary of the Republic of Kazakhstan".

His awards and honors include:

- Certificate of Honor of the Supreme Soviet of the Kazakh SSR
- Honored Inventor of the Kazakh SSR
- State Prize of the Kazakh SSR in Science and Technology
- Medal named after Nazir Tyuryakulov "For contribution to the development of foreign policy of the Republic of Kazakhstan"
- Honored Worker of Kazakhstan
- Honored Worker of the Diplomatic Service of the Republic of Kazakhstan
- Corresponding Member of the Engineering Academy of the Republic of Kazakhstan
- Chairman of the Council "Association of Diplomats of Kazakhstan"

== Personal life ==
Kyrbasov was married and had a son.

== Death ==
Auyeskhan Kyrbasov died on 3 April 2014 in Almaty, Kazakhstan.
