= 2026 Slovenian referendum =

A four-question non-binding referendum was held in Slovenia on 11 October 2026. The questions were:

- Overturning the Law on Parliamentary Investigation that was adopted by the National Assembly in May 2026
- Making social assistance conditional on carrying out of community service
- Limiting voting rights in local elections to Slovenian and EU citizens
- Abolition of the RTV SLO licence fee

== Results ==
Question	For		Against		Invalid/ blank	Total votes	Registered voters	Turnout	Outcome
Question	Votes	%	Votes	%	Invalid/ blank	Total votes	Registered voters	Turnout	Outcome
Law on Parliamentary Investigation	449,824	48.64	474,950	51.36	5,209	929,983	1,697,366	54.80	Rejected
Social assistance	560,354	60.48	366,136	39.52	3,425	929,915	1,697,366	54.80	Approved
Local election voting rights	511,588	55.23	414,642	44.77	3,679	929,909	1,697,366	54.80	Approved
Abolition of RTV SLO licence fee	462,099	49.84	464,999	50.16	2,921	930,019	1,697,366	54.80	Rejected
Source: Volitve
