= 2026 Thai constitutional referendum =

- 8 February 2026
- Do you approve that there should be a new constitution?
- Voting system: Simple majority of valid votes
- Outcome: Approved

Results
Choice	Votes	%
For	21,621,638	60.16%
Against	11,241,653	31.28%
No opinion	3,074,330	8.55%
Valid votes	35,937,621	97.47%
Invalid or blank votes	932,583	2.53%
Total votes	36,870,266	100.00%
Registered voters/turnout	52,933,610	69.65%
- Results by province

A constitutional referendum was held in Thailand alongside the general election on 8 February 2026 to ask voters whether they approve beginning the process of writing a new constitution to replace the current one adopted in 2017. It was approved by 60% of voters with a 69% turnout.

Caretaker Prime Minister Anutin Charnvirakul officially began the process of holding a referendum on 23 December 2025 and the date was officially announced by a Royal Gazette published on 2 January 2026. The date of the referendum was chosen to coincide with the 2026 general election for the efficient use of public funds.

== Background ==
Following the 2006 coup that ousted Prime Minister Thaksin Shinawatra, the ruling military junta of the Council for National Security repealed the 1997 "People's" Constitution and introduced an interim constitution. The 1997 constitution was Thailand's most democratic constitution: it created a bicameral legislature where both houses were directly and democratically elected, and the prime minister was elected solely by the National Assembly. The new 2007 constitution was drafted and then adopted after Thailand's first referendum was held on 19 August 2007. A majority (57.81%) of voters were in favour of the new constitution, whilst opposition was concentrated in the north and northeast where Thaksin and his parties were popular. The referendum was followed by the return of elections in December. However, the new referendum was also seen as an attempt to contain the influence of Thaksin and his allies. Between 2007 and 2014, Thaksin-friendly politicians became Prime Ministers and in 2011 his sister, Yingluck Shinawatra, was elected prime minister. A political crisis led to her removal in 2014, followed by a coup d'état in 2014 that replaced the 2007 constitution with the 2014 interim constitution. The ruling military junta of the National Council for Peace and Order began drafting a new constitution and criticism of it was banned. The 2016 referendum saw 61.4% of voters approve of it, and it was adopted in 2017. The 2017 constitution had no clause that allows for a complete rewrite. Attempts to amend or rewrite the 2017 constitution have existed since its adoption.

== Constitutional reform ==
=== Rulings by the Constitutional Court ===
Following the removal of Prime Minister Paetongtarn Shinawatra by the Constitutional Court on 29 August 2025, the conservative Bhumjaithai Party entered into negotiations with the progressive People's Party to secure their support to back Anutin Charnvirakul as prime minister. In an agreement between the two parties, the People's Party agreed to support Anutin on the terms that Anutin dissolve the House within four months, Bhumjaithai must maintain a minority coalition, and must also initiate the process of amending the 2017 constitution and hold a referendum if required. The referendum on whether to amend the constitution would then lead to the establishment of an elected constitution drafting assembly and must be held no later than the general election. If the Constitutional Court did not find a referendum necessary, an elected drafting assembly would be established.

On 10 September, the Constitutional Court voted 6-1 that three referendums are required to begin the process of drafting a new constitution, and members of the Constitution Drafting Assembly (CDA) cannot be directly elected. The ruling followed a petition by Wan Muhamad Noor Matha, speaker of the House of Representatives, under Section 210 (1)(2). In a 5–2 vote, the court found that the House had the authority to begin the charter rewrite process but this must be preceded by a referendum asking voters if they approve of a rewrite. In the three referendums required by the court, the first should ask whether a new constitution should be drafted, the second will seek public opinion on the principles and methods of the rewrite, whilst the third will ask if voters approve of the new constitution. The first and second referendums may be combined.

=== Constitutional Amendment bill ===
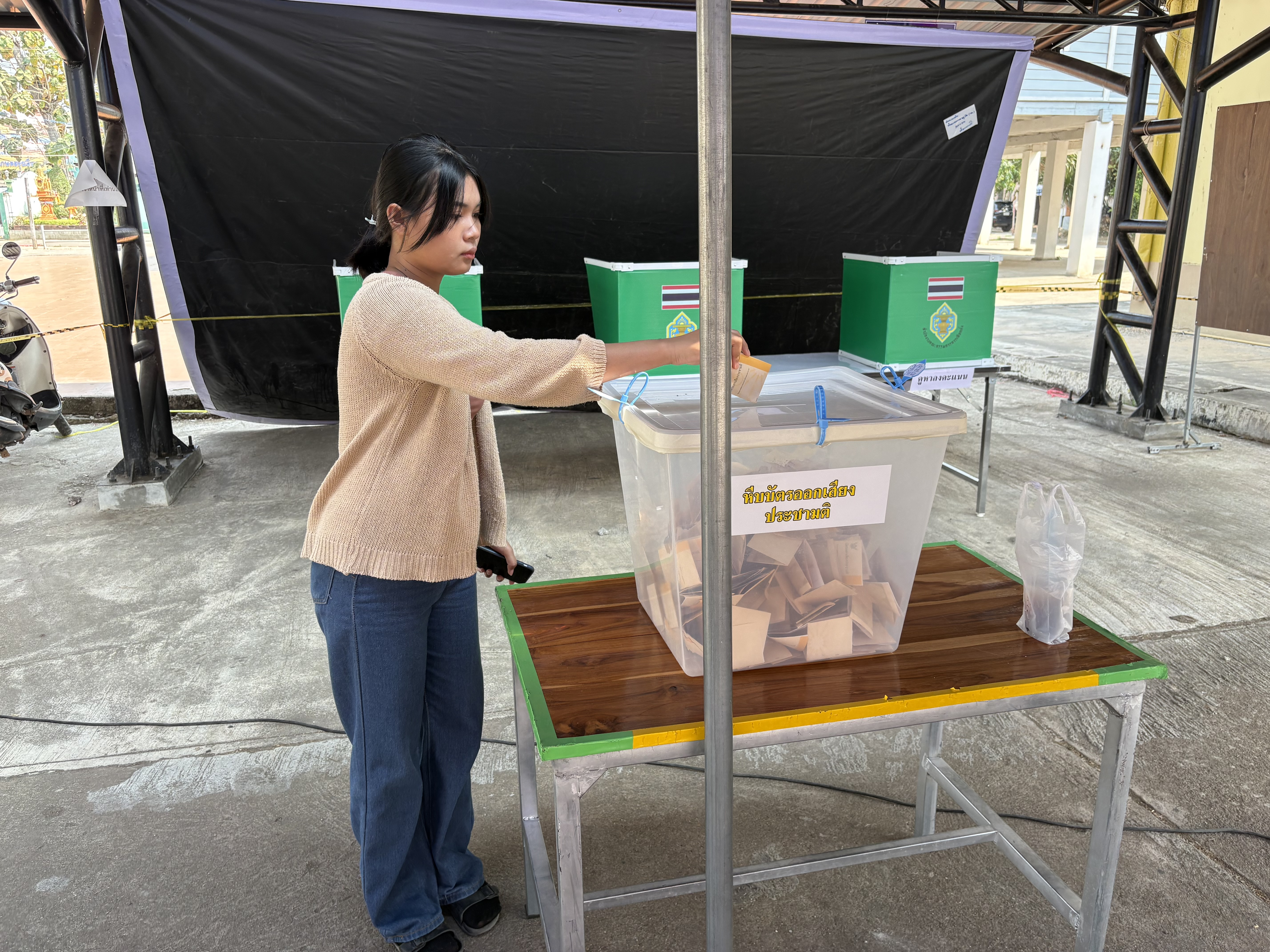
A citizen casting ballot for the referendum at a polling station in Sawankhalok, Sukhothai province on 8 February 2026

Following the Court's ruling, the People's Party, Pheu Thai and Bhumjaithai submitted their own separate draft constitutional amendment bills to Parliament to amend Article 256 of Chapter 15 and to add an extra chapter to allow for a new constitution to be drafted. Chapter 15 describes the process to amend the constitution. Parliament met on October 14 and 15 to discuss the three proposals. Pheu Thai's version proposed the establishment of a CDA with 151 members. 100 members were to be chosen by Parliament from an election of 300 candidates, whilst the other 51 would be nominated and chosen by Parliament and the Cabinet. A drafting committee of 27 members would then be formed and would consist of 14 members from the CDA and 13 from other fields like law and political science. After draft amendments are completed, they would be submitted to Parliament for approval before a public referendum would confirm them. The People's Party's version proposed that a CDA of 35 members selected by Parliament from a list of 70 people elected by voters be formed along an advisory council of 100 elected members with the goal of gathering public opinion to advise the CDA. Bhumjaithai's version proposes that the CDA should be made of 99 members made up of 77 selected by Parliament from a list so each province is represented by one member and 22 experts in law, political science, and other relevant fields. Members of the drafting committee would then be selected by the CDA. It also reduces the number of Senate votes needed to pass amendments from a third to a fifth of senators. The Bhumjaithai and Pheu Thai bills prohibit changes to the political system and state structure described in Chapters 1 and 2, whilst the People's Party contains elements from those two chapters.

On October 15, Parliament (both the House and Senate) voted to pass the People's Party and Bhumjaithai's bills in their first readings. The People's Party's bill received 460 votes from MPs and 108 from Senators (total of 568), whilst the Bhumjaithai's bill received 462 votes from MPs and 167 votes from Senators (total of 629). Pheu Thai's bill received 561 votes, only 60 coming from the Senate. It failed to pass as it failed to gain the support of a third of Senators. A 43 member committee of 12 Senators and 31 MPs from eight parties (People's Party, Pheu Thai, Bhumjaithai, Kla Tham, Democrat, Thai Sang Thai, Palang Pracharath, Chart Thai Pattana, and Prachachart) was then formed to scrutinise the bills, with the People's Party's bill being the main draft. The committee held its first meeting on October 19 and elected Nutthawut Buaprathum, party-list MP for People's Party, as chairman. The three deputy chairmen were Chawengsak Rengpaiboon, MP for Bhumjaithai; Tawee Sodsong, MP for Prachachart, and Senator Premsak Piayura. The panel was empowered to recommend changes to the draft bills to ensure they met the requirements stated by the Constitutional Court. By the end of November, the committee finished its review of the bill. At the same time, the cabinet approved a special parliamentary session for December 10 and 11 for a second reading on the bill.

On December 10, Parliament voted to approve establishing a 35 member CDA and a 35 member public participation committee. Parliament also voted 328 to 266 to use the "20 pick 1" formula to choose members. The formula stipulates that a group of 20 MPs and Senators each nominates one member for the CDA. Pheu Thai were the main opponents of the formula. Parliament later voted 494 to 1 to approve the first referendum question on whether there should be a new constitution and the question was sent to the Cabinet. On the amendment to Article 256/28, Parliament voted to reject the committee's proposal that future amendments on the constitution should be approved by a simple majority of a joint-sitting to preserve the Senate's one-third veto power. The article was rejected by several MPs from Bhumjaithai and the governing coalition. The People's Party then began the process to call a vote of no confidence. Before a vote could be called, Anutin dissolved the House of Representatives and began the process for holding a general election in 2026 on December 12. On December 19, the cabinet approved the referendum question and forwarded it to the Electoral Commission.

== Positions ==
=== Political parties ===
==== Parliamentary parties ====
Party	Stance	Notes and references
Bhumjaithai Party	Support	Party leader Anutin Charnvirakul has stated in various interviews such as THE STANDARD that he and most candidates of the party would vote in favour of the referendum. However, the party would not support any attempts to amend or alter Chapters 1 and 2 of the constitution on the state and monarchy. He also stated that Bhumjaithai was not the main force behind the referendum and was "broadly comfortable" with the 2017 constitution whilst saying they understood arguments for a "people's constitution" not drafted by a military junta.
Democrat Party	Support	The Democrat Party has voiced its support for the referendum. However, party leader Abhisit Vejjajiva has stated that the Democrats would not support any attempts to amend or alter Chapters 1 and 2 of the constitution.
Fair Party	Support	
Palang Pracharath Party	Oppose	
People's Party	Support	The People's Party has been among the most vocal supporters for a new constitution, arguing that a full rewrite of the constitution is necessary to rid Thailand of the political legacy of past military coups and juntas.
Pheu Thai Party	Support	Pheu Thai has voiced its support for a new constitution, but will seek to retain Chapters 1 and 2.
Prachachat Party	Support	
Thai Sang Thai Party	Support	
United Thai Nation Party	Oppose	Party leader Pirapan Salirathavibhaga stated the United Thai Nation Party opposed removing the 2017 constitution as it contained valuable provisions and that a rewrite could allow disqualified politicians to re-emerge. Additionally, prime ministerial candidate Atthawit Suwanpakdee has stated that the 2017 constitution should be amended and not "torn up".

==== Non-parliamentary parties ====
Party	Stance	Notes and references
Economic Party	Oppose	
Movement Party	Support	
Rak Chart Party	Oppose	Jade Donavanik, a legal scholar who advised the assembly that drafted the 2017 constitution and a prime ministerial candidate of the Rak Chart Party, stated that the party opposed writing a new constitution but supported revisions to specific sections on the basis it was more cost-effective.
Thai Pakdee Party	Oppose	Party leader Warong Dechgitvigrom stated the Thai Pakdee Party opposed rewriting a new constitution on the basis it would weaken anti-corruption mechanisms, the independence of public organisations, and lead to greater external influence and polarisation.

=== Organisations ===
On 6 February 2026, a group of 80 pro-democracy and human rights organisations issued a joint statement in support of the referendum, saying that the current constitution lacked any democratic legitimacy. Such groups included the Anti-Corruption People's Network, Campaign Committee for Democracy, the Human Rights Lawyers Association, the People's Movement for a Just Society, and the People's Network for Elections.

== Opinion polls ==
Fieldwork date	Polling firm	Sample	For	Against	No opinion
31 Jan – 6 Feb 2026	NIDA	2,895	54.68%	31.54%	13.78%

== Results ==
Choice	Votes	%
For	21,621,638	60.16
Against	11,241,653	31.28
No opinion	3,074,330	8.55
Total	35,937,621	100.00
Valid votes	35,937,621	97.47
Invalid/blank votes	932,583	2.53
Total votes	36,870,204	100.00
Registered voters/turnout	52,933,610	69.65
Source: Election Commission of Thailand

=== By province ===
Province	Do you approve that there should be a new constitution?						Valid votes	Invalid/ blank	Total votes	Registered voters	Turnout
Province	For		Against		No opinion		Valid votes	Invalid/ blank	Total votes	Registered voters	Turnout
Province	Votes	%	Votes	%	Votes	%	Valid votes	Invalid/ blank	Total votes	Registered voters	Turnout
Ang Thong	93,007	57.44	51,600	31.87	17,315	10.69	161,922	5,490	167,412	224,050	74.72
Ayutthaya	326,496	62.73	144,251	27.71	49,746	9.56	520,493	13,777	534,270	677,786	78.83
Bangkok	2,354,809	68.44	922,056	26.80	163,994	4.77	3,440,859	42,100	3,482,959	4,504,341	77.32
Chai Nat	96,186	54.96	57,176	32.67	21,634	12.36	174,996	6,326	181,322	262,516	69.07
Chachoengsao	265,099	60.07	134,266	30.42	41,981	9.51	441,346	11,577	452,923	591,384	76.59
Chanthaburi	159,021	53.23	105,224	35.22	34,479	11.54	298,724	7,565	306,289	432,807	70.77
Chonburi	608,169	64.51	263,224	27.92	71,292	7.56	942,685	19,605	962,290	1,298,034	74.13
Kanchanaburi	270,535	58.27	141,535	30.48	52,221	11.25	464,291	15,253	479,544	657,313	72.96
Lopburi	228,357	58.52	122,809	31.47	39,041	10.01	390,207	13,356	403,563	596,426	67.66
Rayong	281,828	64.38	117,594	26.86	38,309	8.75	437,731	8,556	446,287	621,825	71.77
Ratchaburi	290,817	55.96	169,303	32.58	59,582	11.46	519,702	15,745	535,447	697,185	76.80
Nakhon Nayok	91,560	55.99	54,946	33.60	17,028	10.41	163,534	4,753	168,287	212,999	79.01
Nakhon Pathom	366,440	62.53	162,787	27.78	56,785	9.69	586,012	14,230	600,242	756,742	79.32
Nonthaburi	529,615	65.66	227,706	28.23	49,246	6.11	806,567	11,026	817,593	1,073,611	76.15
Pathum Thani	536,527	68.69	190,760	24.42	53,823	6.89	781,110	13,056	794,166	1,012,746	78.42
Prachuap Khiri Khan	154,216	50.57	118,612	38.90	32,106	10.53	304,934	8,639	313,573	437,499	71.67
Prachinburi	171,390	59.72	86,948	30.30	28,657	9.99	286,995	7,000	293,995	403,186	72.92
Sa Kaeo	147,607	53.26	100,845	36.39	28,670	10.35	277,122	8,527	285,649	443,720	64.38
Saraburi	238,417	61.50	111,184	28.68	38,087	9.82	387,688	10,755	398,443	518,984	76.77
Samut Prakan	554,484	68.65	196,319	24.31	56,922	7.05	807,725	13,979	821,704	1,125,059	73.04
Samut Sakhon	215,684	64.34	89,646	26.74	29,881	8.91	335,211	8,049	343,260	462,730	74.18
Samut Songkhram	59,008	54.46	36,687	33.86	12,660	11.68	108,355	2,902	111,257	156,144	71.25
Sing Buri	65,043	54.53	40,827	34.23	13,413	11.24	119,283	3,602	122,885	167,134	73.52
Suphan Buri	283,743	59.70	138,201	29.08	53,343	11.22	475,287	15,188	490,475	677,735	72.37
Trat	57,383	49.32	46,730	40.17	12,225	10.51	116,338	3,037	119,375	176,946	67.46
Phetchaburi	148,338	50.59	111,135	37.90	33,726	11.50	293,199	9,799	302,998	396,340	76.45
Central Region	8,593,779	62.99	3,942,371	28.90	1,106,166	8.11	13,642,316	293,892	13,936,208	18,585,242	74.99
Chumphon	102,199	34.94	163,992	56.06	26,326	9.00	292,517	6,335	298,852	409,636	72.96
Krabi	109,495	42.00	125,048	47.97	26,161	10.03	260,704	7,069	267,773	370,572	72.26
Nakhon Si Thammarat	320,161	37.94	450,001	53.32	73,780	8.74	843,942	21,520	865,462	1,231,333	70.29
Narathiwat	278,461	68.84	98,044	24.24	27,999	6.92	404,504	15,700	420,204	596,927	70.39
Pattani	251,490	70.18	82,708	23.08	24,152	6.74	358,350	12,655	371,005	525,628	70.58
Phang Nga	59,039	40.08	72,739	49.38	15,517	10.53	147,295	4,053	151,348	211,116	71.69
Phatthalung	128,895	39.83	166,089	51.32	28,658	8.85	323,642	8,361	332,003	422,325	78.61
Phuket	118,997	52.78	88,364	39.19	18,095	8.03	225,456	4,645	230,101	329,566	69.82
Ranong	34,008	38.29	45,711	51.46	9,105	10.25	88,824	2,377	91,201	143,308	63.64
Satun	83,199	48.48	69,306	40.39	19,106	11.13	171,611	5,030	176,641	246,016	71.80
Songkhla	375,395	44.66	391,590	46.59	73,484	8.74	840,469	22,357	862,826	1,125,479	76.66
Surat Thani	244,457	39.56	318,580	51.56	54,896	8.88	617,933	13,157	631,090	846,661	74.54
Trang	141,443	38.99	181,505	50.03	39,821	10.98	362,769	8,544	371,313	509,911	72.82
Yala	181,451	67.42	66,549	24.73	21,134	7.85	269,134	9,407	278,541	395,764	70.38
Southern Region	2,428,690	46.64	2,320,226	44.56	458,234	8.80	5,207,150	141,210	5,348,360	7,364,242	72.63
Chiang Mai	736,450	72.17	206,269	20.21	77,663	7.61	1,020,382	26,970	1,047,352	1,348,717	77.66
Chiang Rai	455,193	70.02	142,089	21.86	52,848	8.13	650,130	19,536	669,666	948,644	70.59
Lampang	271,714	66.78	100,696	24.75	34,456	8.47	406,866	12,328	419,194	602,050	69.63
Lamphun	177,175	68.72	56,853	22.05	23,791	9.23	257,819	7,398	265,217	333,229	79.59
Phrae	159,343	66.28	63,799	26.54	17,259	7.18	240,401	6,427	246,828	360,150	68.53
Nan	174,366	66.45	66,984	25.53	21,051	8.02	262,401	6,254	268,655	389,210	69.03
Mae Hong Son	84,900	65.72	33,927	26.26	10,348	8.01	129,175	3,938	133,113	191,270	69.59
Tak	152,417	57.81	84,243	31.95	26,994	10.24	263,654	9,729	273,383	421,137	64.92
Uttaradit	137,493	59.48	70,855	30.65	22,806	9.87	231,154	6,043	237,197	366,710	64.68
Phitsanulok	260,851	57.28	149,189	32.76	45,365	9.96	455,405	11,669	467,074	690,652	67.63
Kamphaeng Phet	198,677	55.62	122,203	34.21	36,352	10.18	357,232	12,273	369,505	569,348	64.90
Nakhon Sawan	301,282	56.38	179,410	33.57	53,725	10.05	534,417	16,969	551,386	838,211	65.78
Sukhothai	173,006	56.84	98,713	32.43	32,659	10.73	304,378	9,064	313,442	477,243	65.68
Phetchabun	265,006	55.46	162,537	34.02	50,277	10.52	477,820	16,144	493,964	784,983	62.93
Phichit	147,150	55.24	92,715	34.80	26,521	9.96	266,386	8,535	274,921	427,501	64.31
Uthai Thani	76,626	49.46	61,643	39.79	16,660	10.75	154,929	4,047	158,976	261,839	60.72
Phayao	180,043	66.99	68,216	25.38	20,501	7.63	268,760	8,076	276,836	383,185	72.25
Northern Region	3,951,692	62.91	1,760,341	28.03	569,276	9.06	6,281,309	185,400	6,466,709	9,394,079	68.84
Amnat Charoen	97,669	53.64	66,281	36.40	18,137	9.96	182,087	5,203	187,290	302,692	61.87
Buriram	351,070	48.57	302,949	41.91	68,845	9.52	722,864	24,504	747,368	1,260,649	59.28
Chaiyaphum	338,843	62.36	155,466	28.61	49,041	9.03	543,350	18,140	561,490	904,844	62.05
Loei	199,574	60.91	96,768	29.53	31,330	9.56	327,672	9,772	337,444	508,734	66.33
Kalasin	311,062	63.91	136,738	28.09	38,939	8.00	486,739	13,817	500,556	791,214	63.26
Khon Kaen	621,106	66.36	244,714	26.15	70,085	7.49	935,905	27,595	963,500	1,457,774	66.09
Maha Sarakham	319,507	65.70	130,227	26.78	36,605	7.53	486,339	12,840	499,179	775,036	64.41
Mukdahan	125,279	66.02	48,833	25.74	15,633	8.24	189,745	5,166	194,911	280,363	69.52
Nakhon Ratchasima	822,668	59.32	427,091	30.80	137,109	9.89	1,386,868	39,553	1,426,421	2,149,672	66.36
Nakhon Phanom	229,103	65.29	91,721	26.14	30,076	8.57	350,900	10,020	360,920	573,929	62.89
Nong Bua Lamphu	155,659	65.78	61,304	25.91	19,679	8.32	236,642	6,873	243,515	408,537	59.61
Nong Khai	162,984	66.57	62,737	25.63	19,103	7.80	244,824	7,417	252,241	413,265	61.04
Roi Et	413,096	66.80	157,321	25.44	48,000	7.76	618,417	15,759	634,176	1,054,200	60.16
Sakon Nakhon	351,808	63.47	153,064	27.61	49,415	8.92	554,287	12,759	567,046	924,019	61.37
Sisaket	408,749	58.81	224,351	32.28	61,952	8.91	695,052	23,345	718,397	1,168,509	61.48
Surin	343,549	55.29	222,233	35.77	55,513	8.94	621,295	19,438	640,733	1,095,942	58.46
Ubon Ratchathani	524,808	56.42	316,254	33.99	89,166	9.59	930,228	27,411	957,639	1,497,330	63.96
Udon Thani	487,848	66.62	184,714	25.23	59,669	8.15	732,231	19,433	751,664	1,258,242	59.74
Yasothon	172,643	64.36	73,218	27.30	22,368	8.34	268,229	7,353	275,582	432,648	63.70
Bueng Kan	140,221	67.24	51,089	24.50	17,217	8.26	208,527	5,032	213,559	332,448	64.24
North Eastern Region	6,577,246	61.34	3,207,073	29.91	937,882	8.75	10,722,201	311,430	11,033,631	17,590,047	62.73
Overseas voters	70,231	82.97	11,642	13.75	2,772	3.27	84,645	651	85,296	—	—
Total	21,621,638	60.16	11,241,653	31.28	3,074,330	8.55	35,937,621	932,583	36,870,266	52,933,610	69.65
Source: Election Commission of Thailand

== See also ==
- 2016 Thai constitutional referendum
- 2007 Thai constitutional referendum
