= Simple majority =

Simple majority may refer to:

- A simple majority, being the implied term when referring to something as just a majority, unless specified otherwise, a voting requirement of more than half of all votes cast
- Plurality (voting), a voting requirement of more votes cast for a proposition than for any other option
- First-past-the-post voting, the single-winner version of an election with plurality voting and one vote per person

== See also ==
- Supermajority, a voting requirement of a specified level of support which is greater than the "one half" threshold used for a simple majority.
