= 1997 Slovak referendum =

Failed referendums

A referendum was held in Slovakia on 23 May and 24 May 1997. Voters in Slovakia were asked four separate questions: on whether the country should join NATO, whether nuclear weapons should be allowed in Slovakia, whether foreign military bases should be allowed in Slovakia, and whether the President should be elected directly. The government left the last question off the ballot paper, leading to both referendums failing to meet the legally required turnout threshold.

== Questions ==
The first question, on joining NATO, was government-sponsored. It was hypothetical as, under Prime Minister Vladimír Mečiar, Slovakia had progressively become a pariah state, and NATO were unlikely to issue an invitation. The second and third questions were related to the first, with the questions deliberately expressed in a manner that deterred 'yes' voters.

Are you in favour of Slovakia's entry into NATO?

Are you for placing nuclear weapons on the territory of Slovakia?

Are you for locating foreign military bases on the territory of Slovakia?

The fourth referendum question was pushed by the opposition. Originally, the president was elected by a three-fifths majority in the National Council, but the polarisation of Slovak politics under Mečiar meant that no candidate could muster 60% support. With Michal Kováč's term running out in March 1998, Mečiar's opponents sought to avoid a vacant presidency, which would allow Mečiar to consolidate his power. By adopting a run-off presidential election, with the two best-placed candidates progressing to the next round, they could unite those opposed to Mečiar in the second round, and defeat him.

Do you agree that the president of the Slovak Republic should be directly elected by the citizens of the Slovak Republic according to the enclosed proposal for a constitutional law?

== Boycott ==
By holding the referendums on the same day, President Kováč sought to increase the chance of overcoming the 50% quorum for the vote to be legally binding. However, the government interpreted a ruling by the Constitutional Court tendentiously, asserting that, because the referendum could not be binding on the constitution, and because the appendix to the fourth question of the referendum did not contain its detailed explanation as the "referendum law" requested (no. 564/1992), the presidential election vote should be cancelled: despite the court's own ruling that this interpretation does not and may not have any influence on this referendum and that referendums already accepted by the President could not be cancelled for that reason. The government distributed ballot papers without the fourth question, but some district electoral commissioners refused to accept ballot papers that did not include it.

As a result, the opposition urged its supporters to boycott the referendum, which was successful, with only 9.5% of people turning out. The turnout fell far short of the 50% required, and the referendum was declared invalid. On 26 May, in protest at the government's handling of the referendum, the Foreign Minister, Pavol Hamžík, resigned. In July 1997, NATO confirmed that they were inviting the Czech Republic, Hungary, and Poland to become members, but not Slovakia. A week later, the European Commission did likewise: refusing to invite Slovakia to join the European Union, due to failing the 'democratic criteria', but inviting the three surrounding countries, Estonia, and Slovenia.

== See also ==
- 1997 Madrid NATO summit
