= Greta Gysin =

Swiss politician (born 1983)

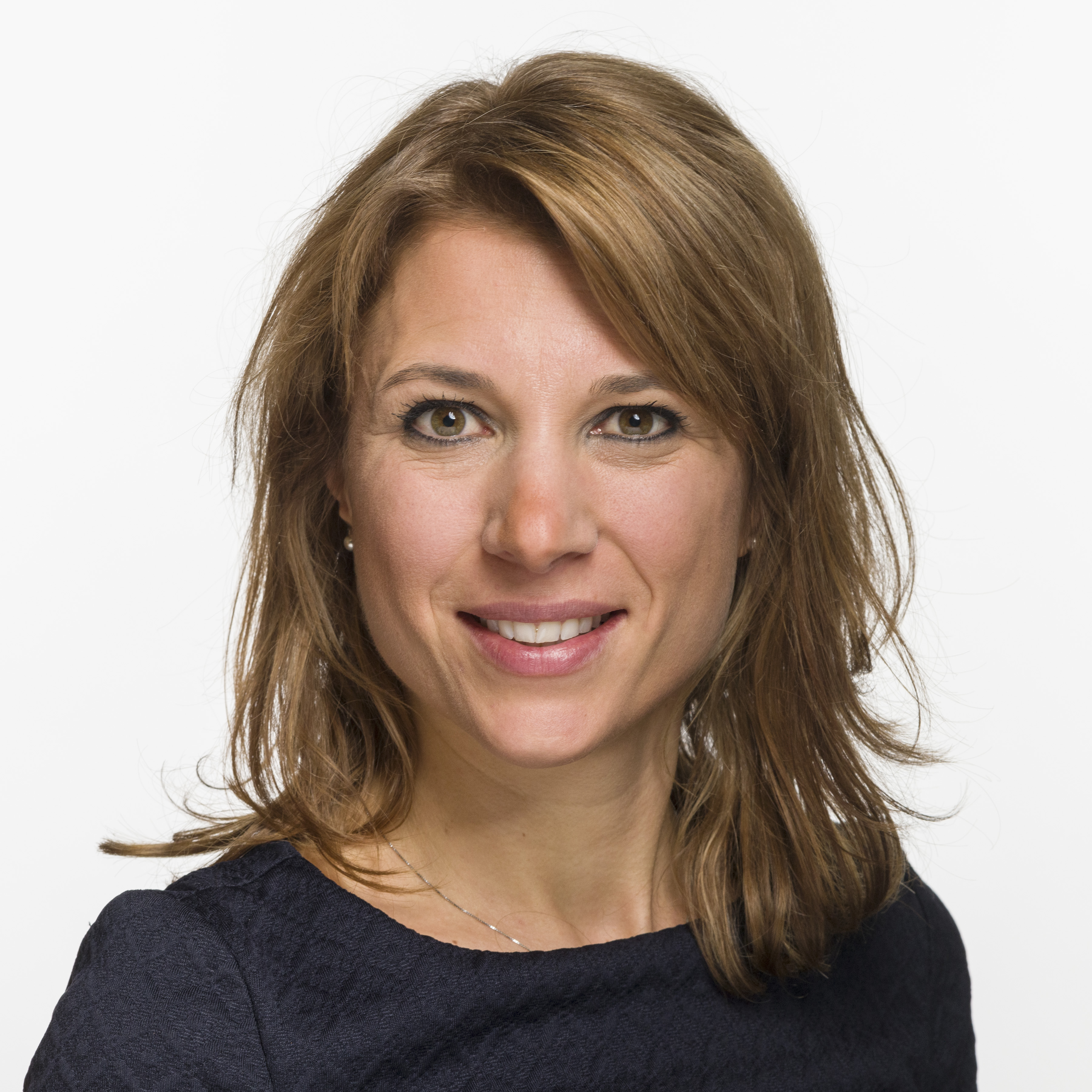

Member of the National Council
- Incumbent
- Assumed office 2 December 2019
- Constituency: Ticino

Member of the Grand Council of Ticino
- In office 2 May 2007 – 17 May 2015

Personal details
- Born: 6 October 1983 (age 42) Locarno, Ticino, Switzerland
- Party: Green Party

Greta Gysin (born 6 October 1983) is a Swiss politician of the Green Party (GPS). Since 2019, she has been a member of the National Council.

== Early life and education ==
Greta Gysin was born on 6 October 1983 in Locarno, in the canton of Ticino. Her parents came originally from Oltingen, in the canton of Basel-Landschaft. She has a twin brother and an older sister. She grew up in Rovio, in the Lugano District. She studied political science, sociology and history at the University of Zurich, from which she graduated in 2011.

She first held a position as project manager in the field of renewable energies, before being hired in 2016 by the public services union Transfair. She left this job at the end of 2019 after she was elected to the National Council.

== Political career ==
Gysin founded of the Ticino section of the Young Greens and the coordinated the Swiss Young Greens from 2009 to 2011.

At the age of 21, Gysin was elected to the Municipal (legislative) Council of Rovio, although she appeared on the "fair" list at the request of a neighbor. Three years later, she was elected to the Grand Council of Ticino, where she sat from 2 May 2007 to 17 May 2015, having been a member of the Political Rights and Legislation Commission there.

In the 2019 federal election, Gysin became the first representative of the Ticino Greens elected to the National Council. In the 2023 federal election, she unsuccessfully ran for the Council of States in October 2023, where she finished in fourth position in the second round; however, she was re-elected to the National Council. She is a member of the Committee on Political Institutions (CIP), which she chairs from the end of 2023, and chairs the delegation for relations with the Italian Parliament since the end of 2021.

== Political positions ==
Gysin favors the environment, gender equality and protection of the labor market.

== Personal life ==
Gysin is single and the mother of three children.
