= 2026 Sark general election =

General election held in Alderney

- 25 November 2026

10 of the 20 seats in the Chief Pleas

A general election is to be held in Sark in 2026. Half of the elected conseillers in the Chief Pleas will be elected, alongside a vacant seat.

== Electoral system ==
The government of Sark was reformed in 2008, replacing the feudal system of government to an elected parliament. The Chief Pleas consists of eighteen members elected by plurality block voting using an island-wide constituency, half of which are up for election every two years, alongside the Seigneur and the Seneschal.

This is the first election in Sark in which proxy voting is available.

== Results ==
An asterisk denotes an incumbent conseiller.

Candidate
Christian Bravery
Carol Cragoe*
Patrick Dewe*
Charlotte Golding
Daniel Golding
John Guille*
Thomas Lalor
Andrew Leaman
Alan McKendry
Nicolas Moloney*
Elliott Osborn
Joseph Perrée*
Helen Plummer*
Karl Rang*
Tomaž Slivnik
Helen Sturman
Total
