= 2026 Tokelauan general election =

- 5 February 2026

All 20 seats in the General Fono
Trio of Ulu-o-Tokelau before election
Kelihiano Kalolo
Esera Fofō Tuisano
Alapati Tavite
Trio of Ulu-o-Tokelau after election
Kelihiano Kalolo
Esera Fofō Tuisano
Alapati Tavite

Tokelau is a dependent territory of New Zealand. Nominally, the Administrator of Tokelau—a New Zealand official—is responsible for the executive government, but a gradual transition of authority has resulted in Tokelau becoming essentially self-governing. Elections are held every three years to elect all the members of the General Fono, the unicameral parliament of Tokelau.

A general election was held on 5 February 2026; it was originally scheduled to take place on 29 January, but had to be postponed after severe weather conditions delayed the ship MV Mataliki delivering the ballot boxes. The government-owned Mataliki is the sole passenger ship serving Tokelau, and there are no airports. Voting took place in Nukunonu, Atafu, and Fakaofo, as well as Apia, Samoa, for the convenience of citizens living there.

Beginning in 2002, the government allocates the number of seats each atoll receives in the Fono by population; in this election, Fakaofo and Atafu each had seven and Nukunonu six. Eligible voters on each atoll elected a Faipule (village head), Pulenuku (mayor), one or more Hui Taupulegas (village elders), one or more Hui Tauleleas (men's representatives) and one or more Hui Fatupaepaes (women's representatives). The office of the Ulu-o-Tokelau, the head of state, is filled by each of the Faipule on a rotating, one-year basis. The Faipule and Pulenuku also constitute the Council for the Ongoing Government of Tokelau, which is chaired by the Ulu. Finally, the Chairman of the Fono is elected by the body's members.

== Results ==
Position	Atafu members	Fakaofo members	Nukunonu members
Faipule	Kelihiano Kalolo	Esera Fofō Tuisano	Alapati Pita Tavite
Pulenuku	Malala Lafaialii	Feleti Tulafono	Petelo Patelesio
Hui Taupulega	Tile Elia	Kaio Isaako	Aleki Sakalia
Hui Taupulega	Stanley Lopa	Kaio Isaako	Viliamu Iosefo
Hui Taupulega	Heluka Sirila	Kaio Isaako	
Hui Taulelea	Tepapa Tom Ioane	Palelei Sili	Tufala Tavite
Hui Taulelea	Tepapa Tom Ioane	Tulafono Tulafono	Tufala Tavite
Hui Fatupaepae	Latu Lopa	Malia Pue	Suliana Pahina
Hui Fatupaepae	Latu Lopa	Elisapeta Helepa Vavega	Suliana Pahina
