= 2026 Alderney general election =

General election held in Alderney

- 21 November 2026; 12 December 2026

5 of the 10 seats in the States of Alderney 2 representatives in the States of Guernsey

Elections were held in Alderney in 2026. Half of the seats in the States of Alderney were elected. In addition, a plebiscite was held for Alderney's two representatives in the States of Guernsey.

== Electoral system ==
The present system of election in Alderney was promulgated in the Government of Alderney Law 2004. Half of the members of the States of Alderney are elected every two years using a system of plurality block voting for a four-year term, using an island-wide constituency.

Two seats of the States of Guernsey are reserved for members of the States of Alderney. These are formally selected by the States of Alderney, however since 2006 a plebiscite has been held to elect these members. The top two candidates will serve as members of both bodies, and the third- and fourth-place candidates will serve as alternate members.

== Timetable ==
Key dates
Date	Event
22 July	The States unanimously approve the dates of the elections.
28 October	Deadline to register to vote.
29 October	Nominations to stand as a States Member opens.
6 November	Nominations to stand as States Member close.
20 November	Nominations to stand in the plebiscite open.
21 November	Election for 5 of the 10 members of the States who will serve until 2030.
27 November	Nominations to stand in the plebiscite close.
12 December	Plebiscite election to decide the two representatives of Alderney in the Guernsey States.

== States election ==
An asterisk denotes an incumbent deputy.

2026 Alderney states election
- 21 November 2026

5 of the 10 seats in the States of Alderney

Candidate	Votes	%
Heather Syer	550	66.19
Jeannie Cameron*	476	57.28
Sarah Woodnutt	473	56.92
Steve Roberts*	423	50.90
Ian Taylor	369	44.40
Haydn Bateman	339	40.79
William Walden	303	36.46
Derwent Smithurst*	254	30.57
Lin Maurice	162	19.49
Total	3,349	100.00
Valid votes	831	99.28
Invalid/blank votes	6	0.72
Total votes	837	100.00
Registered voters/turnout		58

== Representatives of Alderney in the States of Guernsey ==
2026 Alderney representatives in the States of Guernsey plebiscite
- 12 December 2026

2 representatives of Alderney in the States of Guernsey
