= 2026 Fijian constitutional referendum =

A constitutional referendum has been provisionally scheduled to be held in Fiji on 9 December 2026 to determine whether to approve the draft of a new Constitution. While Prime Minister Sitiveni Rabuka has announced the referendum date, it cannot take place unless parliament approves the third reading of the constitutional amendment bill.

== Background ==
After the 2006 Fijian coup d'état, in July 2009, following the suspension of the Constitution in April, interim Prime Minister Frank Bainimarama announced that Fiji would have a new Constitution—its fourth—by 2013. It would remove the ethnic-based provisions of the electoral system. The voting age would be lowered to 18, and the number of seats in Parliament, as well as the "need for a Senate", would be reviewed during the preparatory phase. The new Constitution would derive from the People's Charter for Change, Peace and Progress, and from "extensive" consultations with political parties, non-governmental organisations and ordinary citizens.

In 2012 the military regime appointed a constitutional commission to draft a new constitution as part of a return to democracy. In December 2012, Mosese Tikoitoga ordered all copies of the draft seized and demanded the prosecution of commission chair Yash Ghai. The draft was subsequently discarded and a new, military-drafted constitution imposed. Original draft author Yash Ghai has publicly disagreed with changes in the final document, including the removal of regional representation, maintaining that it favors larger political parties.

The 2013 Constitution of Fiji became the fourth constitution of Fiji, signed into law by President Ratu Epeli Nailatikau on 6 September 2013, coming into effect immediately. It is the first to eliminate race-based electoral rolls, race-based seat quotas, district-based representation, the unelected upper chamber, and the role of the hereditary Council of Chiefs. It vests sole legislative authority in a single-chamber, 50-seat, at-large Parliament, to be first convened following general elections in 2014. It is also the first ever to grant the right to multiple citizenship (in effect since 2009 by decree,on abrogation of the 1997 constitution), and lowers the voting age to 18. However international rights groups organizations such as Amnesty International criticized Fiji’s proposed new constitution, saying it falls far short of international standards of human rights law and is another step backwards in guaranteeing human rights protection for all, pointing at its large immunity provisions for former coup leaders and other military officers.

=== Rabuka ascent to premiership ===
In the 2022 Fijian general elections, Sitiveni Rabuka, a former coup leader, was elected and confirmed as prime minister by parliament on the same day garnering 28 votes of the 55 cast, officially ending Frank Bainimarama's 16-year tenure as prime minister and cementing the PA-NFP-SODELPA government. Bainimarama then conceded defeat peacefully saying "I want to thank the supporters of FijiFirst. We still are the biggest political party in there, so I want to thank them for that. This is democracy, and this is my legacy, the 2013 Constitution." Local elections scheduled to be held in 2026 were postponed by Rabuka until after the next general election, saying rising global economic pressures and fiscal constraints have forced the delay.

== Constitutional change attempts ==
In August 2024 the government of Sitiveni Rabuka announced it would begin a process to amend the constitution, citing the point of legitimacy. Rabuka mentioned that the promulgation process adopted for the 2013 Constitution was not in accordance with what had been decreed as the proper process. The 2013 Fiji Constitution allows for amendments to be made to the Constitution. According to this process, Parliament must pass a Bill in order to amend the Constitution. The Bill must be supported by the votes of at least three-quarters of the Members of Parliament meaning 41 members.

=== 2025 failure to amend the constitution and Supreme Court judgement ===
In March 2025 an attempt was made by Rabuka to change the constitution. However his government failed to secure 75 percent support during the second reading of the Constitution Amendment Bill 2025 in parliament. Despite initial backing from opposition MPs, the final vote saw 40 members voting in favour, 14 against, and one abstention, falling short by one vote. The Bill's failure was seen as a major setback for Rabuka's coalition, which presented the review of the 2013 Constitution as a key promise during its 2022 campaign. Rabuka admitted that the government miscalculated its support for the Bill.

Following the failure to amend the constitution Rabuka's government thereafter opted to ask the Fijian supreme court whetever the 2013 Constitution should be recognised as the legally effective Constitution of Fiji or whether the 1997 Constitution was still applicable and the interpretation and application of the amendment provisions of the 2013 Constitution. The Court held that the 2013 Constitution was legally effective and so the Court did have jurisdiction. The Court held that the prohibition on making any changes to the amendment provision and the three-quarter majorities required in parliament and at referendum meant that there was no “workable” pathway to change the 2013 Constitution. It noted that these majorities were “unusually high” in comparison to past practice in Fiji and the constitutions of other democratic countries. The Court decided to do a “remedial” interpretation of sections 159 and 160 of the 2013 Constitution. The requirement that three-quarters of all the members of Parliament vote in favour of a Bill to change the Constitution was reduced to two-thirds of all members of Parliament and the requirement that “three-quarters of the total number of registered voters” support the change at a referendum was reduced to “a majority of those registered voters who vote in the referendum” effectively being a simple majority needed.

=== 2026 attempt to change the constitution and announced referendum on 9 December ===
In March 2026 Justice Minister Siromi Turaga announced the Constitution would be changed before the Next Fijian general election. Turaga said the review of the Constitution was a key reason the Government came into power. The Commission was established in March and carried out consultations across Fiji before submitting its report and a draft Constitution Bill to President Ratu Naiqama Lalabalavu on 31 August. The constitution review was made public in September 2026 and tabled before parliament. Rabuka announced that tabling the report does not mean it has accepted all of the Commission’s recommendations. The report included proposals for a 41-seat House of Representatives, 26 constituencies and a 19-seat Senate, along with changes to the electoral system with a new Constitution potentially coming into force by 24 December 2026 if the required parliamentary processes are completed and voters approve it. It also recommended sweeping changes to the scrapping immunity that shields those involved in military coups from prosecution, however Rabuka decided to keep some immunity provisions due to him being a coup leader in 1987. Jagath Karunaratne, a Fiji legal expert, said the timetable for replacing the Constitution was extremely compressed, with only six days between the Commission's report being tabled and parliamentary debate beginning on 28 September.

Rabuka announced on 5 October that Fiji will hold its national referendum on 9 December, after President Naiqama Lalabalavu assented to the National Referendum Act 2026. The Bill had passed its second reading with 38 votes in favour, five against and nine abstentions, leading to 30 days of public consultation before the Joint Parliamentary Select Committee reports back on 2 November. It must then win at least 66 per cent support at its third reading before Fijians can vote on it in a referendum. Rabuka had also written to the Electoral Commission seeking the suspension of all general election campaigning until after the referendum writ is returned, saying the referendum needs the necessary “focus and clarity”. The Electoral Commission said it will decide whether general election campaigning should be suspended for all or part of the referendum campaign period, with Electoral Commission chairperson Justice Usaia Ratuvili explaining "the Electoral Commission understands that announcements from the Government will naturally lead to questions from voters, particularly about what happens next."

=== Criticism against fast-track of the new constitution and attempt to suspend election campaigning ===
Jagath Karunaratne warned “A constitution is not ordinary legislation,” and that Parliament should allow enough time for meaningful scrutiny, public education and consultation, particularly with minority communities. Six civil society groups including the Centre for Democracy and Dialogue, Fiji Women’s Rights Movement, Fiji Council of Social Services, Pacific Centre for Peacebuilding, Social Empowerment and Education Programme and femLINK Pacific warned the timetable needs much closer scrutiny because of its proximity to Fiji’s next general election, saying in a joint statement "We view this timeline as dangerous, unnecessary and constitutionally reckless”.

Nilesh Lal, chief executive of the Centre for Democracy and Dialogue, urged the Electoral Commission to assess whether the timetable was workable before a referendum date was fixed saying the tight timetable has raised questions about whether voters will have enough time to understand and debate the proposed constitutional changes. The organization warned that suspending general election campaigning would be "illegal".

==== Government parties ====
The National Federation Party (NFP) and the Social Democratic Liberal Party (SODELPA), both junior parties in Rabuka's government publicly called out the prime minister for fast-tracking a constitutional reform process. NFP leader Biman Prasad who earlier said that his party fully supported the joint parliamentary process to review Fiji's proposed Constitution (Amendment) Bill to change the 2013 Constitution, shifted his stance after Rabuka pre-emptively announced a referendum date saying he "outrightly rejects" Rabuka's attempt to fast-track the process, comparing the approach to the previous Bainimarama administration's unilateral implementation of the 2013 Constitution. Prasad said the PM’s announcement of the referendum date was inconsistent with Section 160(3) of the 2013 Constitution, which sets out the referendum process.

Meanwhile Acting Attorney-General Siromi Turaga denied the process was not rushed and defended the Government’s position as the elected representatives of the people. Deputy Prime Minister Manoa Kamikamica also rejected the suggestion that the process had been too short. He said six months was adequate when considered alongside Fiji’s constitutional history.

==== Opposition ====
Fiji's opposition accused Rabuka of political "strangulation" ahead of an upcoming election when he announced the referendum date. Parliamentary opposition leader Inia Seruiratu said that, by announcing a date for the referendum, Rabuka was "putting the cart before the horse". Seruiratu described the move as "premature", as the Fijian parliament had not completed debating the Constitution (Amendment) Bill. Opposition MP Premila Kumar warned that the proposed constitution could weaken the people’s voice by removing their direct role in future constitutional change. She questioned whether the proposed changes would strengthen democracy or shift constitutional power away from the people and towards Parliament.

Fiji Labour Party leader Mahendra Chaudhry accused Rabuka of acting unlawfully by setting the referendum date and seeking to suspend election campaigning before Parliament completes the required process.

== Draft ==
Proposed changes include establishing a Senate, removing immunity provisions for those involved in the 2006 coup, and re-introducing references to God and Christianity in the preamble. Rabuka also confirmed that the question put to the people has not yet been decided, but said it would only require a 'yes' or 'no' vote.
