= Battles in the Liakhvi Gorge =

- Part of Russo-Georgian War
- A map of the russian offensive in the Liakhvi Gorge.
Date	7–9 August 2008 (2 days)
Location	Liakhvi Gorge, near the Liakhvi Strict Nature Reserve, Georgia
Result	Russian-Ossetian victory: Georgian failure on blocking the Roki Tunnel and the village of Gufta; Successful Georgian evacuation of soldiers and civilians; Start of the Battle of Tskhinvali

Belligerents
(Georgia (country)) Georgia	Russia; South Ossetia

Commanders and leaders
(Georgia (country)) Mamuka Kurashvili (Georgia (country)) David Nairashvili	(South Ossetia) Vasily Lunev (Russia) Anatoly Khrulyov (Russia) Alexander Zhuravlyov (Russia) Sulim Yamadayev

Units involved
Defence Forces of Georgia: Georgian Ground Forces; Georgian Air Force	Russian Armed Forces: 58th Army; Vostok battalion; 19th Motor Rifle Division; 76th Airbone Division; 98th Airbone Division; 31st Separate Airborne Brigade

Strength
(Georgia (country)) 11,700 military personnel, 891 armored vehicles and 138 artillery pieces (Note: The number of men that served in the battle is much smaller.)	(Russia) 700–1,500 men Around 150 tanks and armoured carriers

The Battles in the Liakhvi Gorge were fought between Russian and Georgian forces during the Russo-Georgian War. The battle began with the entry of Russian troops into the territory of South Ossetia through the Roki Tunnel after 2008 Caucasus exercises. After the end of the battle, units of the Ossetian militia army burned several villages located in the Georgian enclave north of Tskhinvali.

== Course of the clashes ==
=== Entrance from the Roki Tunnel ===
According to Russia, the entry of Russian troops began at 14:30 on August 8; According to the Russian Ministry of Defense, the first unit of the 19th Motor Rifle Division passed through the Roki Tunnel at 14:30. According to an interview with Anatoly Khrulyov, the 58th Army began moving out at 1:40 on August 8.

A number of researchers and Georgian officials stated that a Russian tank column began advancing through the Roki Tunnel on August 7. The Russian side argued that the movement of troops through the Roki Tunnel was carried out as part of the normal rotation of Russian peacekeeping forces, but did not provide the required notification of their actions in the event of a rotation. The so-called conversations intercepted by Georgia South Ossetian “border guards” stationed at the Roki Tunnel revealed the time of advance of the first column; in the first conversation, dated 03:41 of August 7, a man who identified himself as Gassiev informed his superior about Russian military vehicles, including armored ones, “overflowing” the tunnel. In the second conversation, at 03:52, he reports to management that the column has already crossed the tunnel. The column was headed by Colonel Kazachenko, under his command at that time was the 693rd mechanized regiment of the 19th Division.

According to journalist Yulia Latynina, on August 7 at 23:30 the second column of tanks began to pass and while the first column was already at their base in Java.

=== March of the Russian army ===
Due to the narrowness of the Roki Tunnel, monstrous traffic jams arose on the road to Java and Tskhinvali, and troops had to be thrown into battle in relatively small detachments. Outdated, dilapidated Russian equipment was constantly breaking down. Navigation and communications practically did not work. Some of the equipment stopped at Java due to lack of fuel. The removal of the wounded and civilians, the approach of volunteers who were completely unnecessary at that time - all led to a devastating supply crisis, and the advanced, relatively small forces had to be thrown into battle disorganized.

During this entrance, at least one plane, a Su-25BM piloted by Vladimir Edamenko, was shot down near the village of Itrapis, either by Georgian or Russian air defense.

During the passage of the village of Java, the Russian column was subjected to attacks by Georgian aircraft and, as a result of the shelling, several people were killed and the bridge located near Java was partially destroyed. It was reported that the first convoy, that included the Ossetian leader Taymuraz Mamsurov and about a thousand volunteers, with its base in Java, advanced to Tskhinvali at 3 AM under the guise of a “humanitarian convoy”, but was bombed at around 5 AM. Also, according to General Anatoly Khrulyov, the village of Java and its surroundings were subject to airstrikes on August 8 at 11:40.

=== Battles for the Guftinsky Bridge ===
According to an interview with Anatoly Khrulyov, the Battle for the Guftinsky Bridge began at 4:40. According to him, an unspecified number of Georgians were already on the bridge and began to block it until a tank platoon under command of Khrulyov captured the bridge on the move, shot down the Georgians and forced them to begin retreating from the bridge. In this battle, Khrulyov, despite being victorious, lost an important infantry fighting vehicle.

According to his statements, after capturing the bridge, the plan was to push the Georgians away from it as far as possible, after which one BTG would go towards Tamarasheni, and the second along the Dzara road, straight to Tskhinvali, to the camp of the former JPKF peacekeepers.
