= Battle of Tskhinvali =

2008 battle in the Russo-Georgian War

Coordinates: 42.2331°N 43.9661°E

Battle of Tskhinvali (2008)
- Part of Russo-Georgian War
- Movements of opposing forces around Tskhinvali. Blue arrows show Georgian movements, red show Russian movements
Date	8–11 August 2008 (3 days)
Location	Tskhinvali, South Ossetia
Result	Russian-South Ossetian victory: Georgian forces withdraw fully from the city; Russian forces continue to advance into undisputed Georgia

Belligerents
(Georgia (country)) Georgia	Russia; South Ossetia

Commanders and leaders
(Georgia (country)) Mikheil Saakashvili (Georgia (country)) Davit Kezerashvili (Georgia (country)) Mamuka Kurashvili (WIA) (Georgia (country)) Vano Merabishvili (Georgia (country)) Zaza Gogava	(Russia) Anatoly Khrulyov (WIA) (Russia) Marat Kulakhmetov (Russia) Sulim Yamadayev (Russia) Kazbek Friev (South Ossetia) Anatoly Barankevich (South Ossetia) Vasily Lunev

Strength
(Georgia (country)) 10,000–11,000 servicemen in entire South Ossetia	496 from Russian battalion, 488 from North Ossetia serving as peacekeepers. Up to 10,000 troops arrived from Russia as reinforcements (South Ossetia) Up to 3,500 troops.

Casualties and losses
(Georgia (country)) Georgia; Fewer than total war casualties Georgian Armed Forces: Killed: 169; Wounded: 947; MIA: 1; Ministry of Internal Affairs: Killed: 11; Wounded: 227; MIA: 3	(Russia) Russia; Fewer than total war casualties: Killed: 67; Wounded: 283; MIA: 3; (South Ossetia) South Ossetia; Fewer than total war casualties Ministry of Defence: Killed: 27; Wounded: 69; Ministry of Internal Affairs: Killed: 10; Ossetian reserves: Killed: c.50

The Battle of Tskhinvali (2008) (Georgian: ცხინვალის ბრძოლა; Russian: Бои за Цхинвали) was a fight for the city of Tskhinvali, the capital of the self-proclaimed Republic of South Ossetia. It was the only major battle in the Russo-Georgian War. Georgian ground troops entered the city on early 8 August 2008. After the three-day fierce fighting with South Ossetian militia and Russian troops, Georgian troops finally withdrew from the city on the evening of 10 August. By 11 August, all Georgian troops had left South Ossetia and Russian forces advanced into undisputed Georgia facing no resistance.

== Background ==
=== Deployment and goals ===
Tskhinvali is located about 25 km (16 mi) from Gori.

At 8:00 am on 1 August, an improvised explosive device detonated on the road near Tskhinvali near a Georgian police vehicle, wounding five police officers. In response, Georgian snipers fired on South Ossetian positions, killing four Ossetians and wounding seven. Grenades and mortar fire were exchanged during the night of 1/2 August. The total Ossetian fatalities became six and the total wounded were now fifteen, among them several civilians; the Georgian casualties were six wounded civilians and one wounded policeman. According to the OSCE mission, the incident was the worst outbreak of violence since 2004. On 2–3 and again on 3–4 August, firing recommenced during the night.

It was reported on 5 August 2008 that 300 volunteers from North Ossetia arrived in Tskhinvali to fight against Georgia, while mobilization of up to 2000 “volunteers” and Cossacks began in the North Caucasus. Freelance photographer Said Tsarnayev came to Tskhinvali on 7 August 2008 and intended to take photos of the nature. 48 Russian journalists had already been present for several days at Tsarnayev's hotel as "if they knew that something was going to happen."

By 20:16 Moscow Time on 7 August 2008, state-controlled Rossiya TV aired President of Abkhazia Sergei Bagapsh as saying: "I have spoken to the president of South Ossetia. It has more or less stabilized now. A battalion from the North Caucasus District has entered the area." On 10 August 2008, Moskovskij Komsomolets published a report by journalist who was in Tskhinvali on the night of 7 August. The report states, "There are 1700 peacekeepers here." According to Russian Defence Ministry official, the 1990s ceasefire accord permitted Russia to station 500 peacekeepers in the conflict zone with 300 additional peacekeepers being reserved for the crises.

On 7 August 2008, foreign intelligence data indicating the deployment of the Russian forces near the Roki Tunnel became known to the Georgian government and numerous Georgian sources have stated that President of Georgia Mikheil Saakashvili became aware that more than 100 Russian military transport had already entered the Roki tunnel at about 23:00 on 7 August. Chief of Staff of the Georgian Armed Forces, Zaza Gogava, told the Georgian parliamentary commission in October 2008 that Saakashvili told him on the secure line at 23:35 on 7 August that "developments went beyond all the limits" and issued orders to stop the ongoing invasion by Russian military hardware, to neutralise Ossetian artillery positions and to defend the civilians. Gogava, explaining the rationale for moving into Tskhinvali, said that "initially such a move was not envisaged", and the first reason for taking the city was to secure Georgian outposts under Ossetian artillery attack and the army had "to move fire line forward" inside Tskhinvali; the second motive was that the residents of the villages north to Tskhinvali could not be rescued via the by-pass road.

According to opposition-minded Russian pundits, Georgian president Saakashvili did not intend to initiate hostilities in August 2008. It was Russia that began deployment of the 58th Army in the Dzau District to accumulate weaponry in preparation for the future occupation of Georgia and ordered separatists in Tskhinvali to open fire to divert Georgians' attention, but Georgian president dared to attack the invading Russian troops and take Tskhinvali, thus subverting the Russian Blitzkrieg. Tbilisi was not taken due to the intervention of the international community.

According to Russian analyst Konstantin Makienko, founder of the Centre for Analysis of Strategies and Technologies (CAST), the Georgian objective was "a rapid destruction of the Ossetian armed forces and a lightning capture of the republic's capital city of Tskhinvali — well before the Russian army could have a chance to intervene" and to establish a pro-Georgian regime in Tskhinvali with Dmitry Sanakoyev as its head. In anticipation of a Georgian operation, South Ossetia had deployed the bulk of its force to protect the town of Java in the north, which had left Tskhinvali sparsely defended.

According to the Moscow Defence Brief, an English-language magazine published by the Russian non-governmental organisation the Centre for Analysis of Strategies and Technologies, the Georgian troops included the 2nd, 3rd and 4th Infantry Brigades, the Artillery Brigade, part of the 1st Infantry Brigade and the standalone Gori Tank Battalion. Additionally, special forces and Ministry of Internal Affairs servicemen were deployed. The total number of troops participating in the war was 16,000 according to the magazine. According to the International Institute for Strategic Studies, ten light infantry battalions of the 2nd, 3rd and 4th infantry brigades, special forces and an artillery brigade, totalling approximately 12,000 troops, had been deployed in the war. According to the EU fact-finding mission, 10,000–11,000 Georgian soldiers took part in the war.

According to the materials that were made available to Independent International Fact-Finding Mission by the South Ossetian authorities, South Ossetian light rifle battalions, artillery units and Soviet-era armoured vehicles took part in the conflict. The total strength of separatist military and law enforcement servicemen, including reservists, was less than 3,500.

Former Chief of the General Staff of Russia Yuri Baluyevsky admitted in 2012 that the plan for the war with Georgia had been created in advance before August 2008 with the blessing of Vladimir Putin. In addition to the building of Russian military bases in South Ossetia, South Ossetian separatists were provided with weaponry and instructors. According to Baluyevsky, the Russian military had chosen South Ossetia as the site for the armed conflict by the summer 2008 and the date of hostilities "was defined from July to September" mostly to coincide with the Beijing Olympic Games. President of Russia Dmitry Medvedev had to authorize the use of force against Georgia as soon as Georgian artillery would attack South Ossetian militants and Russian military then would arrive in Tskhinvali in 6 hours. However, as researcher Andrey Illarionov observed, neither Putin nor Medvedev issued the order in August 2008 to start military operations against Georgia, but it was Major General M. Kulakhmetov, the commander of the Joint Peacekeeping Forces, who did so at about 23:50 on August 7 and the Russian operation began "at least 6 hours before the deaths of the Russian peacekeepers". However, due to the resistance offered by the Georgian military and artillery, the Russian forces did not manage to enter Tskhinvali in 6 hours as planned, which compelled the Russian leadership to alter their plans and finally the Russian military managed with the help of additional reinforcements deployed on 9 August, to enter Tskihnvali "only in early morning of August 10". On 9 August 2008, Putin ordered the Russian forces deployed to Tskhinvali to capture Tbilisi.

== Battle ==
=== Georgian attack ===
==== Artillery preparation ====
Situation in South Ossetia before the war

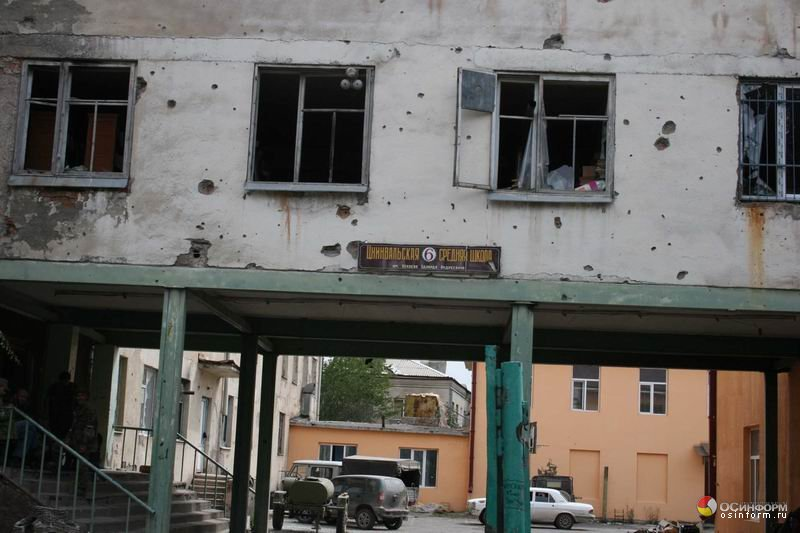
Tskhinvali after the battle. The sign (in Russian) reads "Secondary school #6". August 2008.

Georgian artillery launched smoke bombs into South Ossetia at 23:35 on 7 August. This was followed by a 15-minute intermission, which purportedly enabled the civilians to escape, before the Georgian forces began bombarding hostile positions. Georgian military intentionally targeted South Ossetian military objects, not civilian ones.

Major-general Marat Kulakhmetov, the Commander of Joint Peacekeeping Forces, received in addition to an information on the start of the Georgian military operation in South Ossetia, the request from Mamuka Kurashvili (the commander of the Georgian peacekeepers) not to obstruct the operation. Although Georgian military had pledged safety to the Russian peacekeepers for their neutrality, the Russian peacekeepers had to follow the Russian command to attack the Georgian troops.

==== Georgian advance ====
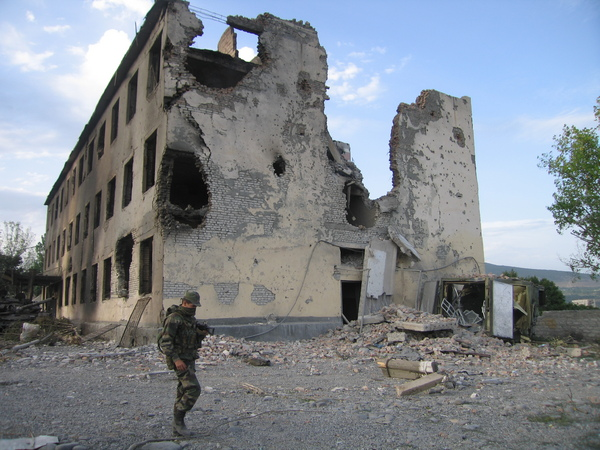
Russian soldiers base in Tskhinvali

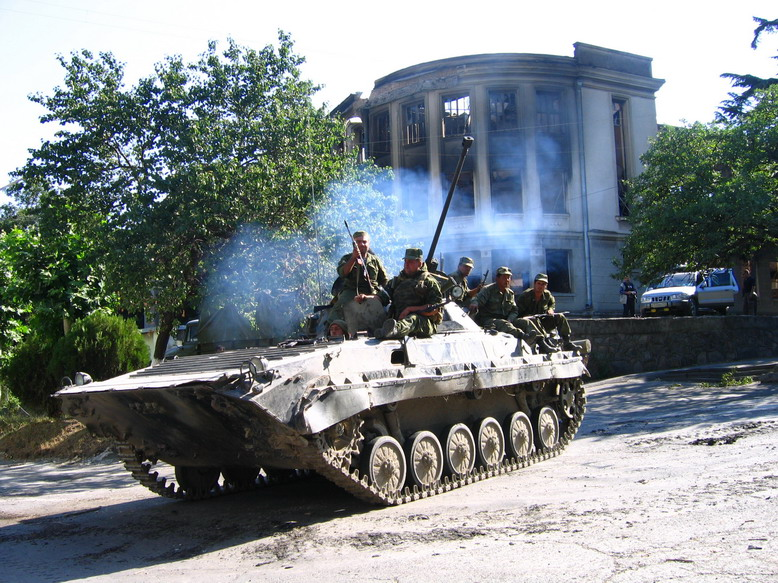
A BMP-2 of the Russian 58th Army in South Ossetia.

Artillery fire against aims in Khetagurovo was opened by the 4th Brigade at 00:40 and soon afterwards the village of Muguti was captured by the two Georgian light infantry battalions. The village of Khetagurovo was then captured by the two battalions after a battle with an inferior South Ossetian troops and several Ossetian-controlled villages of Znaur District to the west of Tskhinvali were taken by another battalion without meeting opposition, while the several villages of Akhalgori District were promptly taken by Georgian Interior Ministry special commandos. The purpose of the Georgian army was to advance to the north after capturing key positions around Tskhinvali. The Georgian troops would secure the Gupta bridge and the road to the Roki Tunnel, barring the Russian military from moving southward.

Georgian sources state that the Georgian artillery hit the Russian troops on the road from the Roki Tunnel at 01:00. Separatist administrative buildings in Tskhinvali came under Georgian fire at 2:00 AM. Georgian troops started closing in on Tskhinvali following several hours of bombardment. Ossetian bombardment of the Georgian forces near the village of Zemo Nikozi and Georgian artillery were unsuccessful. Ossetian peacekeeping battalion began to participate in the conflict. Georgian forces engaged South Ossetian fighters near the town at 04:00 on 8 August, with Georgian tanks remotely shelling South Ossetian positions. An attempt to take the village of Kvaisa from the west of South Ossetia by the Georgian special forces was thwarted by a platoon of South Ossetian troops occupying secure positions, wounding several Georgian soldiers. The Georgian 3rd Infantry Brigade entered the Eredvi area on the eastern flank to Tskhinvali at 06:00 and captured strategic positions; however, they were quickly confronted by a company-sized South Ossetian unit positioned at the Prisi Heights. Georgian State Minister for Reintegration Temur Iakobashvili told Agence France-Presse that Georgian government did not wish "to assault Tskhinvali, but to neutralise separatist positions," and that Georgian troops had taken control of eight South Ossetian villages. South Ossetian leader Eduard Kokoity had told Interfax that the Georgian assault of Tskhinvali was a "perfidious and vile" action. By the morning, the South Ossetian authorities had reported that the Georgian shelling had killed at least 15 civilians.

According to Georgia, Ministry of Internal Affairs special troops entered into southern suburbs of Tskhinvali around 06:00 AM. Artillery and tanks aided the Georgian advance. Georgian troops traded fire with Russian peacekeepers near the Southern complex of the Russian peacekeepers at the entrance of the city. The Russians placed three BMP-1 vehicles near the base after coming under fire from the Georgian Otokar Cobra vehicles. The Georgians called in tank support, and three T-72s from the Independent Combined Tank Battalion soon arrived. According to the CAST, the Georgian tanks began firing at 6:30 and a Russian peacekeeper along with a South Ossetian spectator present on the roof were killed. The tanks then fired on the three Russian BMP-1 vehicles stationed in front of the base, killing five of their crew, who were soldiers of the 135th Motorized Infantry Regiment. During the engagement, one of the Georgian tanks, which was damaged by an RPG-7 rocket, became trapped in an irrigation ditch near the complex and was ditched by its crew. The remaining two tanks continued shelling the base from a remote distance and were joined by Georgian artillery and mortars. The centre of the town was reached by 1,500 Georgian infantrymen by 10:00. The Russian air force began raiding targets inside South Ossetia and Georgia proper after 10:00 on 8 August.

According to the Russian authorities, Georgian troops had seized the Southern Base of the Russian peacekeepers by 11:00 AM. According to Russian government, it suffered its first casualties at around 12:00 when two servicemen were killed and five injured following an attempt by the Georgian troops to storm the northern peacekeeping base in Tskhinvali. Georgia has stated that it only targeted Russian peacekeepers in self-defence, after coming under fire from them. In total, 10 Russian peacekeeping force soldiers were killed during the war according to the Russian government.

=== Russian intervention ===
==== Arrival of Russian reinforcements ====
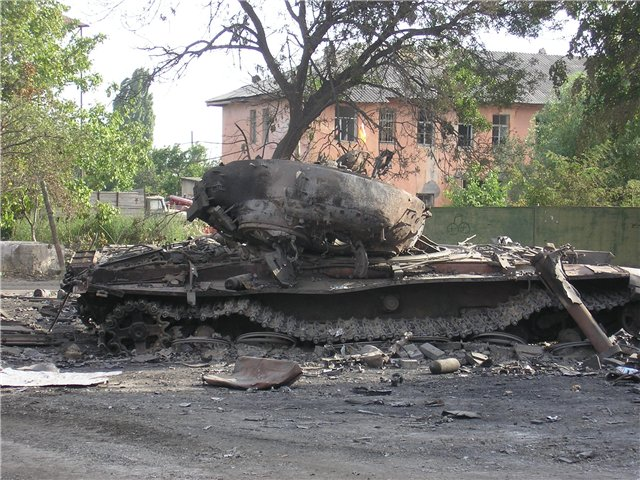
Burned Georgian T-72 tank

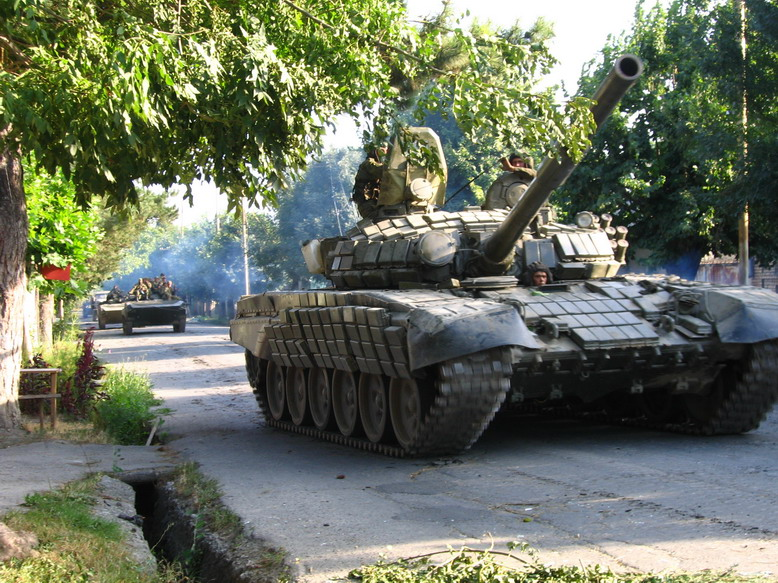
A Russian armoured column in South Ossetia.

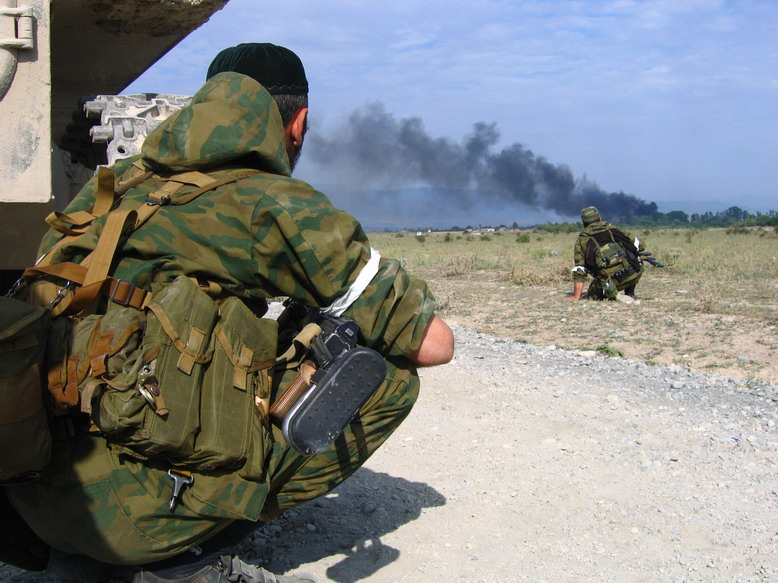
The Russian Army's Vostok Battalion in South Ossetia.

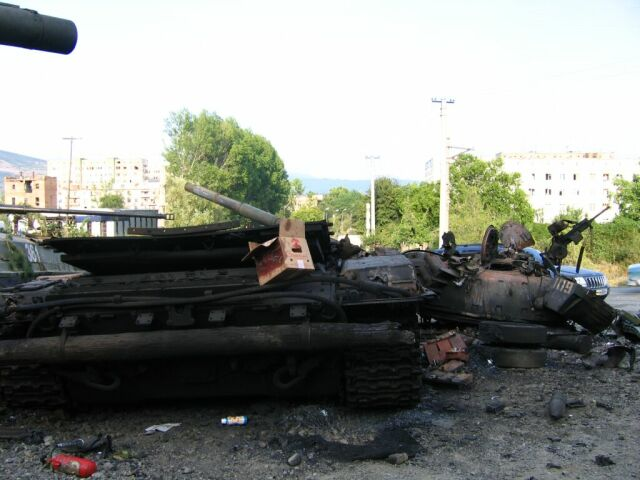
A destroyed Georgian tank in Tskhinvali.

After the war, Denis Sidristy, captain in the 135th Regiment, said in the interview published by Krasnaya Zvezda that his unit was sent to Tskhinvali on 7 August. Sidristy said that he saw the Georgian midnight assault of Tskhinvali. According to a senior Russian official, General Nikolai Uvarov, the first Russian battle unit (135th Motorized Rifle Regiment) was deployed around dawn on 8 August after the Georgian attack and they entered the Roki Tunnel into South Ossetia by 14:30 on August 8; however, due to fierce confrontation from Georgian troops, the Russian battalion managed to arrive in Tskhinvali the following evening. Georgia instead asserted that first Georgian encounter with the Russian troops took place at the tunnel before the dawn of August 8.

According to CAST, Russian president Dmitry Medvedev probably ordered the deployment of the Russian forces to South Ossetia during the phone conversation with defense minister Anatoliy Serdyukov at about 01:00. According to CAST, the Russian Army began to arrive in South Ossetia at 2:00 AM on 8 August, when battalions from the 693rd and 135th Motorized Rifle Regiments began arriving through the Roki Tunnel. Individual groups began securing positions on the road towards Tskhinvali so additional Russian forces would enter the region unimpeded. Russian battalions passed Java by 06:30. By 07:00, the Russian troops were near the Gupta bridge, when they were suddenly attacked by Georgian warplanes. Georgian warplanes were unsuccessful in destroying the bridge, which was necessary for the Russian army deployment to Tskhinvali. According to CAST, Georgian warplanes never flew again during the conflict after this.

South Ossetian and Russian media reports emerged after the war that the Russian forces also shelled Tskhinvali from BM-21 Grads in the morning of 8 August. WikiLeaks later revealed that according to the US Embassy information, "During the night of August 8, four short range ballistic missiles were fired from within Russia toward Tskhinvali." One Russian journalist had witnessed the launch of missiles from the Russian territory on 8 August 2008. Russian researcher Andrey Illarionov stated in August 2009 that the Georgian forces used Grad multiple rocket launchers against the Russian units moving on the Zar, Ger and Transcaucasian roads, while Russia used Grads to shell the residential areas of Tskhinvali.

According to one early Georgian official account published on 9 August 2008, the Russian units first crossed the tunnel at 5:30 on 8 August. They advanced to Tskhinvali through Java. The first column of Russian tanks came close to Tskhinvali at 18:44 and began firing on the Georgian troops in the city and nearby heights, while the second column commenced fire on Georgian troops near the Georgian-controlled Dmenisi (7 kilometers north of Tskhinvali).

According to Russia, the Security Council of South Ossetia appealed to Russia at around 11:00 on 8 August, requesting aid. By 15:00 MSK, an urgent session of Security Council of Russia had been convened by Russian president Dmitry Medvedev and Russia's options regarding the conflict had been discussed. Russia accused Georgia of "aggression" against South Ossetia." Russia has stated it was defending both peacekeepers and South Ossetian civilians who were Russian citizens. While Russia claimed that it had to conduct peacekeeping operations according to the international mandates, in reality such accords had only arranged the ceasefire observer status; according to political scientist Roy Allison, Russia could evacuate its peacekeepers if attacked.

58th Army, the main participant in the conflict, had fought in the Second Chechen War. 76th Guards Air Assault Division and Cossacks also arrived to participate in the fighting.

==== Air operations in South Ossetia ====
Russian aircraft started flying missions in the early hours of 8 August and the Sukhoi Su-24, Sukhoi Su-25, Sukhoi Su-27 and Sukhoi Su-29 aircraft were used in the war. The first Russian air attack was recorded at around 09:30 on 8 August, on the village of Shavshvebi in the Gori District. The first target was Georgian air defence site. Later that day, the source in the Russian Ministry of Defense told the Russian newspaper Kommersant, "the [Russian] planes attacked only military targets: military base in Gori, airfields in Vaziani and Marneuli as the radar station 40 kilometres from Tbilisi". The officer was asked why Russian warplanes invaded Georgian airspace well before Russian government announced the involvement in the conflict. He responded, "According to order from our command." Georgian authorities stated that they began using aviation only after three Russian Su-24 planes had flown into the Georgian airspace at 11:00. According to Kommersant, Georgian official said that by that time Russian peacekeepers had not participated in the conflict. Georgian warplanes and helicopters, which flew a few raids mostly during the morning of 8 August, did not impact the course of the fighting. In December 2008, former Secretary of the South Ossetian Security Council Anatoly Barankevich told Kommersant that Russian aviation bombed Tskhinvali during the battle with the Georgian forces.

According to the Centre for Analysis of Strategies and Technologies (CAST), Russia never gained dominance in air in the South Ossetian theatre, as the Russian Air Force took early losses (three Su-25s) to Georgian anti-aircraft fire, and was forced to stop making sorties for two days. Citing eyewitness reports, CAST writes that "... there were no Russian aircraft over Tskhinvali on August 8 or the following day — that is. during the most critical period of the conflict. In effect, the Russian military command was forced to bring motor-rifle units into battle from the march, without first gaining superiority in numbers and firepower." Russian aviation only recommenced flights on 10 August.

During the early stages of the battle, the loss of two Russian aircraft, a Sukhoi Su-25 and a Tupolev Tu-22M, was admitted by Anatoliy Nogovitsyn of the Russian General Staff on August 9. The fate of their pilots was unknown back then. Reuters reported that one Russian pilot was probably taken prisoner. South Ossetia claimed that two Georgian aircraft were shot down by Ossetian soldiers.

The Russian Air Force conducted around 200 missions during the war; however, the Russian aircraft had to perform missions in the daylight since the aircraft did not possess the technical means to operate during the night unlike the Georgian Air Force. Russian air force could not assist Russian ground forces by destroying the Georgian air defence partly due to lack of training in this role. The Georgian warplanes still posed a threat for the Russians by 11 August due to Russia not achieving air superiority, according to the International Institute for Strategic Studies. Moscow Defense Brief strongly criticised the performance of the Russian Air Force, saying that the Russian ground forces and air force did not coordinate their actions, and that friendly fire was responsible for downing of half of the Russian aircraft lost during the war.

==== Georgian advance is stopped ====
Most of Tskhinvali and several villages had been secured by Georgian troops by the afternoon; but the Georgians had been unable to take the northern and some central parts of the city. The military opposition to Georgian advance was increasing. South Ossetian General Anatoly Barankevich destroyed a Georgian T-72 tank and its crew at around 2:00 PM, and soon two Georgian T-72 tanks were destroyed by the South Ossetian militants. Russian air attack on the Georgian positions in the westernmost part of Tskhinvali killed more than 20 Georgian troops, causing the Georgian battalion to abandon its positions, dead comrades and most weaponry.

At about 15:00, Eduard Kokoity was meeting with the Head of the Republic of North Ossetia–Alania Taymuraz Mamsurov in Java. Mamsurov was followed by about one thousand volunteers, and one of the columns had been bombed by the Georgian aviation on the bridge near Java. Java had been transformed into quite-well equipped fortification in the previous months. One Georgian diplomat told Kommersant on the same day that by taking control of Tskhinvali, Tbilisi wanted to demonstrate that Georgia wouldn't tolerate the killing of Georgian citizens and capturing Java was not their intention.

==== Fighting between Georgian and Russian forces ====
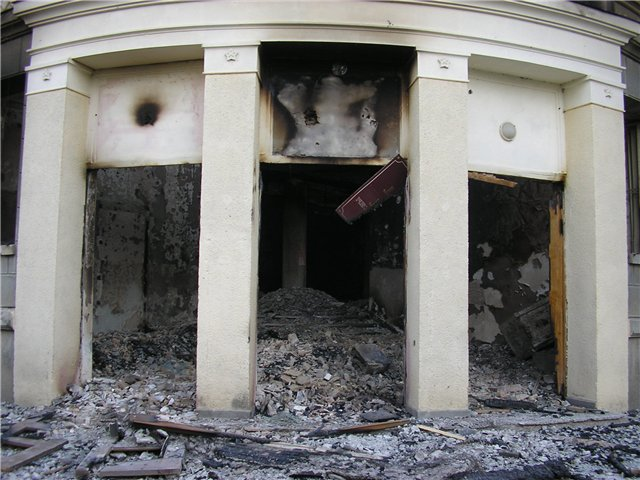
Parliament of South Ossetia, after the fighting

At around 16:00 MSK, it became known that two heavy armoured columns of the 58th Army passed the Roki Tunnel and Java and were on the road to Tskhinvali. According to Kommersant, the column had begun moving towards South Ossetia at the same time as President Medvedev was giving a televised speech. According to the official version, they were "aid for peacekeeping forces, who have suffered serious losses". According to Kommersant, the Russian armored hardware had been stationed near the South Ossetian border in Alagirsky District for the past few weeks. At around 17:00 MSK, Russian tank columns surrounded Tskhinvali and began bombing the Georgian positions.

Georgian troops left the centre of the town in the evening. Georgians regrouped in southern Tskhinvali. The 2nd Infantry Brigade arrived from Senaki and replaced the 4th Brigade on the left side. Georgian troops and civilian population began leaving the Georgian villages in the north by 18:00. Georgian forces abandoned Tskhinvali by 22:00 and Russian troops took Khetagurovo. According to Moscow Defense Brief, battalions from the 135th, 503rd and 693rd Motorized Rifle Regiments belonging the 19th Motorized Rifle Division of the 58th Army from Vladikavkaz had pushed Georgian forces from parts of Tskhinvali and several Ossetian villages by the end of the day.

Official military casualties, as reported on 8 August, were claimed to be 30 Georgians and 21 Russian soldiers killed. One South Ossetian resident had told the Russian newspaper Kommersant that although there were rumours that "almost everyone" was evacuated from South Ossetia to Vladikavkaz, there seemed to be some civilians left in Tskhinvali.

At around 4:00 AM on 9 August, a Russian unit managed to arrive at the southern base of the peacekeepers and started to defend it against Georgians until late afternoon. Several battalions of Russian troops brought into the battle were making slow progress through the narrow Roki Tunnel and along the mountain roads. An intense fighting occurred on 9 August in the area of Tskhinvali. Several counterattacks were initiated by the Georgians.

==== The ambush ====
Around 15:00 on 9 August, a Russian advance convoy, led by the 58th Army commander Lieutenant General Anatoly Khrulyov, moved into Tskhinvali from the Roki Tunnel and got ambushed by Georgian special unit near Tskhinvali. Khrulyov was wounded in the leg. A Russian major named Denis Vetchinov created a defense perimeter. he was hit in the head and died en route to hospital. Vetchinov was awarded the title of Hero of the Russian Federation posthumously.

The remaining Russian units managed to break out of the encirclement carrying out their general and the mortally wounded Vetchinov. During this battle, Georgian forces had decimated the entire convoy, and destroyed 25 out of 30 Russian vehicles. Khrulyov himself said that day that the battalion no longer existed. One Russian analyst later speculated that the general's capture could have been a primary goal of the Georgians and his presence in the convoy had been known in advance due to the work of the Georgian intelligence in Russia.

==== Turning point and Georgian withdrawal ====
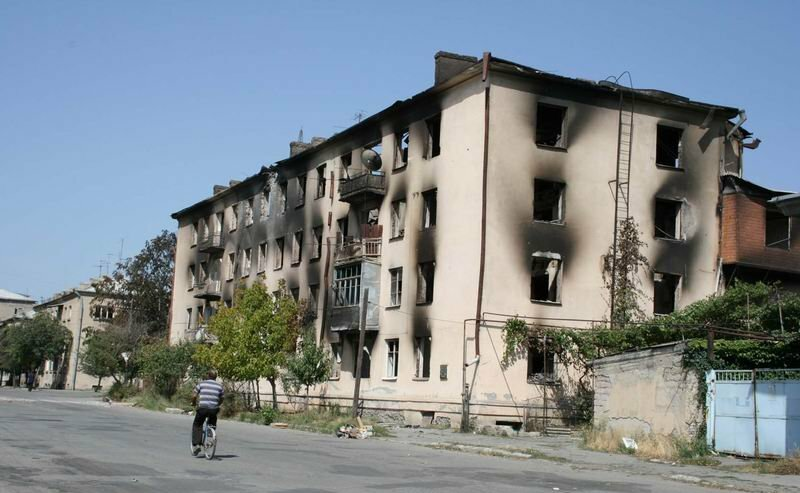
A building in Tskhinvali on 18 August.

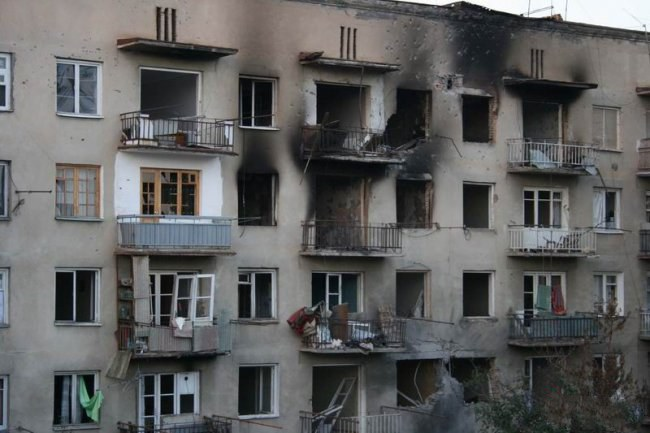
A damaged apartment building in Tskhinvali

In the afternoon of 9 August, a Georgian effort to push deeper into Tskhinvali was repulsed with Georgian losses and they withdrew. According to the Georgian Defence Minister, the Georgian military had tried to push into Tskhinvali three times by 9 August. During the last attempt they were met with a serious counterattack, which Georgian officers described as "something like hell."

By the evening of 9 August, the Georgian interior ministry claimed that Tskhinvali was fully taken by the Georgian troops and that the Georgian troops would march towards Java.

The number of Russian forces deployed in South Ossetia exceeded the number of Georgians by 9–10 August. According to Moscow Defence Brief, Georgian troops had pushed the opposition to the northern part of the town by the morning of 10 August. However, Moscow Defense Brief writes:

... "on this very day the accumulation of Russian forces in the region finally bore fruit, and the fighting in South Ossetia reached a turning point. Toward the evening of August 10, Tskhinvali was completely cleared of Georgian forces, which retreated to the south of the city. Georgian forces were also repelled from the key Prisi heights. The bulk of Georgia’s artillery was defeated. Meanwhile, Ossetian forces, with the support of Russian divisions, took Tamarasheni, Kekhvi, Kurta, and Achabeti on the approach to Tskhinvali from the north. Georgian forces in several of Georgian enclaves were eliminated."

Konstantin Makienko writes:

"The Georgian troops maintained the tactical initiative on the outskirts of Tskhinvali throughout August 9 and even during August 10. What thwarted the Georgian operation in the end was not the Russian Air Force, but the resistance offered by peacekeepers and lightly armed, poorly organized South Ossetian units that stayed behind to defend the capital. [...] Essentially, the Georgian troops failed to take Tskhinvali because they were not prepared psychologically for severe urban fighting."

A ceasefire was unilaterally announced on 10 August by Georgian authorities, who stated an aim to pull Georgian troops out of South Ossetia. However, Russia did not embrace this truce offer. Most Georgian troops had left South Ossetia by the night of 10–11 August. Georgian forces started retreating to Gori. According to Moscow Defence Brief, Georgian forces were finally expelled from South Ossetia by the end of 11 August. The high toll within the Georgian 4th Mechanised Infantry Brigade during the withdrawal was due to Russian air raid. In the region of the village of Zemo-Nikozi, Georgian servicemen initially managed to ward off the Russian advance. However, the Russians then succeeded in defeating the Georgians. An hour-long engagement took place in the village of Shindisi on 11 August between the Georgian convoy of the 2nd Light Infantry Brigade and the Russian forces near the railway station. The Russians had to use tanks and reinforcements against the Georgians. 17 Georgian soldiers were killed during the fight.

South Ossetian government representative claimed on 11 August that Georgian troops opened the irrigation canal to flood basements in Tskhinvali and prevent civilians from seeking shelter.

Russian President Medvedev said on 12 August 2008 that he had authorized a cessation of military action in Georgia because "the aggressor has been punished". Medvedev gave an order to Russian forces to fire on "hotbeds of resistance" and other "aggressive actions". Associated Press reported that a Russian Army Colonel said there were orders not to advance into Georgia and claimed: "We are staying here." After the ceasefire agreement was negotiated by French president Nicolas Sarkozy on 12 August, 15:00 on 12 August was set as a deadline for the cessation of military action; however, Russian forces didn't stop pushing forward.

Map of destruction in the city and suburbs, compiled by a UNOSAT satellite imagery survey; The map shows the territories controlled by Ossetia and Georgia, as well as the posts and the base of the JPKF forces.

== Aftermath and assessments ==
Russian authorities claimed by August 9 that the civilian casualties in Tskhinvali amounted up to 2,000. Russia accused Georgia of committing "genocide". This assertion of genocide was untrue. Although Russia initially used alleged genocide of Ossetians as justification for its military action, later Russian and South Ossetian officials could not validate this assertion and barely mentioned it. In December 2008, the figures were revised down to a total of 162 South Ossetian casualties by the Investigative Committee of the Prosecutor's Office of the Russian Federation.

Russian TV aired infrastructure damage in Tskhinvali. A Guardian reporter wrote on 13 August that rumors of total destruction of Tskhinvali were overstatements and some Tskhinvali areas were undamaged at all. He had witnessed a massive Russian convoy near the town of Java, which was a "testament to the might of the resurgent Russian state," and several rocket launchers, which "were a sign of Moscow's intent to hold Tskhinvali at all costs."

Reporter for REGNUM News Agency reported on 9 August that the Georgian forces, mainly comprised from Mingrelians, were almost completely controlling Tskhinvali on 8 August and had removed South Ossetian flag from the presidential palace.

Several journalists were reported on 11 August 2008 to be among the casualties, including the two, who were embedded with the ambushed Russian armoured column, in which General Khrulyov was wounded. Russian journalist Irina Kuksenkova reported that she witnessed the corpses of the entire company of the Vostok battalion near Tskhinvali.

Tanya Lokshina, deputy head of Moscow Bureau of Human Rights Watch, reported from Java on 12 August 2008 that she witnessed a huge number of Russian military hardware being moved into South Ossetia and deployed to Georgia, adding that her colleague had never witnessed such concentration of military hardware during the Chechen wars. Lokshina said that almost all male population of South Ossetia were members of militia.

According to a doctor at Tskhinvali hospital interviewed by the Human Rights Watch on 12 August 2008, the hospital handled 273 injured (predominantly military) from 6 to 12 August, and received forty-four bodies (the majority of Ossetians killed in Tskhinvali). One doctor told Human Rights Watch that the artillery attack forced the relocation of all the wounded to the basement.

Russian military journalist Arkady Babchenko reported on 13 August 2008 that all armed volunteers were granted passage into South Ossetia without questioning by Russian border guards on 10 August 2008. Babchenko suggested that there were rumors in Tskhinvali that the Russian authorities were lowering the number of the killed Russian peacekeepers and the actual Russian losses could be up to 200 peacekeepers. He witnessed dogs eating the dead Georgian soldiers in Tskhinvali. He stated that the killed civilians definitely did not number in the thousands.

The Government of South Ossetia resumed operation in Tskhinvali on 13 August 2008. Sergei Shoigu, Minister of Emergency Situations of Russia, announced that Radio and TV stations would begin broadcasting in Tskhinvali on 14 August and newspapers would be published.

Ukrainian journalist Ruslan Yarmolyuk working for Inter TV channel described the days spent during the war in Tskhinvali on 14 August 2008. He stated that after Georgian tanks entered Tskhinvali on 8 August, Russian jets began bombing the Georgian positions. Russian journalists reported to have witnessed Eduard Kokoity's return from Java to Tskhinvali on 9 August 2008.

Political commentator of Forum.msk agency stated on 15 August 2008 that 38 dead fighters of the Vostok Battalion were sent to Chechnya on 11 August and 35-40 dead fighters of the Zapad Battalion were buried in Chechnya.

Pro-Russian president of South Ossetia Eduard Kokoity announced that he would appeal to Russia to establish Russian military base in South Ossetia. Nezavisimaya Gazeta reported on 19 August 2008 that two military townlets had already been built near Java and Tskhinvali; however, the military townlet near Tskhinvali had suffered damage during the war as it was one of the main targets of the Georgian artillery and BM-21 Grads. Head of the South Ossetian information committee Irina Gagloeva said that the South Ossetian public opinion was now ready to accept the Russian military bases.

Russian journalist Dmitry Belyakov wrote on 21 August 2008 that some politicians were exaggerating the scale of the damage to Tskhinvali. He wrote that all administrative buildings, the police department, the mayor's office, the parliament were burned down after the battle. He witnessed that the Ossetians were not paying attention to the Georgian corpses rotting in the hot sun.

In late August 2008, Georgian president Mikheil Saakashvili accused the Russian forces of being responsible for 80% of the destruction of Tskhinvali.

Member of the Parliamentary Assembly of the Council of Europe Luc Van den Brande visited South Ossetia on 25 September 2008 and said that there had been no genocide in Tskhinvali.

South Ossetian president Eduard Kokoity said in an interview in December 2008 that as soon as Tskhinvali was attacked on 8 August 2008, he established a contact with the Chief of the General Staff of Russia and Commander of the North Caucasus Military District. He said that the first Russian BMP-1 convoy arrived in Java at 8:00 in the morning of 8 August 2008. Kokoity also сlaimed that the Georgian forces did not manage to remove any Ossetian flag in the city.

Russian journalist Yulia Latynina noted that when the Georgian forces entered Tskhinvali on 8 August 2008, nothing was destroyed in Tskhinvali; Tskhinvali was ruined after the city was taken by the Russian army in 3 days. She asked who bombed Tskhinvali when it was controlled by the Georgians and noted that 2 attempts to repel the Georgians from Tskhinvali by armored attack failed. Latynina also asked what the Russian bomber jet was doing above Tskhinvali that was shot down by the Ossetians. She answered her own question that the Russian bomber was attacking Tskhinvali because the Russian TV had already accused Georgia of destroying Tskhinvali on 7 August 2008.

In January 2009, Human Rights Watch issued the report which stated that Georgian forces used Grad multiple rocket launchers, self-propelled artillery, mortars and howitzers against South Ossetian targets during the initial phase of the conflict. The South Ossetian parliament and several schools and nurseries were used as military posts by South Ossetian troops and volunteer militias and targeted by Georgian artillery fire. Georgia stated that its strikes only intended to "neutralize firing positions from where Georgian positions were being targeted". HRW documented witness accounts of the usage of civilian objects by South Ossetian fighters. Such usage made civilian objects permissible military aims, and HRW concluded that South Ossetian fighters put non-combatant population at risk by setting up military positions near or in civilian structures. Georgia was responsible for the indiscriminate use of force by using inaccurate weapons to target military targets in civilian areas. HRW noted that many civilians had left Tskhinvali before 7 August 2008.

In August 2009, Russian journalist Yuriy Snegirev, traveling from the Roki Tunnel to Tskhinvali, saw the building of the Peacemakers in Tskhinvali, and the gate now bore the emblem of the Federal Security Service and the Border Service.

On 8 August 2009, a monument dedicated to Alexey Ivanov, Russian soldier killed in the battle in August 2008, was inaugurated in Tskhinvali.

President of North Ossetia Taymuraz Mamsurov claimed on 8 August 2008 that the Georgians had bombed a peaceful humanitarian convoy. Reporter for State TV channel Zvezda Algis Mikulskis later reported that he was moving from Tskhinvali to Java during the night of 8 August and he encountered column of Russian armored vehicles near Java at around 3–4 hours in the morning and the column was bombed by Georgian planes. Russian journalist Yulia Latynina suggested that this column had started moving towards Tskhinvali a lot earlier than the official Russian order for attacking Georgia was issued and noted that no photo of the bombed humanitarian convoy existed. Latynina also questioned the Russian claim that the Georgians had indiscriminately shelled Tskhinvali with BM-21 Grad Multiple rocket launchers and noted that reporter of Izvestia Yuri Snegirev was observing the Georgian artillery fire from the roof of the Tskhinvali hotel on the night of 8 August 2008 and then slept in his room, which would have been impossible if the Georgians had indiscriminately attacked the civilian areas in Tskhinvali on 8 August. Latynina also questioned the Russian claim that the Georgians had deliberately attacked the Russian peacekeepers and quoted South Ossetian official Inal Pliev as recalling that Georgian tanks passed by the Russian peacekeeping base where Pliev was hiding.
