= Vasily Lunev =

Russian military officer

- Василий Лунев

Chief of the General Staff of Abkhazia
- In office 2 August 2018 – 4 November 2022
- President: Raul Khajimba
- Preceded by: Anatoly Khrulyov
- Succeeded by: Vladimir Savchenko

Minister of Defense of South Ossetia
- In office March 2008 – March 2009
- President: Eduard Kokoity
- Preceded by: Oleg Ivannikov
- Succeeded by: Yuri Tanayev

Personal details
- Born: Vasily Vasilyevich Lunev; 1956 (age 69–70) Chelyabinsk, Soviet Union
- Education: Moscow Higher Combined Arms Command School; Frunze Military Academy; Military Academy of the General Staff of the Armed Forces of Russia
- Occupation: Military officer

Military service
- Allegiance: Soviet Union; Russia; South Ossetia; Abkhazia
- Branch/service: Soviet Army; Russian Army; South Ossetian Army; Abkhazian Army
- Rank: Major general
- Commands: 58th Army
- Battles/wars: Russo-Georgian War; Battle in the Liakhvi Gorge; Battle of Tskhinvali

Vasily Vasilyevich Lunev (Russian: Василий Васильевич Лунев; born 1956) is a Russian military officer. He has served as the Minister of Defense of South Ossetia from 2008 to 2009 and as the Chief of the General Staff of Abkhazia from 2018 to 2022.

== Biography ==
Vasily Lunev was born in 1956 in Chelyabinsk, Soviet Union. Lunev attended and graduated from the Moscow Higher Combined Arms Command School, the Frunze Military Academy, and the Military Academy of the General Staff of the Armed Forces of Russia.

Lunev was the military commissioner of Perm Krai from December 2007 to March 2008. From March 2008 to March 2009, Lunev served the Minister of Defense of South Ossetia. According to Russian media, Lunev commanded the 58th Army from 9 to 18 August 2008 during the Russo-Georgian War after Colonel General Anatoly Khrulyov was wounded in action. According to Anatoly Barankevich, the head of the South Ossetian Security Council, Lunev commanded the Special Battalions Vostok and Zapad during the Battle of Tskhinvali. Lunev resigned as minister after being unable to obtain a new position in Eduard Kokoity's cabinet and resumed his service as the military commissioner of Perm Krai. From March 2013 to March 2017, Lunev was a part of a groups military specialists in Algeria.

On 2 August 2018, Abkhaz president Raul Khajimba announced Lunev's appointment as the Chief of the General Staff, succeeding Khrulyov who had served since 2015. He also served as the First Deputy Minister of Defense. On 4 November 2022, Lunev was succeeded by Colonel General Vladimir Savchenko.

== Awards and decorations ==
Lunev has received the following awards and decorations.

Russia / Soviet Union

- Medal for Military Valor, 1st class
- Medal for Military Valor, 2nd class
- Medal for Impeccable Service, 1st class
- Medal for Impeccable Service, 2nd class
- Medal for Impeccable Service, 3rd class
- 60 Years of the Armed Forces of the USSR Jubilee Medal (1978)
- 70 Years of the Armed Forces of the USSR Jubilee Medal (1988)
- 200 Years of the Ministry of Defense Medal (2002)
- Medal for Strengthening Military Cooperation

South Ossetia

- Order of Friendship (22 February 2013)

Political offices
Preceded by Oleg Ivannikov	Minister of Defense of South Ossetia; 2008–2009	Succeeded by Yuri Tanayev
Military offices
Preceded by Anatoly Khrulyov	Chief of the General Staff of Abkhazia; 2018–2022	Succeeded by Vladimir Savchenko
