= Ibrahim Gazseev =

South Ossetian military leader and government official

Lieutenant General Ibrahim Gazseev
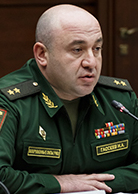
- Lieutenant General Ibrahim Gazseev during a visit to Moscow.
- Born: 30 August 1978 (age 48); South Ossetian Autonomous Oblast, Soviet Union
- Military career
- Allegiance: South Ossetia
- Branch: South Ossetia Army
- Service years: 1996–present
- Rank: Lieutenant General
- Commands: Ministry of Defence (South Ossetia)

Lieutenant General Ibrahim Alimbegovich Gazseev (Russian: Ибрагим Алимбегович Гассеев) is a South Ossetian military leader and government official. He served as the Minister of Defence of South Ossetia from 2016 to 2022.

== Military career ==
He was born on 30 August 1978. He graduated from South Ossetian State University majoring in Physical Education in 2000 and again in 2013. Gazseyev was drafted into the Armed Forces of South Ossetia in 1996. At the same time he was sworn in, he was sent for further military service in the special forces company of the Ministry of Emergency Situations and Defense. In 2012, he graduated from the Military Academy of the General Staff of the Armed Forces of the Russian Federation under the program of professional training for foreign specialists. In 2015, he got his master's degree from the Russian Presidential Academy of National Economy and Public Administration. After holding senior-level posts in the ministry, he was finally appointed as minister in September 2016. He was also a deputy of the Parliament of South Ossetia in its 6th convocation.

On 25 February 2022, he was dismissed from the post of Minister of Defense. Later, he attempted to participate in the 2022 South Ossetian presidential election against his former boss, saying that "as long as he remains a presidential candidate, he will simply not let us hold fair elections.”

== Awards ==
He is a recipient of the following awards:

- Medal "10 years of the Armed Forces of South Ossetia" (2003)
- Medal "Defender of the Fatherland" (2005)
- Uatsamonga Order (2008)
- Medal "For Military Merit" (Transnistria, 2006)
- Medal "For Military Valor" (Abkhazia, 2012)
- Medal "In commemoration of the 25th anniversary of the Republic of South Ossetia" (2015)
- Medal "For Military Merit" (2015)
