= 3rd Infantry Brigade (Georgia) =

- 3-ლი ქვეითი ბრიგადა
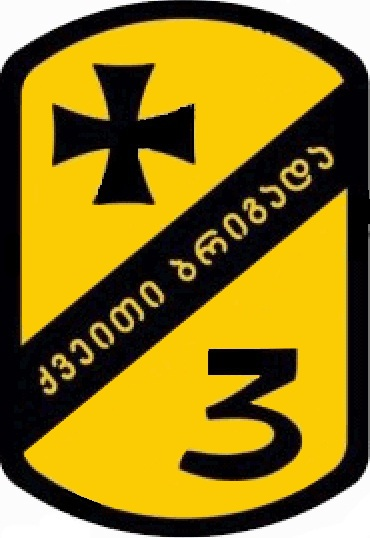
- Active: December 2004 – Present
- Country: Georgia
- Branch: Georgian Land Forces
- Type: Infantry
- Part of: Operational Command West
- Garrison/HQ: Kutaisi, Georgia
- Engagements: Iraq War; Russo-Georgian War: Battle of Tskhinvali; War in Afghanistan

The 3rd Infantry Brigade (Georgian: მე-3 ქვეითი ბრიგადა, romanized: me-3 kveiti brigada) is an infantry brigade of the Georgian Land Forces. It is attached to the Georgian Operational Command West.

== History ==
The brigade was formed in December 2004. 2,000 members of the brigade participated in the Iraq War until 2007. Prior to the Russo-Georgian War, the 3rd Infantry Brigade, alongside the 2nd Infantry Brigade and 4th Infantry Brigade had been deployed to the vicinity of the Georgia–South Ossetia border. During the Battle of Tskhinvali, the 3rd Brigade had entered the Eredvi area on the eastern flank of the city of Tskhinvali at 06:00 and had taken some positions in the area. However, the brigade was attacked by a smaller force of South Ossetian militia and pushed back. After the war with Russia, the brigade was deployed to Afghanistan in 2010.
