= Denis Vetchinov =

Hero of the Russian Federation (1976–2008)

Denis Vasiliyevich Vetchinov (Russian: Денис Васильевич Ветчинов; 28 June 1976 – 9 August 2008) was a Russian Ground Forces major killed in action during the 2008 South Ossetia war and posthumously awarded Russia's highest military award, Hero of the Russian Federation, for his role in the conflict. In film August Eighth Vetchinov became a prototype of captain Ilya played by Khasan Baroyev.

== Biography ==
Born 23 June 1976 in Stepnogorsk (now Kazakhstan), he graduated from the Omsk Officers' Academy in 1999. He participated in the Second Chechen War.

== Death ==
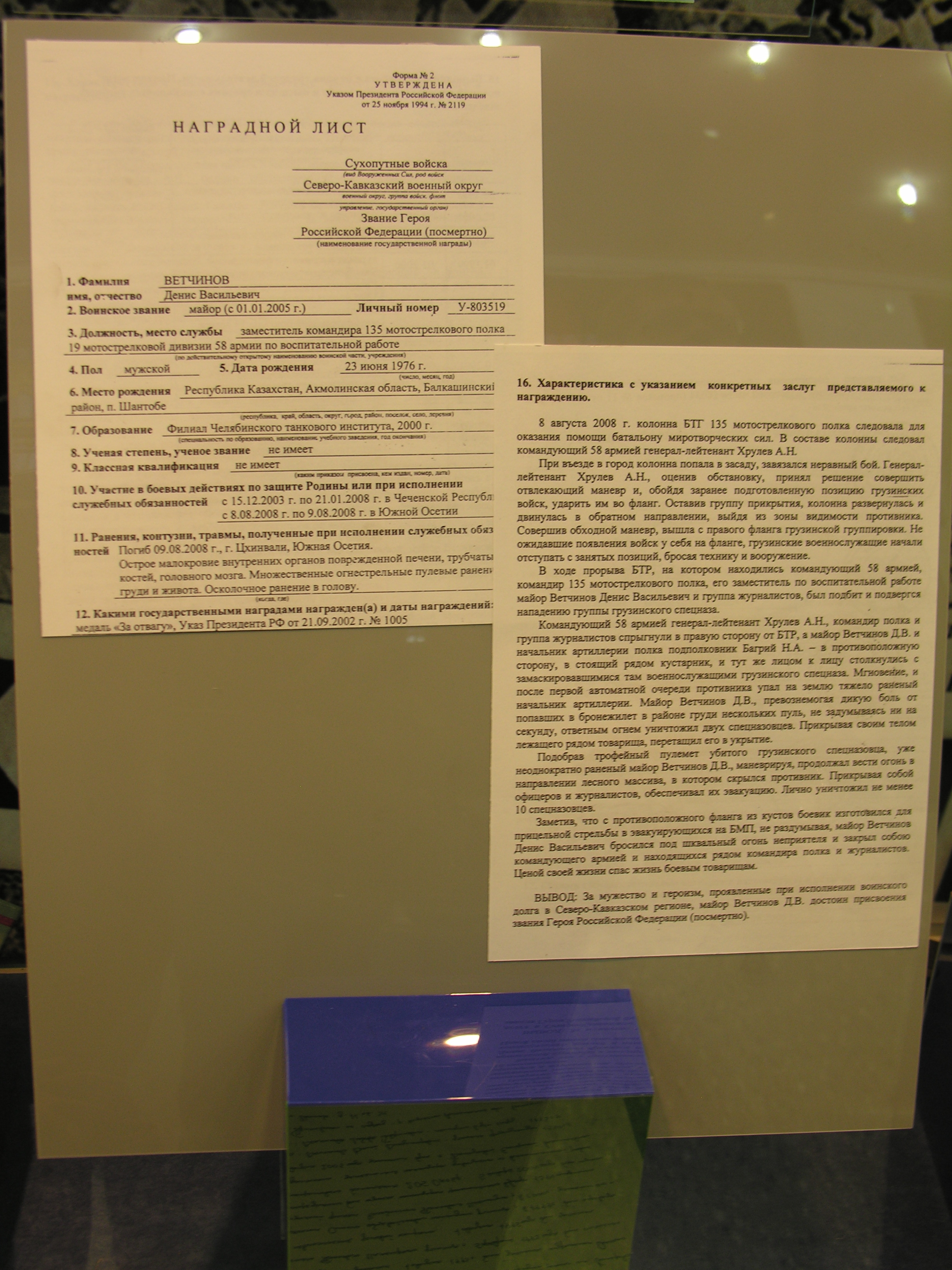
Award application of Denis Vetchinov, Central Armed Forces Museum, August 15, 2008

On 9 August 2008, the second day of Russian involvement in the Battle of Tskhinvali, a column of Russian vehicles with a few journalists and 58th Army commander Anatoly Khrulyov onboard was ambushed by Georgian special forces in the outskirts of Tskhinvali. Khrulyov was wounded in the ensuing firefight. Allegedly Vetchinov, armed with a trophy Georgian machine gun, organised defence but was wounded in both legs. He continued firing at the enemy and killed a Georgian soldier. Vetchinov kept covering fire until he was hit in the head by Georgian fire. He died on the way to hospital. On 15 August Denis Vetchinov was posthumously awarded the Hero of the Russian Federation golden star "for courage and heroism while fulfilling his duty in the North Caucasus region". He is survived by his wife and little daughter.

== See also ==
- List of Heroes of the Russian Federation
