= 4th Guards Military Base =

Russian military unit in South Ossetia

Coordinates: 42.189°N 43.939°E

- 4-я гвардейская военная база
- The Great emblem of 4th Guards Military Base
- Active: 2009–Present (unofficially 2006–Present)
- Country: Russia
- Allegiance: Russia; South Ossetia
- Branch: Russian Armed Forces
- Type: Task force/Military base
- Size: 4,500 soldiers
- Part of: 58th Army of the Southern Military District
- Headquarters: Tskhinvali
- Nickname: Vapniarka-Berlin

Commanders
- Current commander: Guards Colonel Alexander Kravtsov

The 4th Guards Military Base (Russian: 4-я гвардейская военная база) is a sizable overseas military base of the Russian Armed Forces stationed in the disputed territory of South Ossetia. Russia considers South Ossetia to be an independent state and justifies its military deployment in the area by an intergovernmental agreement, while Georgia considers the entity as its territory occupied by Russia.

The military base is subordinate to the 58th Army within the Southern Military District of the Russian Armed Forces. It was the first military of strategic importance in the Caucasus. The base is located in the city of Tskhinvali and the town of Java. It has the Military Unit Number (в/ч) is 66431.

== History ==
After the 1991–1992 South Ossetia War, a Joint Control Commission was created on the basis of the Dagomys agreement from representatives of four parties: Georgia, South Ossetia, Russia and North Ossetia. From 1993 to 2008, the mixed Joint peacekeeping force (consisting of three battalions - Russian, Georgian and Ossetian) were deployed in South Ossetia. Before the war of 2008, Georgian peacekeepers who were part of the Joint Staff of the JPKF left its command. After the Russo-Georgian War, the Joint Peacekeeping Force ceased to exist. After the recognition of the Republic of South Ossetia by Russia, it was decided that a permanent Russian military base was needed.

Since 2006, the Georgian authorities have accused the Russian army of starting the construction of a large military base. The Ossetian authorities claimed the construction of a "tourists camping" in response to the accusations. By the beginning of the war in Georgia in 2008, according to the information of the Georgian side (in particular, according to the opinion voiced by the Head of the Georgian Ministry of Internal Affairs Vano Merabishvili), the base in Java was completed and was already used for the transfer and temporary deployment of Russian troops. According to Andrey Illarionov, former adviser to the President of the Russian Federation, this base has been used to deploy Russian military equipment since 2003, partly due to the fact that the OSCE observer mission did not have access to it.

The base was formed officially on 1 February 2009 on the basis of the 693rd Guards and 135th Motor Rifle Regiments of the 19th Motor Rifle Division based in Vladikavkaz. On 7 April 2010, Russian Defence Minister Anatoly Serdyukov and South Ossetian Defence Minister Yuri Tanayev signed an agreement on a unified Russian military base on the territory of South Ossetia. In accordance with the Russian-South Ossetian agreement, the united military base included former peacekeeping facilities in Tskhinvali, a training ground in Dzartsem, and a military camp 4 kilometer north of Tskhinvali. The Russian Airborne Troops also established an active military base outside of Java. The period of operation of the base is 49 years, with the possibility of automatic renewal for subsequent 15-year periods. On 16 December 2011, the 4th Guards Military Base was awarded the Order of St. George by President Medvedev. In 2012, it was planned to form the so-called "Ossetian Battalion" recruited from among the Armed Forces of South Ossetia as part of the base. On 31 March 2017, a military agreement was signed in Moscow, envisaging the integration of parts of the South Ossetian forces in Russia's 4th Guards Military Base, while the size of its remaining contingents was to be agreed with the Russian authorities.

=== 2022 Russian invasion of Ukraine ===
On 16 March 2022, local South Ossetian and Russian media outlets reported that units of the 4th Guards Military Base, including local Ossetian contract servicemen, were sent to join the Russian invasion of Ukraine. According to the General Staff of the Ukrainian Armed Forces, they were organized into three battalion tactical groups, with a total number of 1,200 Russian and Ossetian servicemen, for the deployment in Ukraine. Ossetians being sent as part of the Russian troops in Ukraine was confirmed, on 20 March 2022, by South Ossetia's leader Anatoly Bibilov, who said, responding to critics, that he was not the one to "give the order", but he supported the deployment. On 30 March, South Ossetian social media channels, local bloggers, and politicians such as the former de facto president Eduard Kokoity reported that many Ossetian servicemen — up to 300, according to one source — had abandoned the Ukrainian battlefields, returning home "of their own free will".

== Composition ==
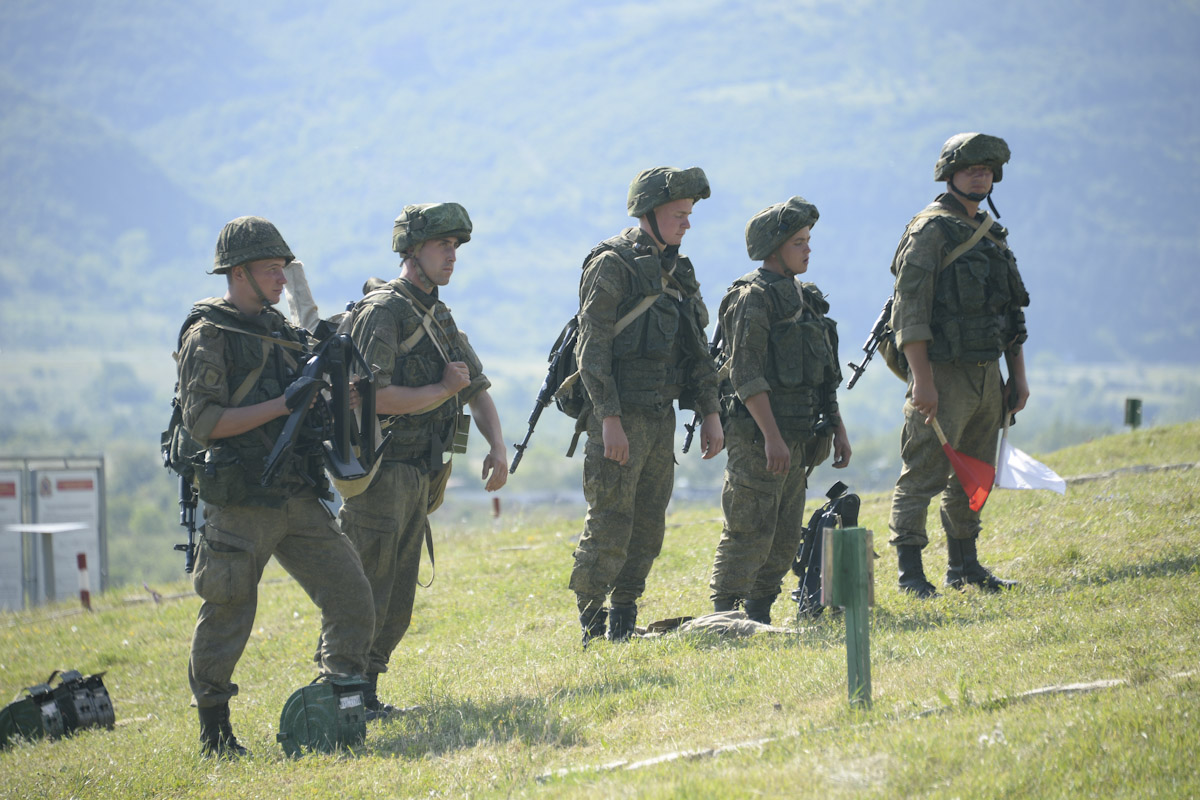
Troops of the military base during an exercise in 2017.

- Headquarters
- 1st Motorized Rifle Battalion
- 2nd Motorized Rifle Battalion
- 3rd Motorized Rifle Battalion
- Special Forces Battalion
- Sniper Company
- Tank Battalion
- 1st Self-propelled Artillery Division
- 2nd Self-propelled Artillery Division
- Rocket Artillery Division
- Anti-tank Artillery Division
- Anti-aircraft Missile and Artillery Division
- Reconnaissance Battalion
- Drone Company
- Engineering Battalion
- NBC Protection Company
- Signals Battalion
- Electronic Warfare Company
- Artillery Battery
- Radar Platoon
- Intelligence Platoon
- Repair Battalion
- Support Battalion
- Commandant Company
- Medical Company
- Instructor Platoon
- Training Platoon
- Polygon
- Military Band

== Commanders ==
- Major General Alexander Shushukin (February 2009 - October 2013)
- Colonel Mikhail Polishchuk Ivanovich (October 2013 - September 2016)
- Colonel Alexander Kravtsov (September 2016 – present)

== See also ==
- List of Russian military bases abroad
- Operational Group of Russian Forces
