= Chief of the General Staff (Abkhazia) =

- Russian: Начальник Генерального штаба Вооружённых Сил
- Incumbent; Colonel General Vladimir Savchenko since 4 November 2022
- Abkhazian Armed Forces
- Member of: General Staff
- Reports to: Minister for Defence
- Appointer: President of Abkhazia
- Term length: No fixed length
- Precursor: Chief of the General Staff Soviet Armed Forces
- Formation: 11 October 1992

The Chief of the General Staff of Armed Forces (Russian: Начальник Генерального штаба Вооружённых Сил) is the highest-ranking military officer of in the Abkhazian Armed Forces, who is responsible for maintaining the operational command of the military.

== List of Chiefs ==
No.	Portrait	Chief of the General Staff	Took office	Left office	Time in office	President	Ref.
1	Sultan Sosnaliyev	Lieutenant general Sultan Sosnaliyev (1942–2008)	11 October 1992	May 1993	6 months	Parliamentary republic	.
2	Sergei Dbar	Major general Sergei Dbar (1946–2002)	21 May 1993	June 1996	3 years	Parliamentary republic	
3	Vladimir Arshba	Lieutenant general Vladimir Arshba (1959–2018)	June 1996	2004	3 years	Vladislav Ardzinba	.
4	Anatoli Zaitsev [ru]	Lieutenant general Anatoli Zaitsev (born 1947)	<May 2005	14 April 2010	4 years, 11 months	Sergei Bagapsh	
-	Alexander Ankvab	Alexander Ankvab (born 1952); Acting	April 2010	29 March 2011	11 months	Sergei Bagapsh	.
5	Vladimir Vasilchenko	Vladimir Vasilchenko	29 March 2011	May 2015	4 years, 1 month	Sergei Bagapsh	
6	Anatoly Khrulyov	Colonel general Anatoly Khrulyov (born 1955)	18 May 2015	2 August 2018	3 years, 2 months	Raul Khajimba	
7	Vasily Lunev	Major general Vasily Lunev (born 1956)	2 August 2018	4 November 2022	4 years, 3 months	Raul Khajimba	
8	Vladimir Savchenko	Colonel general Vladimir Savchenko (born ?)	4 November 2022	Incumbent	3 years, 10 months	Raul Khajimba	

== See also ==
- Abkhazian Armed Forces
- Minister for Defence of Abkhazia
