= Marat Kulakhmetov =

Russian general (born 1959)

- Марат Минюрович Кулахметов
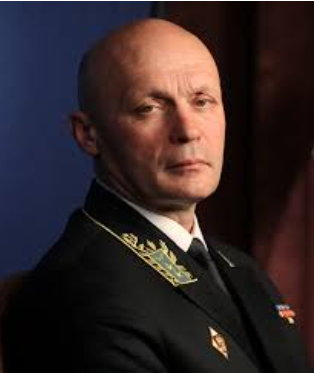
- Born: 9 February 1959 (age 67); Penza, Russian SFSR, USSR
- Alma mater: Frunze Military Academy; General Staff Military Academy
- Military career
- Allegiance: Soviet Union; Russia
- Branch: Russian Airborne Forces
- Rank: Major General
- Commands: 19th Motor Rifle Division
- Conflicts: Battle of Tskhinvali
- Awards: Order of Courage, Order of Honour, Order of Friendship, Jubilee Medal "70 Years of the Armed Forces of the USSR", Medal "For Impeccable Service", Presidential Certificate of Honour

Marat Minyurovich Kulakhmetov (Tatar: Марат Мөнир улы Коләхмәтов, Russian: Марат Минюрович Кулахметов; born 1959 in Penza) is a Major General of the Russian Army and former commander of the Joint Peacekeeping Forces in South Ossetia, a breakaway region of Georgia. He was appointed by President Vladimir Putin as Russia's ambassador to South Ossetia (occupied by Russia) in May 2017.

Kulakhmetov was born in Penza to Tatar parents. He graduated from Frunze Military Academy in Moscow in 1991. In the early 2000s, he served as commander of 19th Motor Rifle Division of the Russian Armed Forces deployed in Russia's Republic of North Ossetia. During his tenure as a commander of the Peacekeeping Forces in South Ossetia from 2004 to 2008, Georgia accused him of supporting the South Ossetian separatists and raised the question of substituting the Russian-led peacekeeping operation with an Organization for Security and Co-operation in Europe force prior to the 2008 Russo-Georgian War. From 2011 to 2017, Kulakhmetov served as an adviser to the Minister of Foreign Affairs of the Russian Federation. In May 2017, he was sent as an ambassador to South Ossetia, succeeding Elbrus Kargiev.
