= Ministry of Defence (South Ossetia) =

Ministry of Defence of South Ossetia
- Formation: 21 February 1992; 34 years ago
- Type: military agency
- Headquarters: Tskhinvali
- Location: South Ossetia
- Official language: Russian
- Minister of Defense: Colonel Inal Sabanov

The Ministry of Defense of South Ossetia (Russian: Министерства обороны Южной Осетии, МО РЮО) is a government agency of the partially recognized Republic of South Ossetia. It is the executive body in implementing defense policies in of the Armed Forces of South Ossetia. The current Minister of Defense is Colonel Inal Sabanov.

== History ==
On 17 November 1992, the Supreme Soviet of South Ossetia approved the decision "On the formation the Ministry of Defence of the Republic of South Ossetia". In January 1993, the organizational structure of the ministry was approved by the government. The first combat units of the national armed forces were formed in February 1993. The first appointed Minister of Defence was Valeriy Khubulov. The first units in the MoD was the Military Intelligence Unit and the Artillery Division.

In February 2018, festive events dedicated to the 25th anniversary of the establishment of the Ministry of Defense. Events were held from 20 to Defender of the Fatherland Day on 23 February and featured tactical drills as well as a wreath-laying ceremony at memorial monuments. An Abkhaz delegation was led by First Deputy Defense Minister Beslan Tsvizhba. Delegations were also from Russia and the Donetsk People's Republic.

== List of ministers ==
The Minister of Defense is the executive minister responsible for the management of the ministry as well as the armed forces. The following is a list of ministers of defence of South Ossetia from 1993 – present:

- Oleg Teziev (1989 – 1993)
- Valeriy Hubulov (1993 – 1996)
- Bala Bestauty (2001 – 2002)
- Zelim Muldarov (2002 – June 2003)
- Bala Bestauty (June – September 2003)
- Lieutenant General Anatoly Barankevich (2004 – 2006)
- Oleg Ivannikov (2006 – 2008)
- Major General Vasily Lunev (March 2008 – March 2009)
- Yuri Tanayev (2010)
- Lieutenant General Ibrahim Gazseev (2016 – 2022)
- Colonel Viktor Fedorov (2022, acting)
- Lieutenant-Colonel Vladimir Pukhaev (2022)
- Major-General Marat Pavlov (August 2022 – ?)
- Colonel Inal Sabanov (? - present)

== MoD structure ==
=== Units ===
The MoD maintains multiple units such as a Special Forces battalion, a training company, an infantry battalion, and a motorized rifle battalion.

==== Special Forces Battalion ====
The Special Forces Battalion named after Zelim Muldarov is part of the MoD. As an elite unit, it often takes part in live exercises to ensure its combat readiness. It participated in the Russo-Georgian War of 2008. The unit celebrated its professional holiday, the Day of the Military Intelligence Officer, on 5 November.

==== Training Company ====
The training company is a unit that was established in June 2016 and consists of conscripts. It is divided into infantry, artillery and reconnaissance platoons. Its personnel train in physical, tactical, medical, and public training among other disciplines.

==== Honour Guard ====
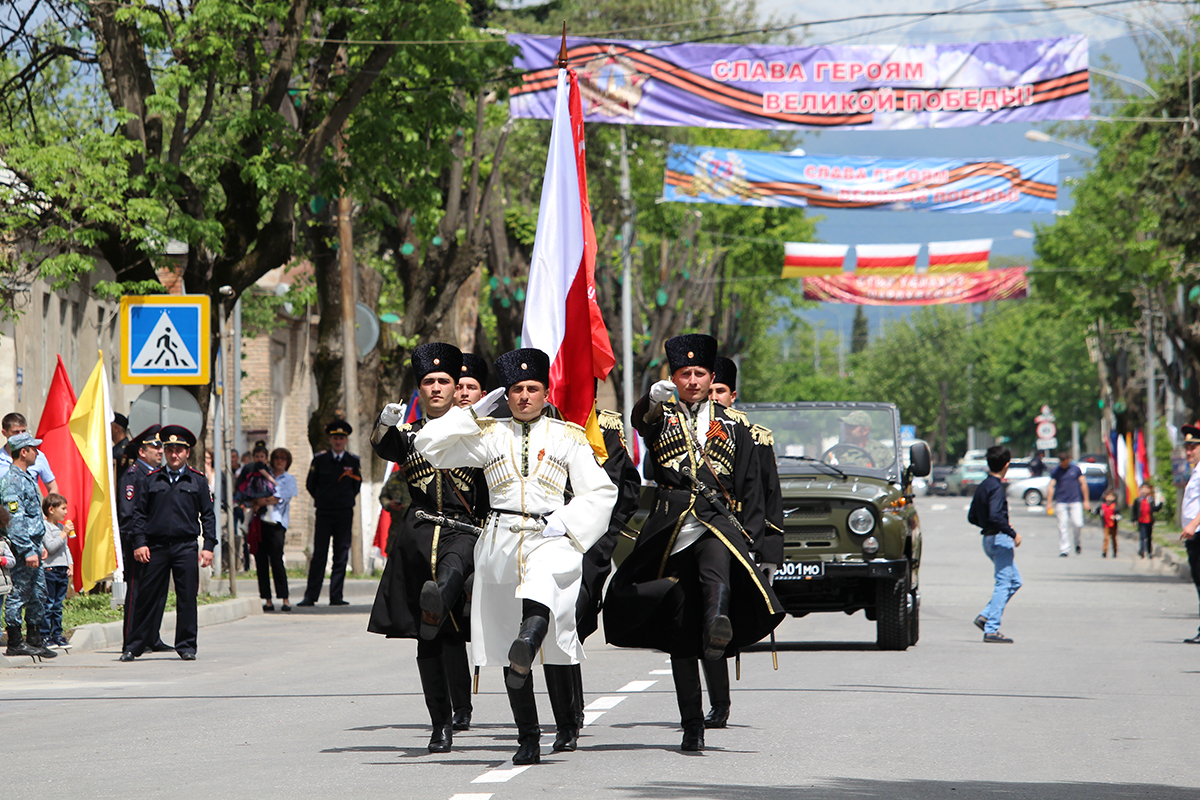
The honour guard during the Victory Day Parade in Tshkinvali 2018.

The Honour Guard Company is the ceremonial unit of the armed forces. Its uniform is similar to that of the 154th Preobrazhensky Independent Commandant's Regiment in the Russian Army. It also has a full dress uniform that is based on the clothing of the Circassians. Despite its ceremonial nature, it can also participate in military drills to ensure its combat readiness. The unit conducted a drill performance during the 2019 Republic Day parade for the first time.

==== Brass Band ====
The Brass Band of the Ministry of Defense is the only military band in the armed forces. It was formed in 1996 and is currently led by Alexander Gabaraev. Its repertoire includes Ossetia, Russian and Soviet military tunes. In April 2016, the band began recruiting musicians and increasing its instrumentation in a planned expansion of the band. It is currently attached to the motorized rifle battalion.

=== Cadet Corps ===
The cadet corps was created on 28 April 2011 by resolution of the government of South Ossetia, on the initiative of the defense ministry. It is on par with the Suvorov Military Schools in Russia, Belarus and Transnistria. Graduates of the school are given an acceleration when joining the regular army and can even go on to enroll in military/civilian universities in Russia. In June 2014, director Arthur Tadtaev of the cadet corps announced the incorporation of pupils from the 8th grade to the 10th grade.

== MoD Military Townlet ==
In 2021, the a ceremony opening of the Memorial Complex "Military Glory" in memory of the first Minister of Defense Valery Khubulov took place. A capsule with a message was installed at the base of the Memorial Complex and is planned to be opened on the day of the 50th anniversary of the formation of the Ministry of Defense on November 17, 2042.

== Awards ==
The ministry has the authority to give 4 military awards:

- Medal "For Military Merit" – Honors members of the Armed Forces of the Republic of South Ossetia, as well as citizens of South Ossetia and foreign countries.
- Medal "For Combat Commonwealth" – Honors people who merits have strengthened military cooperation.
- Medal "For Military Valour" – Honors soldiers who showed courage in the line of duty.
- Medal "Khubulov" – It honors those who actions contributed to the safety of the country. It is named after Valery Khubulov.

== See also ==
- Ministry of Defence (Transnistria)
- Ministry of Defense (Russia)
