= Liakhvi Strict Nature Reserve =

Protected nature area in Georgia (country)

- IUCN category Ia (strict nature reserve)
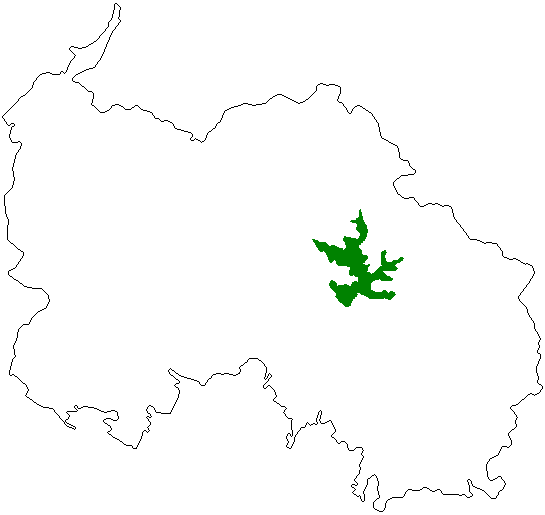
- Schematic boundaries of Liakhvi Nature Reserve.

- Location within Georgia Location within Shida Kartli
- Location: Georgia
- Coordinates: 42°23′05″N 44°15′04″E
- Area: 120.22 km^{2} (46.42 sq mi)
- Established: 1977
- Governing body: Agency of Protected Areas
- Website: Strict Nature Reserve Info

Liakhvi Strict Nature Reserve (Georgian: ლიახვის სახელმწიფო ნაკრძალი) is a protected area in the historic region Shida Kartli on the southern slope of the Greater Caucasus range in the northeastern part of Tskhinvali District and in Akhalgori Municipality of Georgia. The reserve's main goal is protecting flora and fauna in surrounding mountainous region. In general Patara Liakhvi gorge has many tourist attractions : ethnological, bird-watching and botanical.

== History ==
Historically this area is known as Shida Kartli and also as Dvaleti and Samachablo, and during Soviet period as South Ossetian Autonomous Oblast. People inhabited this territory from prehistoric times as testify Neolithic and Eneolithic monuments in Liakhvi gorge and surrounding areas. Remains of primitive man dwellings were excavated in Java District. Among these archeological discoveries most famous is Akhalgori treasure found in Ksani gorge. Akhalgori treasure is a crypt of a young noble woman, which hasn't been disturbed and was found full of adornments, ritual dishes and horse decoration. Crypt dates back to 5th - 4th century BC. Remains of cyclops fortresses are still visible in this region. In the Liakhvi gorge and it surroundings there are many early Christian monuments, such as the Nikozi basilica of the 5th century, Ksani's Armazi and Tsirkoli church built by Leon III in the 10th century, Ikorta church of the 12th century, Tiri monastery, and Largvisi residence of the Ksani nobles, with fortress and domed church of the 14th century and Dzalini castle of the 17th century. Due to ethnic conflict and war the reserve has been unattended for a long time. In 2009 Russia backed Government of South Ossetia (de facto in control) attempted to reestablish the conservation efforts and clarify protected area boundaries of Liakhvi State Reserve, but due to lack of funds this plan didn't succeed. Georgia based Provisional Administration of South Ossetia (de jure in control) is also concerned with preservation of Liakhvi Strict Nature Reserve.

== Geography ==
Liakhvi Strict Nature Reserve is located at an altitude of 1,200–2,300 m above sea level upstream of the river Patara Liakhvi and includes number of gorges, such as Gnukh gorge. For the most part this area of 6,084 hectares is covered with forest (5,283 hectares) and the rest being alpine pastures, cliffs and weathered soils. Presently protection regime is not tightly enforced at the reserve western border near the village Beloti.

== Geomorphology ==
Landscapes the Liakhvi Strict Nature Reserve were formed by sediments of the Jurassic, Cretaceous, Tertiary and Quaternary geological periods.

The Caucasus Mountains formed largely as the result of a tectonic plate collision between the Arabian plate moving northwards with respect to the Eurasian plate. As the Tethys Sea was closed and the Arabian plate collided with the Iranian plate and was pushed against it and with the clockwise movement of the Eurasian plate towards the Iranian plate and their final collision, the Iranian plate was pressed against the Eurasian plate. As this happened, the entire rocks that had been deposited in this basin from the Jurassic to the Miocene were folded to form the Greater Caucasus Mountains. This collision also caused the uplift and the Cenozoic volcanic activity in the Lesser Caucasus Mountains.

Liakhvi Strict Nature Reserve resides in Mestia-Tianeti flysch zone and Gagra-Java flysch zone and the eastern edge of Amzara-Mukhuri subzone and the central raised zones of the intermountain of the Transcaucasia at the southern slope of the Greater Caucasus range.

Geological map of the area features celestine, gypsum, nickel sulfide (milerit), phyllites with ultra alkali or alkali soil and also listwanite, and talc with lenses of serpentinites.

== Climate ==
Proximity to the Black Sea and the shield of the Caucasus Mountains puts this region on the border of the subtropical and continental climates, resulting in overall very mild climate. Elevation plays major role, on average at the lowest point of reserve about 179 frost-free days per year are observed while at reserve highest elevations on average there are 112 frost-free days per year. High amount of precipitation is typical with significant amount of snow in winter.

== Flora ==
Caucasus mixed forests of Liakhvi Strict Nature Reserve has oak groves, beech groves, hornbeam groves, birches, chestnuts, Betula raddeana, Wych elm (Ulmus glabra), cypresses, apple trees, spruce, maple, ash, alder, aspen and just a few fir groves in Patara Liakhvi gorge, with more of them in Didi Liakhvi gorge. In subalpine zone forest is dominated by Litvinov birch (Betula litwinowii) and at even higher altitude by velvet maple (Acer velutinum) and subalpine shrubbery, mainly the caucasian rhododendron (Rhododendron caucasicum).

Main species of tall grasses: Caucasalia macrophylla, Aconitum nasutum, Aconitum orientalis, Chaerophyllum bulbosum, Ligusticum alatum and also Roberts geranium (Geranium robertianum) thrive in this area.

== Fauna ==
Mammals are represented by brown bear (Ursus arctos) who roams forest and alpine pastures alike and also wild boar (Sus scrofa), Caucasian Red Deer (Cervus elaphus maral), Roe deer (Capreolus capreolus), hare, Red fox, Gray wolf, lynx, beech marten (Martes foina) and European pine marten (Martes martes), weasels, hedgehogs, field mice (Apodemus). At alpine pastures one can see threatened chamois (Rupicapra rupicapra). Brown bear (Ursus arctos) is included in the Red List of Georgia.

Patara Liakhvi gorge has many species of birds. Birds of prey are represented by rare Golden eagle (Aquila chrysaetos), common buzzard, goshawk, sparrow hawk, merlin, common kestrel and nocturnal raptors, such as tawny owl, little owl and horned owl. Woodpeckers of several species inhabit forest, and grey wagtails and dippers roam the river banks. Also numerous smaller birds live here: swallow, European goldfinch (Carduelis carduelis), wren, common blackbird (Turdus merula), raven, ring ouzel, Caucasian black grouse, Caucasian snowcock (Tetraogallus caucasicus), mountain quail.

Rivers of reserve are abound with Brown trout (Salmo trutta fario), which is included in the Red List of Georgia.

== See also ==
- Greater Liakhvi River
- List of museums in Shida Kartli
