= 42nd Army Corps (Russian Empire) =

- Country: Russian Empire
- Allegiance: Imperial Russian Army
- Engagements: World War I

The 42nd Army Corps was an Army corps in the Imperial Russian Army.

== Part of ==
- 6th Army: 1915–1916
- Northern Front: 1916–1917
