= 4th Infantry Brigade (Georgia) =

- მეოთხე მექანიზირებული ბრიგადა
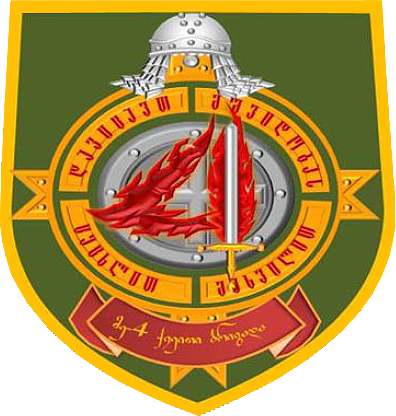
- Active: 1991 (original unit); 2004 (modern unit)
- Country: Georgia
- Branch: Georgian Land Forces
- Type: Light Infantry
- Part of: Army Eastern Command
- Garrison/HQ: Vaziani Military Base, Georgia
- Engagements: Military history of Georgia

Commanders
- Notable commanders: Gigi Kalandadze

Insignia
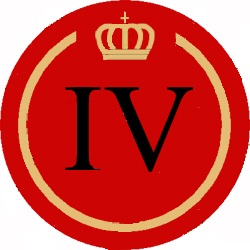
- Old brigade insignia

The 4th Infantry Brigade (Georgian: მე-4 ქვეითი ბრიგადა, romanized: me-4 kveiti brigada) is a military unit of the Georgian Land Forces, created in 2004, that is subordinate to the Army Eastern Command.

== History ==
The unit has its origins in the 1st Operational Regiment of the Internal Troops, formed in 1991. In 1992–1993, the 1st Operational Regiment was transformed into the 1st Operational Brigade, in 2004 it was renamed the 4th Infantry Brigade. Abulk of former Internal Troops of Georgia personnel formed part of the 4th Infantry. In 2013, it was transformed into the 4th Mechanized Brigade.

== Operations ==
During the Russo-Georgian War, it took part in combat operations of 2008, where, according to the assessment of the Ministry of Defense of Georgia, "the personnel demonstrated high professionalism and combat training". In this war, the brigade lost 41 servicemen killed and 16 were declared missing. In 2007, the personnel of the brigade went through the pre-deployment training program in Iraq, however due to the war between Russia and Georgia in August 2008, they could not go to Iraq. More than 1,000 Georgian soldiers were deployed at the Battle of Tskhinvali, with the biggest loss being taken by the 4th Brigade, under Major Gigi Kalandadze, at the end of the week.

== Structure ==
- Headquarters
- 41st Infantry Battalion
- 42nd Infantry Battalion
- 43rd Infantry Battalion
