= 19th Motor Rifle Division =

Russian Ground Forces formation

19th Rifle Division (1922–1957) 92nd Motor Rifle Division (1957–1965) 19th Motor Rifle Division (1965–2009, 2020–Present)
- 19-я мотострелковая Воронежско-Шумлинская Краснознамённая, орденов Суворова и Трудового Красного Знамени дивизия
- Shoulder sleeve patch
- Active: 1922–2009; 2020–present
- Country: USSR; Russia
- Branch: Soviet Army; Russian Ground Forces
- Type: Mechanized infantry
- Size: Division
- Part of: 58th Guards Combined Arms Army; Southern Military District
- Garrison/HQ: Vladikavkaz
- Engagements: World War II; Battle of Moscow; First Chechen War; First Battle of Grozny; Second Chechen War; Russo-Georgian War; Russo-Ukrainian War; Invasion of Ukraine; 2023 Ukrainian counteroffensive
- Decorations: Order of the Red Banner; Order of the Red Banner of Labour; Order of Suvorov, 2nd Class

Commanders
- Current commander: Colonel Dmitri Ivanovich Uskov

The 19th Voronezh-Shumlinskaya Red Banner Order of Suvorov and Red Banner of Labor Motor Rifle Division (Russian: 19-я мотострелковая Воронежско-Шумлинская Краснознамённая, орденов Суворова и Трудового Красного Знамени дивизия, romanized: 19-ya motostrelkovaya Voronezhsko-Shumlinskaya Krasnoznamonnaya, ordenov Suvorova i Trudovogo Krasnogo Znameni diviziya), is a division of the Russian Ground Forces. It appears to have been formed originally in July 1922 at Tambov in the Moscow Military District as a territorial formation. In 1923, it was awarded the "Tambov" placename and renamed the 19th Voronezh Rifle Division. The division was downsized to a brigade in 2009 and reestablished as a division in 2020.

== History ==
The current 19th Division was the first in the Workers' and Peasants' Red Army to be awarded the Order of the Red Banner of Labor, and distinguished itself during the Great Patriotic War, during which the unit fought in the Battle of Moscow, in battles for the cities of Yelnya and Pskov. By the beginning of World War II, the unit consisted of the 32nd, 282nd, and 315th Rifle, 90th Artillery, and the 103rd Howitzer Artillery Regiment. The division entered combat against the Germans on July 19, 1941, near Yelnya as part of the 24th Army of the Western Front. It participated in the Elninskaya offensive, the Battle of Moscow, Rzhev-Vyazma offensive operation in 1942, the Rzhev-Sychevka offensive, Kharkiv defensive operation in 1943, Belgorod-Khar'kov Offensive Operation (3 August 1943 - 23 August 1943).

As part of the 7th Guards Army, it fought in the Poltava-Kremenchuk offensive, the Pyatihatskoy offensive, Bereznegovatoe-Snigirevskaya Offensive, Odessa offensive, at Chisinau, Izmail offensive, Belgrade Offensive 1944 Derskoy offensive, Bratislava–Brno Offensive.

It participated in the liberation of the cities Elnya, Ruza, Krasnograd, Bobrynets, Bratislava, Shumla liberated September 9, 1944. For exemplary performance of command assignments in Bulgaria it was given the honorary name "Shumlinskoy" on 27 September 1944. It crossed the Seversky Donets, Ingulets, Dniester, Prut, Southern Bug, Dnieper, and Danube rivers. During the Belgrade operation in October 1944 the division entered Yugoslavia, and in November, crossed the Danube River near Apatin and in difficult, forested terrain during Battle of Batina led fierce battles with the Nazis on the left bank. In 1944 it fought through Romania, Bulgaria, Yugoslavia, Hungary, and Czechoslovakia, where it ended the war. For its courage in these battles and military skill the division was awarded the Order of Suvorov 2nd degree (January 6, 1945).

External image
- Map of the division's fighting path

During the war it served successively with the 24th, 43rd, 5th, 20th, 3rd Guards Tank, 57th, 37th, 7th Guards, and 46th Armies.

In 1945, the division arrived in the Stavropol Military District and was stationed in Vladikavkaz. In May–June 1946, the division was reorganised into the 11th Separate Rifle Brigade. All battalions of the brigade were stationed in Ordzhonikidze (which was renamed Vladikavkaz in 1990). On 1 July 1949 the 11th Separate Rifle Brigade was reorganised as the 19th Mountain Rifle Division, 12th Mountain Corps. On May 31, 1954, the 19th Mountain Division was renamed the 19th Rifle Division. In March 1957 the 19th Rifle Division was reorganized as the 92nd Motor Rifle Division. According to the USSR Minister of Defense Order No. 00147 of November 17, 1964, in order to preserve the martial traditions, the 92nd Motor Rifle Division was renamed the 19th Motor Rifle Division. Thus in 1965 it became again the 19th Motor Rifle Division.

It arrived in the Caucasus region by the mid-1950s and has been stationed for many years at Vladikavkaz. In the late 1980s it was part of the 42nd Army Corps at Volgograd and consisted of the 397th Tank Regiment, and the 201st, 429th, and 503rd Motor Rifle Regiments.

=== Chechen Wars ===
After the collapse of the USSR, the division took part in the first and the second Chechen war. During the winter of 1994-1995, the division, as part of the "West" group stormed Grozny in First Chechen War as part of the "West" group under the command of Major General Valery Klimovich Petruk. The group "West" also included paratroopers from the 21st Airborne Brigade battalion and the 76th Guards Airborne Division combined regiment.

At 7:30 on January 2, the vanguard of the 693rd regiment of Colonel Kandalin entered the city of Grozny and until 12:00 the regiment did not encounter any resistance from Dudayev's men. Due to a number of serious mistakes made by the division commander, the 693rd regiment was stopped in the market area and attacked by superior Chechen forces; under their pressure, the regiment retreated to the Lenin Park of Culture and Recreation. By 18:00, during a fierce battle, the 693rd regiment was surrounded in the area of Lenin Park, where contact with it was lost.

On February 22, 1996, a battle took place in the Assinskoye Gorge. A battalion of the 693rd Guards Motorized Rifle Regiment, which had left Vladikavkaz for Chechnya to rotate troops (according to other sources, with the task of capturing the settlement of Bamut), was attacked by militants in Ingushetia in the area of the settlements of Galashki and Arshty. The fighting continued between February 22 and 24. Among the dead was the battalion commander, Major Eduard Tinikashvili. On March 21, 1996, the 693rd Regiment stormed the settlement of Stary Achkhoy.

From March 5 to March 22, 2000, the 503rd Guards Motor Rifle Regiment of the 19th Motor Rifle Division took part in the battles for the village of Komsomolskoye.

=== Wars in Ossetia and Ukraine ===
On August 8, 2008, elements of the 19th Motor Rifle Division (at least 503rd Motor Rifle Reg.) entered South Ossetia. In 2009, as part of the wider restructuring of the Russian Ground Forces the division became the 19th Separate Motor Rifle Brigade which was formed from the 503rd Guards Motor Rifle Regiment of the 19th Motor Rifle Division. The 4th Guards Military Base was formed on the basis of the 693rd and 135th Motor Rifle Regiments in the territory of the Republic of South Ossetia. The brigade inherited all the awards, honorary titles and military glory of the 19th Motorized Rifle Division, formed in 1922. As a result, the brigade celebrated its anniversaries on July 22.

On December 1, 2020, the brigade was reorganized into the 19th motorized rifle division as part of the 58th Combined Arms Army, Southern Military District. Its permanent deployment point is the city of Vladikavkaz in the Republic of North Ossetia. It was reportedly planned to re-equip the division with T-90M main battle tanks. During the Russian invasion of Ukraine, members of the division's 503rd Motor Rifle Regiment were captured in the village of Malynivka in the Zaporizhzhia Oblast in March 2022 by Ukrainian territorial defense fighters.

== Structure ==
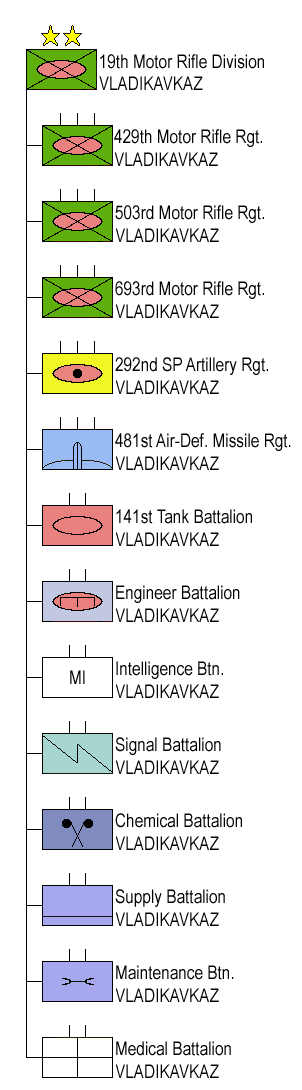
Structure of the 19th Motor Rifle Division

=== 2009 ===
- 429th Motor Rifle Regiment
- 503rd Guards Motor Rifle Regiment (equipping with 10 BTR-82A armored personnel carriers as of 2021)
- 693rd Guards Motor Rifle Regiment
- 292nd Self-propelled Artillery Regiment
- 481st Air-Defence Missile Regiment
- 141st Tank Battalion
- Engineer Battalion
- Military Intelligence Battalion
- Signal Battalion
- Chemical Battalion
- Supply Battalion
- Maintenance Battalion
- Medical Battalion

== Personnel and equipment ==
The 19th Motor Rifle Division currently has approximately 11,000 personnel in active service.

Equipment Summary

Equipment	Numbers
Main Battle Tanks	120 (T-72)
APC & IFV	330
Self Propelled Artillery	72 (2S3 Akatsiya)
Multiple Rocket Launchers	16

== Commanders ==
- 12/20/1958 - 09/21/1961 - Colonel Allenykh, Sergei Ivanovich
- 12/19/1961 - 07/27/1966 - colonel, from 02/22/1963 major general Rykalov, Fedor Ivanovich
- 07/27/1966 — 12/06/1971 — Colonel, from 10/25/1967 Major General Myakushko, Vladimir Yakovlevich
- 01/13/1972 — 11/27/1975 — Colonel, from 11/4/1973 Major General Kashin, Aleksandr Alekseevich
- 11/27/1975 — 1983 — Colonel, from 10/27/1977 Major General Shipilov, Vladimir Petrovich
- 1983-1985 — Colonel Roshchin, Viktor Mikhailovich
- 1989-1992 — Major General Petruk, Valery Klimovich
- 1992-1994 — Major General Bozhko, Stanislav Vasilyevich
- 1994-1995 — Colonel Kandalin, Gennady Ivanovich
- 1995-1996 — Major General Prizemlin, Vasily Vasilyevich
- 1997-2000 — Colonel (from 02/17/1999 - Major General) Bugaev, Dmitry Leonidovich
- 2000-2001 - Major General Titov, Vladimir Mikhailovich
- 2001-2003 - Major General Dvornikov, Alexander Vladimirovich
- 2003-2004 - Major General Kulakhmetov, Marat Minyurovich
- 2004-2007 - Major General Tonkoshkurov, Vasily Petrovich
- 2007-2008 - Major General Sudakov Sergey Gennadievich
- 2009-2010 - Colonel Davydov Denis Vladimirovich
- 2010-2014 - Colonel (since 13.06.2013 — Major General) Kisel, Sergei Aleksandrovich
- 2014-2017 - Colonel Abachev, Esedulla Abdulmuminovich
- 2017-2020 - Colonel Vyazovsky, Roman Yuryevich
- 2021–present - Major General Uskov, Dmitry Ivanovich

== Gallery ==
Units of the 19th separate motorized rifle brigade at the Tarsky training ground on January 9, 2019

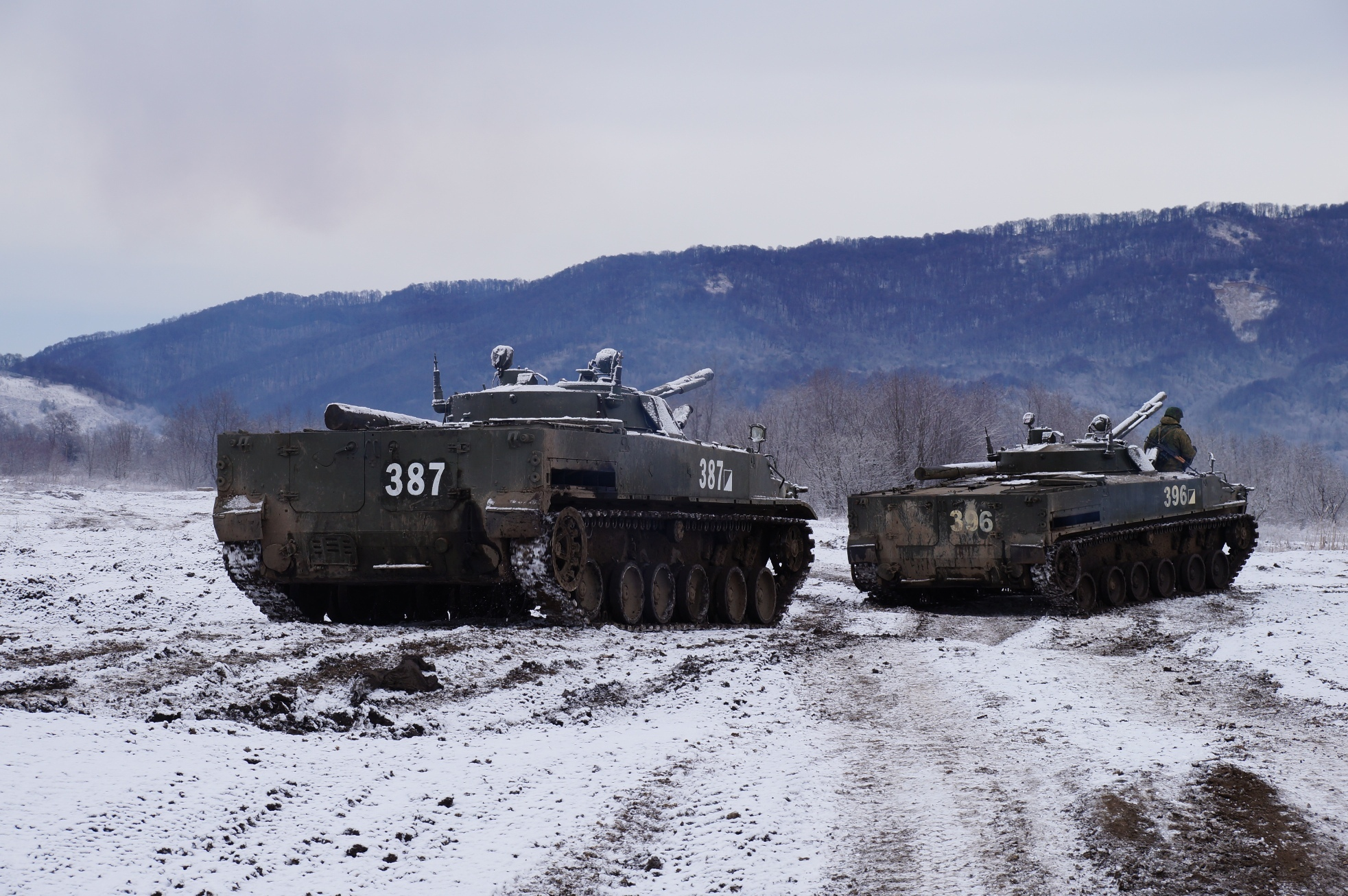

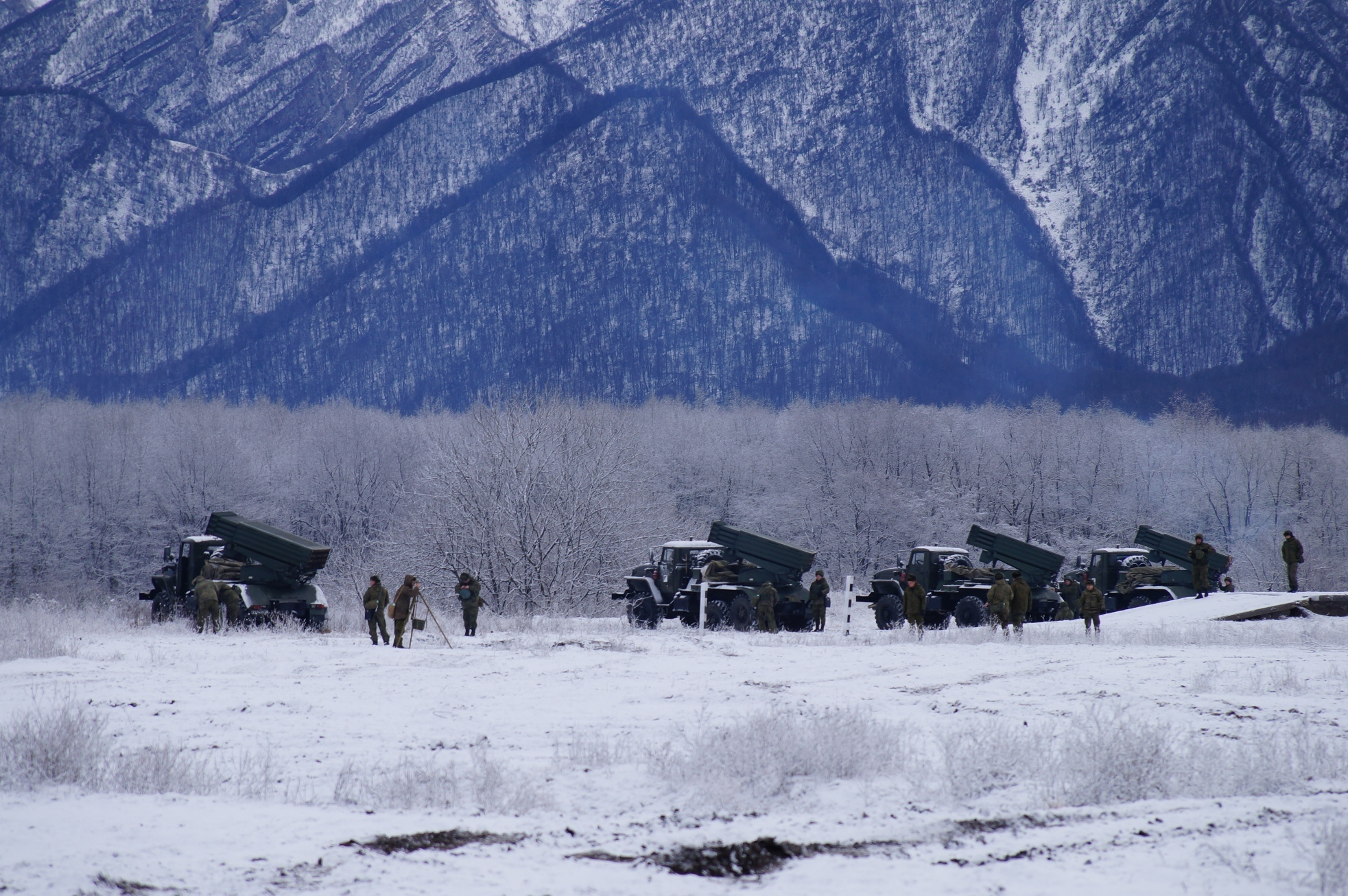

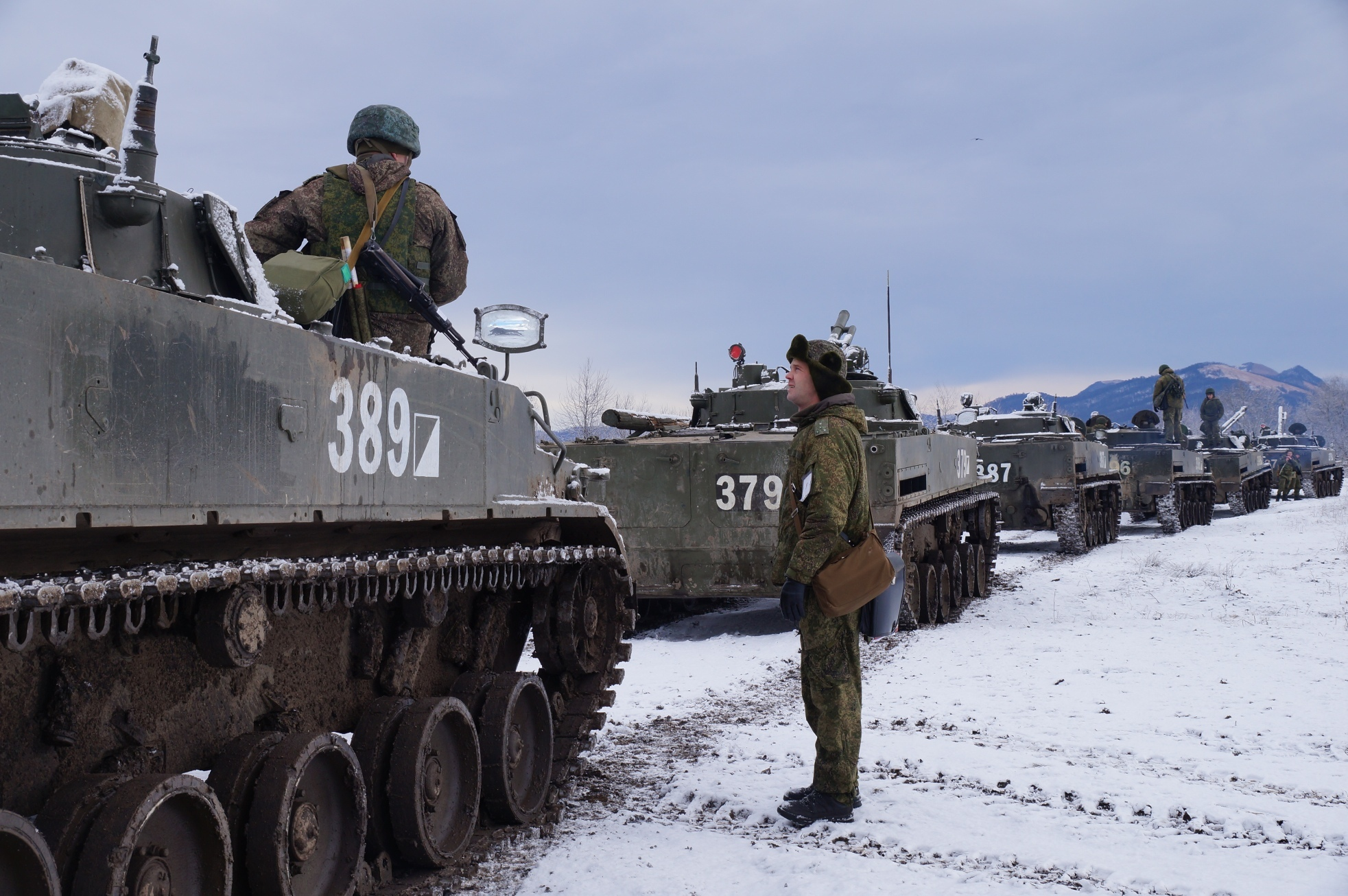

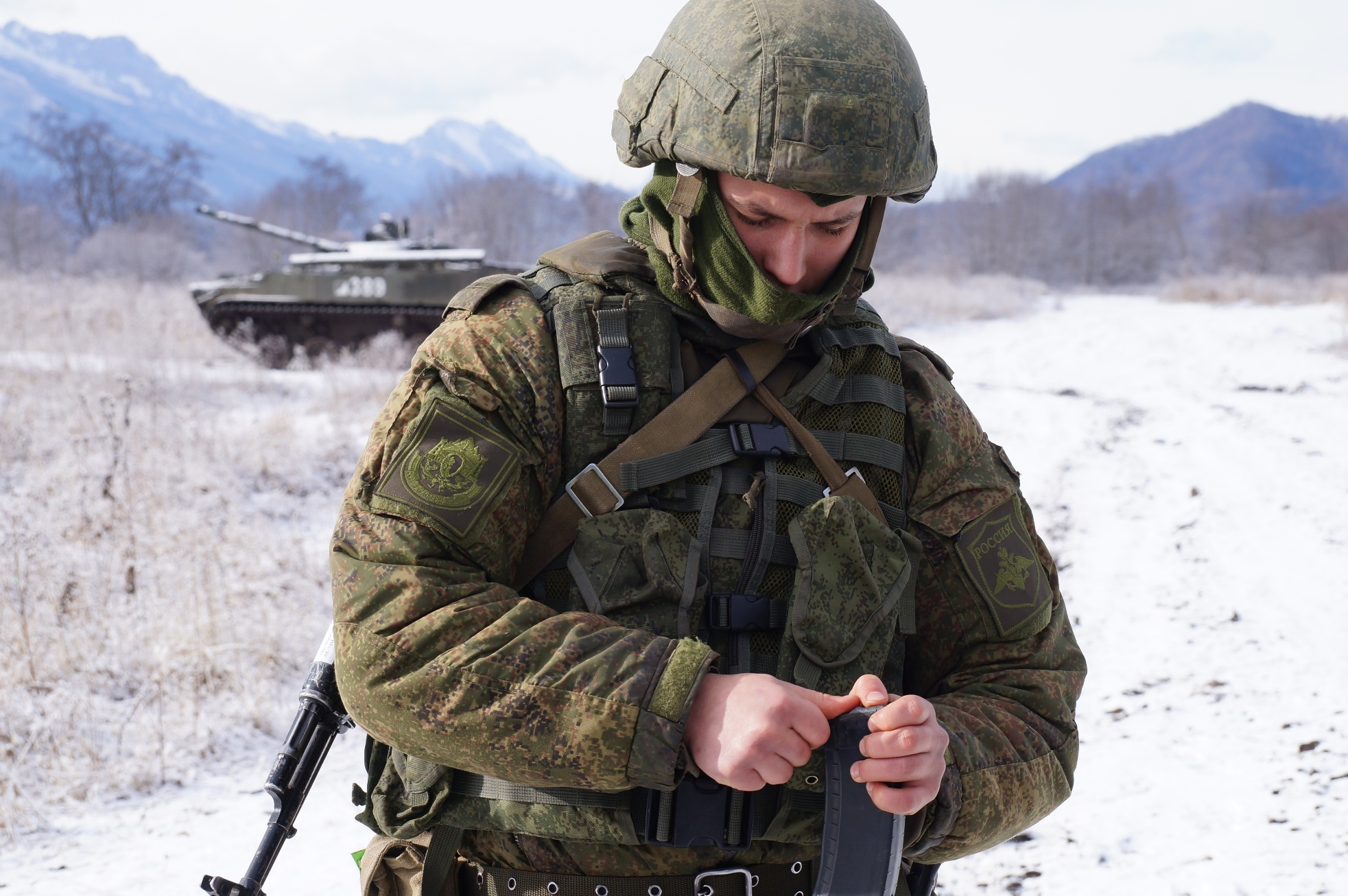

== Notes ==
- Feskov, V.I.; Golikov, V.I.; Kalashnikov, K.A.; Slugin, S.A. (2013). Вооруженные силы СССР после Второй Мировой войны: от Красной Армии к Советской [The Armed Forces of the USSR after World War II: From the Red Army to the Soviet: Part 1 Land Forces] (in Russian). Tomsk: Scientific and Technical Literature Publishing. ISBN 9785895035306.
- Michael Holm, 19th Motor Rifle Division
