= Mamuka Kurashvili =

Georgian brigadier general

- მამუკა ყურაშვილი
- Born: January 17, 1970 (age 56); Georgian SSR, Soviet Union
- Military career
- Allegiance: Soviet Union; Georgia
- Branch: Soviet Army; Georgian Land Forces
- Service years: 1988–present
- Rank: Brigadier general
- Commands: Georgian MC battalion in South Ossetia; Georgian peacekeeping forces and efforts in South Ossetia and Abkhazia
- Conflicts: Georgian Civil War; South Ossetia war (1991–1992); War in Abkhazia (1992–1993); War in Abkhazia (1998); Russo-Georgian War

Mamuka Kurashvili (Georgian: მამუკა ყურაშვილი) (born January 17, 1970) is a Georgian military officer and Deputy Chief of Joint Staff of the Georgian Armed Forces since May 7, 2009. Prior to his current position, he served as a chief of staff of peacekeeping operations in Georgia's conflict zones in Abkhazia and South Ossetia.

Kurashvili finished faculty of law of Tbilisi State University in 1996 and Moscow Malinovsky Military Academy in 1999.

After finishing service in the Soviet Army he began his military career in National Guard of Georgia in 1990. He served at various senior positions in Georgian army including Deputy Chief of the National Guard Security Group (1991–1993), Commandant of Tbilisi Military Garrison (2004–2005), Chief of Special Operation Brigade of Ministry of Defense (2005) and Commander of Georgian peacekeeping battalion in structure of the mixed peacekeeping forces in the Georgian–Ossetian conflict zone (2006–2007).

On August 7, 2008, at the beginning of Russo-Georgian War, he informed his Russian counterparts about the imminent military operation before announcing to Rustavi 2 television that Georgian forces were moving to "establish constitutional order in the Ossetian region." He later described his comment as "not authorized by seniors" and "impulsive" and "not prepared". Kurashvili was reprimanded by Georgian Defense Ministry because of the statement. He was wounded during the war.

On October, 28, during the hearings by Georgian parliament special commission, studying the Russo-Georgian War, he claimed that Russian peacekeepers positions in South Ossetia were destroyed by the Russian military, and not Georgian artillery shelling.

On May 6, 2009, according to the order of the Minister of Defense of Georgia Mamuka Kurashvili was moved from position of Deputy Head of the General Inspection of Ministry of Defense to Deputy Chief of the Joint Staff of 0GAF.

Kurashvili served as the military attaché to Ukraine from September 2009 to 2011, and has been awarded with Vakhtang Gorgasali Order (3rd Rank), Medal for Military Courage and Medal of Military Honor.
