= Java, South Ossetia =

Java ჯავა Дзау
- Town
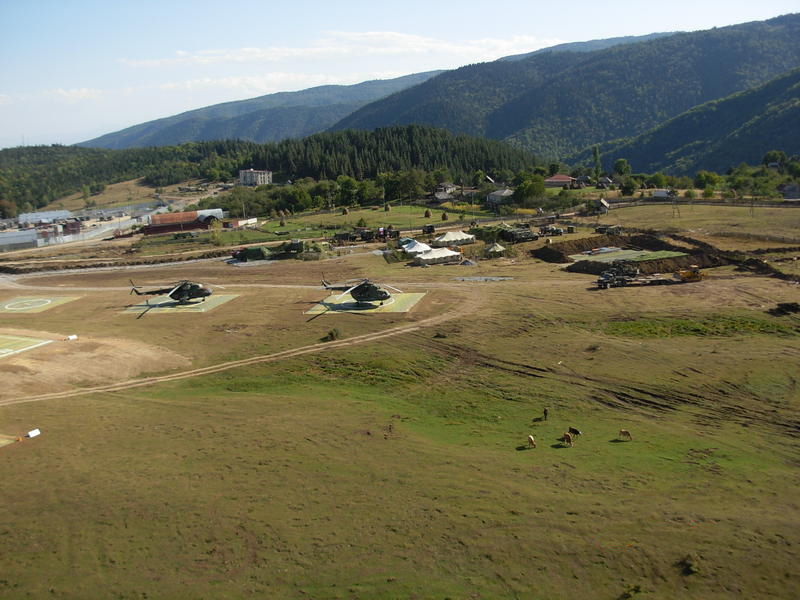
- A Russian military base in Java in 2008
- Interactive map of Java
- Location within South Ossetia Location within Georgia Location within Shida Kartli
- Coordinates: 42°23′25″N 43°55′25″E
- Country: Georgia
- De facto state: South Ossetia
- Mkhare: Shida Kartli
- District: Dzau
- Elevation: 1,040 m (3,410 ft)

Population
  - Total: 1,500
- Time zone: UTC+4 (Georgian Time)
  - Summer (DST): UTC+5

Java or Dzau (Georgian: ჯავა [dʒava]; Iron Ossetic: Дзау, Dzaw; Russian: Джава Dzhava) is a town of approximately 1,500 people in the disputed de facto independent Republic of South Ossetia, internationally considered part of Shida Kartli, Georgia (except by the Russian Federation and four other UN member states). According to Georgia's current official administrative division, Java is a main town of Java district in the north of Shida Kartli region. According to the South Ossetian side Dzau is an administrative center of Dzau district. The town is situated on the southern slopes of the Greater Caucasus, within the Greater Liakhvi Gorge, 1,040 m (3,412 ft) above sea level.

Java is the second largest urban settlement in South Ossetia, after Tskhinvali. It is located outside the Organization for Security and Co-operation in Europe-defined boundaries of the Georgian-Ossetian conflict zone – an area within a 15-km radius of Tskhinvali.

The town played a major role in the Russo-Georgian War, with most of the South Ossetian military forces being located there at the time of the Georgian offensive. During the Battle of Tskhinvali, the government of South Ossetia relocated to Java.

Georgia had accused the Russian military of building a large military base in Java before the war. These concerns were brought by the President of Georgia, Mikheil Saakashvili, to the attention of the UN General Assembly on September 26, 2007. After the war, Russia announced it was constructing military bases in Java and Tskhinvali, which would be ready in 2010.
