= Armed Forces of South Ossetia =

Military of South Ossetia

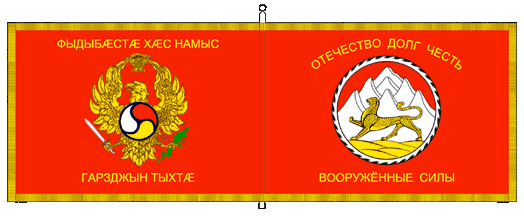
- Flag of the Armed Forces of South Ossetia

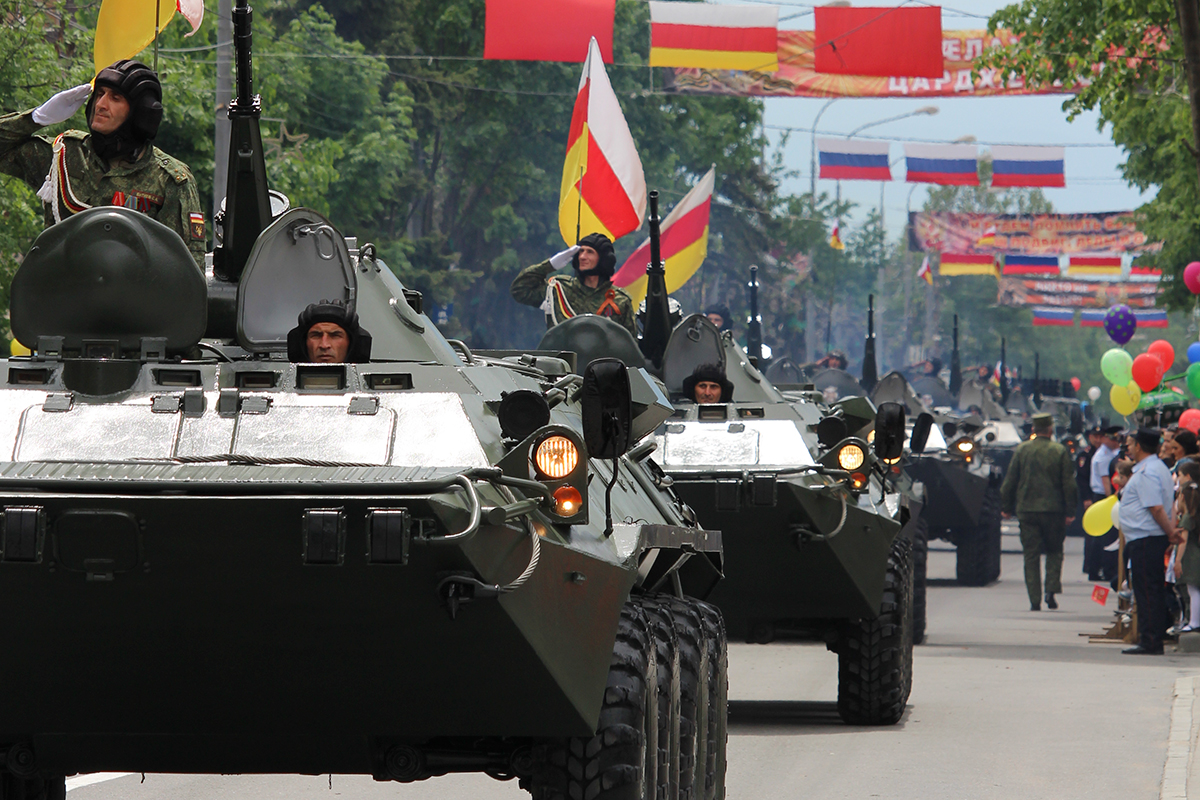
- South Ossetian soldiers on parade (2018)
- Motto: "We shall never surrender!"
- Founded: February 23, 1992
- Headquarters: Tskhinvali

Leadership
- Supreme Commander in Chief: Marat Kambolov
- Minister of Defence: Lieutenant General Yury Yarovitsky

Personnel
- Active personnel: 1,600

Industry
- Domestic suppliers: N/A
- Foreign suppliers: Russia; Soviet Union (Former)

Related articles
- History: 1991–1992 South Ossetia War; Russo-Georgian War; Georgian-Ossetian Conflict; Russo-Ukrainian War
- Ranks: Military ranks of South Ossetia

The Armed Forces of South Ossetia is the military of the partially recognised state of South Ossetia. It includes an Army and an Air Corps.

The South Ossetian Army was formed in 1992, and is the primary defense force in the breakaway republic of South Ossetia, largely considered to be within internationally recognized Georgian territory.

According to the 2017 agreement with Russia, parts of the South Ossetian forces were integrated with Russia's 4th Guards Military Base stationed in the territory, while the size of the entity's remaining military is to be agreed with the Russian authorities.

== History ==
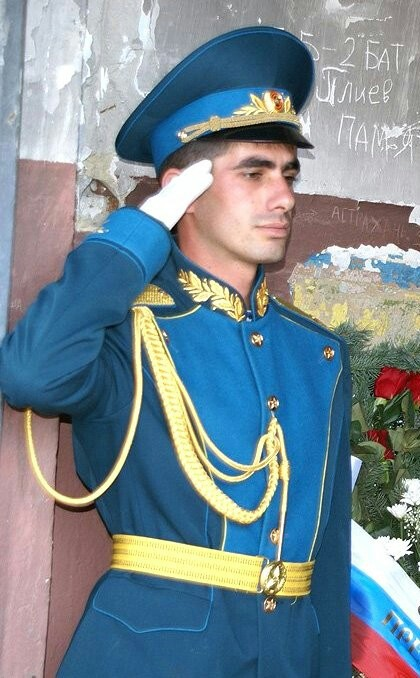
A South Ossetian soldier in 2011.

The Ossetian Republican Guard (Russian: Республиканская гвардия Осетии) was organized on 15 November 1991 to participate in the defence of the national capital of Tskhinvali. Just a week later, Georgian President Zviad Gamsakhurdia ordered over 10,000 soldiers to the republic. When it was created, it was mostly a loosely organized group of guerillas. It was a participant in the 1991–1992 South Ossetia War, providing 2,400 guardsmen to fight against forces from the National Guard of Georgia. On 17 November 1992, the Supreme Soviet of South Ossetia approved the formation the Ministry of Defence to lead the military. The first combat units of the national armed forces were formed in February 1993. The first units in the MoD was the Military Intelligence Unit and the Artillery Division.

=== 2008 South Ossetia War ===
The South Ossetian military fought against the Georgian forces in the 2008 Russo-Georgian War. At the time of the major Georgian offensive, the bulk of the Ossetian force was concentrated in the settlement of Java to the north of Tskhinvali. According to Centre for Analysis of Strategies and Technologies, what thwarted the Georgian operation in the end was the resistance offered by peacekeepers and lightly armed South Ossetian units that stayed behind to defend the capital. Also Russian regular army forces entered the fighting on August 8 and drove deep into Georgia proper, occasionally accompanied or followed by South Ossetian militia who committed serious human rights violations, particularly in the Georgian villages of South Ossetia.

According one estimate, the losses of the South Ossetian military forces, militia, and volunteers in the war amounted to 150 dead. According to a 2012 statement by the President of Russia Vladimir Putin, Russia had been training the South Ossetian militias as part of the Russian General Staff's 2006–2007 plan to rebuff Georgia in case of war.

=== Partial incorporation into Russian Armed Forces ===
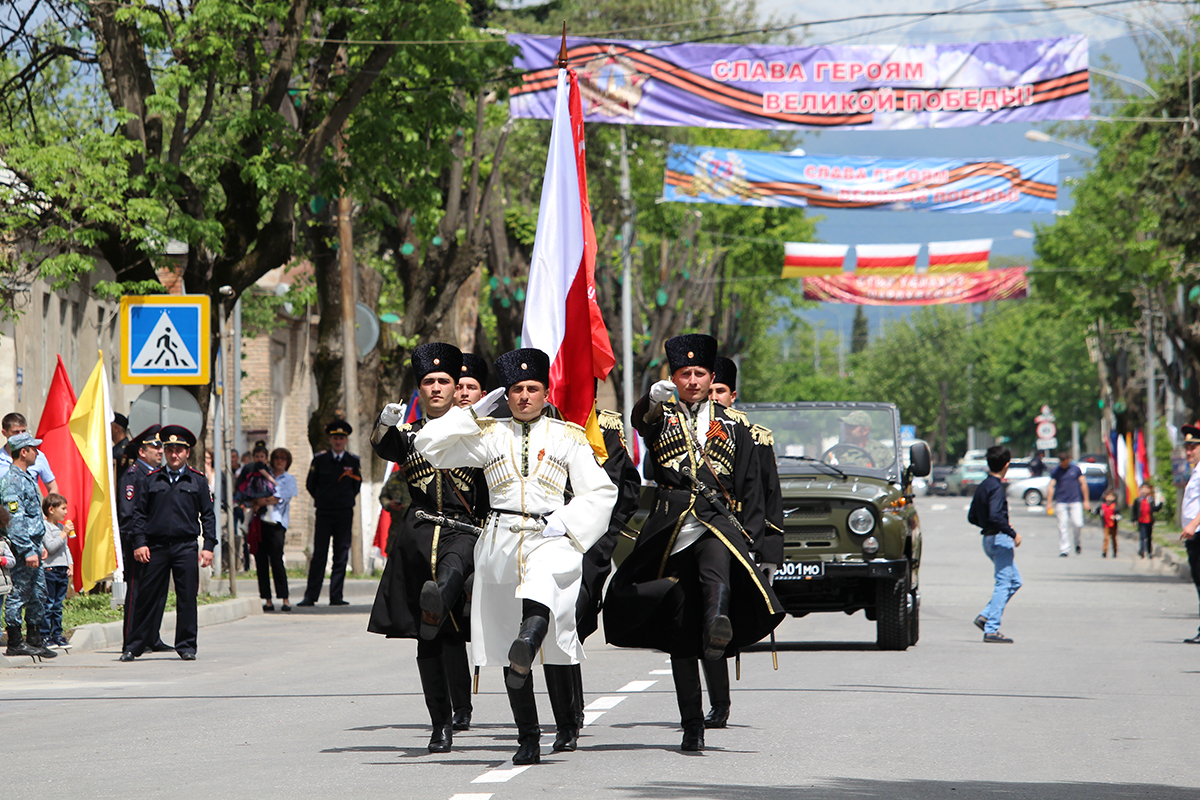
South Ossetia's color guard in 2018

In March 2015, members of the Parliament of South Ossetia put forward a proposal to dissolve South Ossetia's military and fold it into the Russian Armed Forces, but the proposal was ultimately rejected by South Ossetian President Leonid Tibilov and Defense Minister Ibrahim Gassayev. The South Ossetian units were to be incorporated into the Russian military but remain separate units.

On 31 March 2017, defence ministers of the two countries signed agreements whereby some units of the armed forces of South Ossetia would go under Russia′s command.

=== Russian invasion of Ukraine ===
On March 26, 2022, South Ossetian President Anatoliy Bibilov began sending troops whom have served in units under Russian command to Ukraine to assist Russia with its invasion of Ukraine. The Armed Forces of South Ossetia played an active role, deploying fighters to the conflict zone. These fighters participated in combat as part of the 4th Guards Military Base stationed in the region, as well as in various volunteer and mercenary groups, including "Storm Ossetia", "Alania", and "Pyatnashka".

Anatoly Bibilov consistently voiced support for the war, calling it "our operation" and emphasizing historical and cultural ties with Russia

However, morale among South Ossetian troops deteriorated over time. Reports indicate widespread desertion, particularly as it became clear that the campaign in Ukraine would be prolonged and bloody. Rising casualties further fueled panic among South Ossetia’s population, contributing to increased desertion and a decline in combat effectiveness.

== Army ==
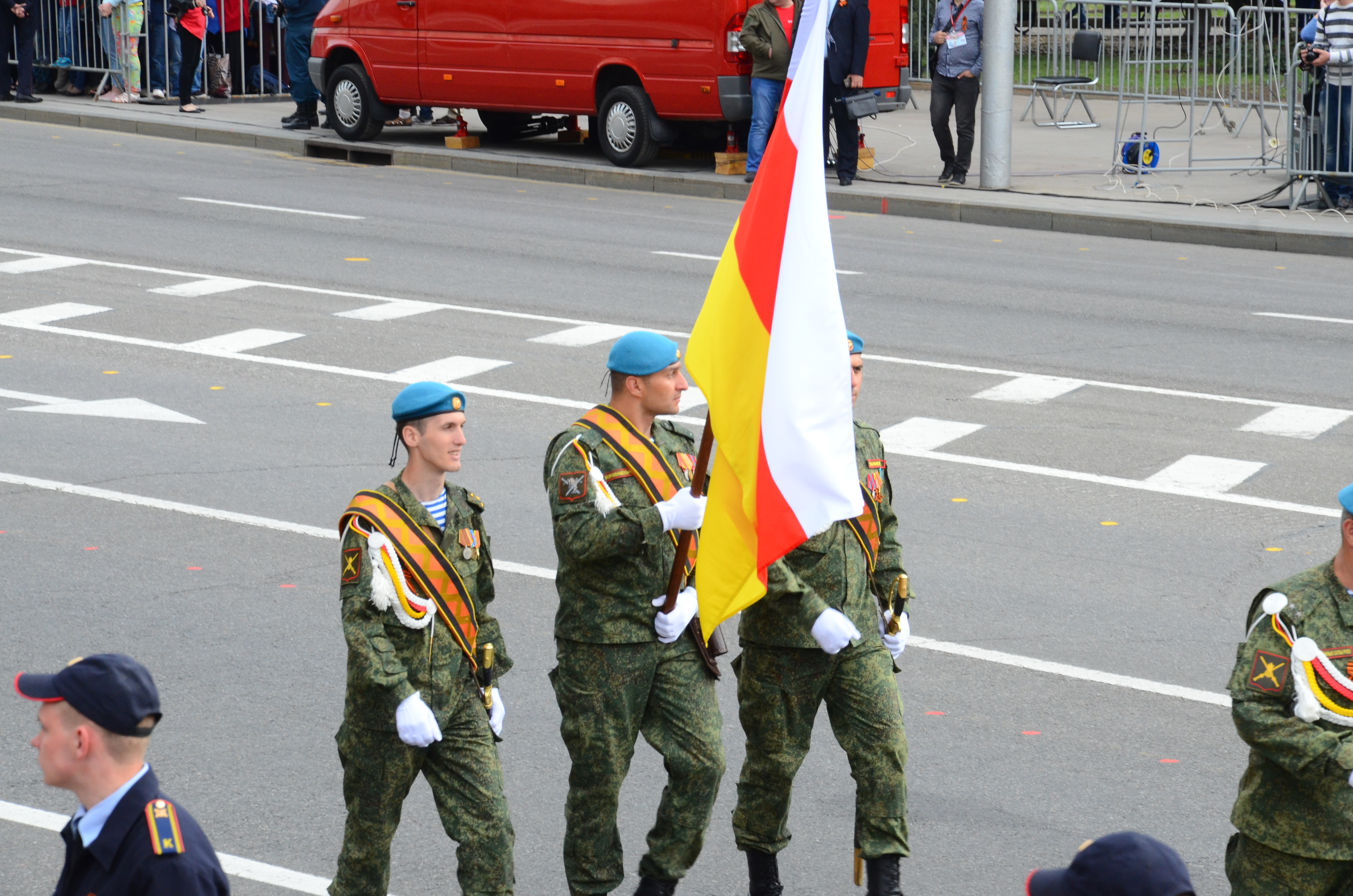
A South Ossetian military colour guard during a parade in Donetsk in 2018.

The South Ossetian military has a total of 16,000 soldiers. 2,500 soldiers are on active duty and 13,500 are reservists.

=== Formations ===
==== Army Headquarters ====
- General Staff
- Intelligence Company
- Communications Battalion
- Transport Battalion
- Special Forces Company
- Sniper Company
- Engineering Company
- Security Company
- Guard of Honour
- Military Brass Band
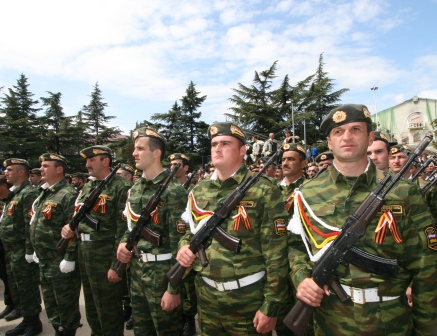
  Members of the South Ossetian armed forces during a parade in Tskhinvali in May, 2009

==== Regular Army ====
- 10 Battalion
- 11 Battalion
- 13 Battalion
- 15 Battalion
- Tank Brigade
- Logistics Brigade

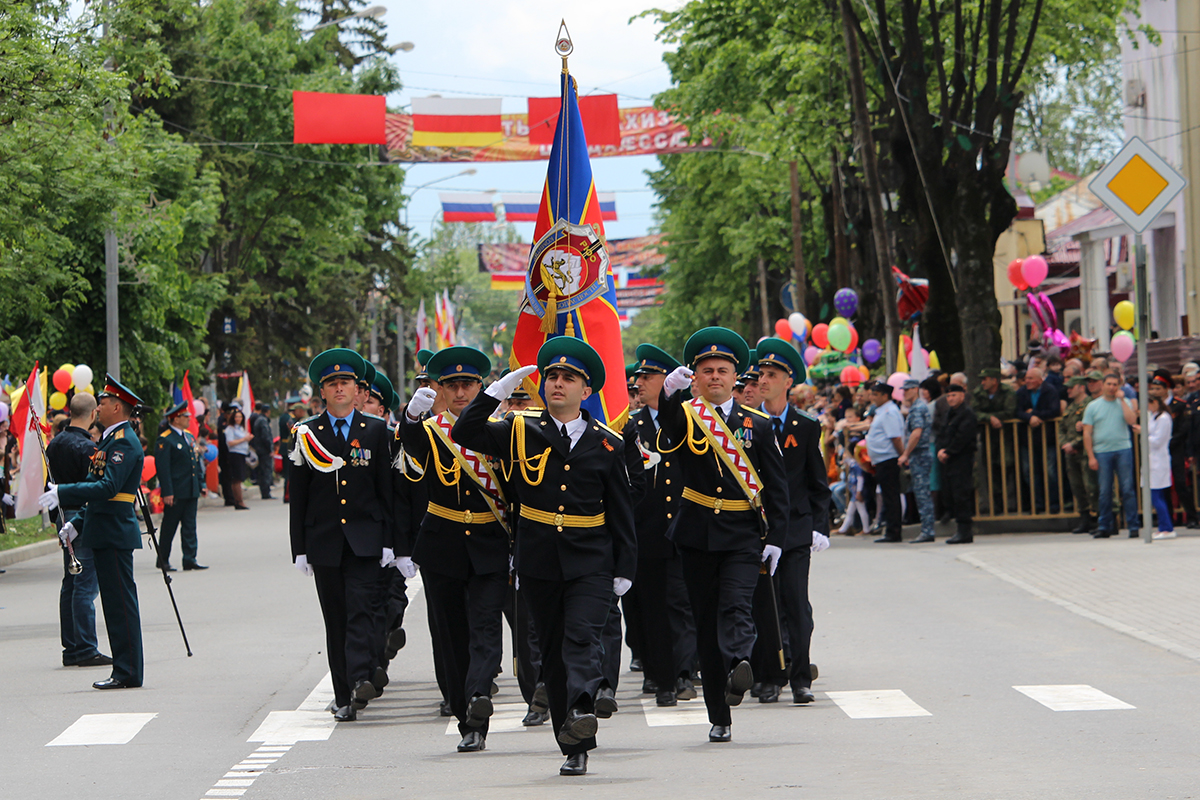
South Ossetian KGB forces parading on Theatre Square in full dress uniform.

==== Reserve Army ====
- 17 Battalion
- 18 Battalion
- 19 Battalion
- 20 Battalion
- 21 Battalion
- 22 Battalion
- 23 Battalion
- 25 Battalion
- 26 Battalion

=== Personnel and training ===
There are 2,500 active duty soldiers and 13,500 reservist members within the South Ossetian Army (SOA). Training within the SOA is conducted by both experienced South Ossetian troops and members of the Russian Airborne Troops. In August 2009 the SOA and Russia reorganized the 4 Air Mobile Brigade, as a joint forces brigade, which would have an active Russian military base in South Ossetia. This brigade has also been reported as the 4th Guards Military Base (ru:4-я гвардейская военная база). The Russian Airborne Troops are reported to have established an active military base outside of Java, South Ossetia and are reported to have trained SOA recruits since the summer of 2009.

== Uniform ==
=== Beret colours ===
- Dark Green: All Standard South Ossetian Armed Forces Personnel
- Light Blue: Russian Airborne Troops and the joint 4 Air Mobile Brigade in South Ossetia

=== Combat uniform ===
All uniforms are donated by the Russian Ground Forces, the tri-coloured Flora pattern is standard issue throughout the SOA. It is planned that the SOA will wear a variant of the Ukrainian BDU camouflage.

== Equipment ==
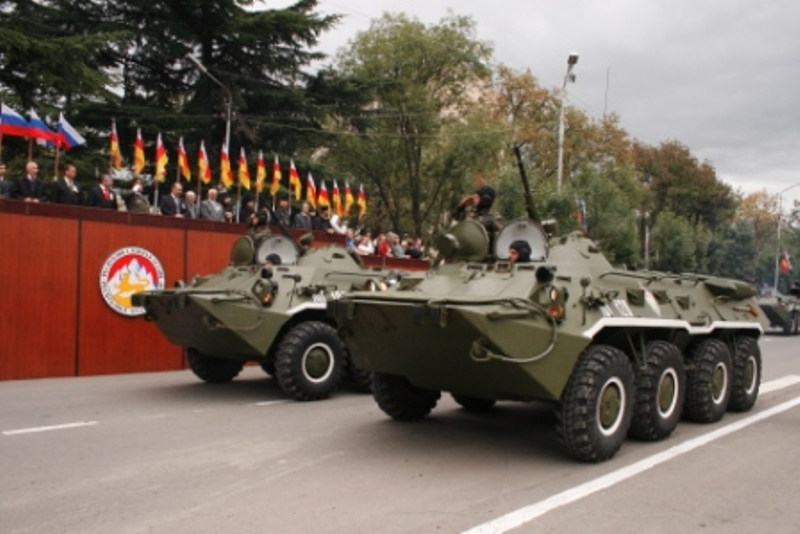
Armoured vehicles during the September, 2009 parade in commemoration of the declaration of independence in Tskhinvali

At the beginning of the 2008 South Ossetia War, the armed forces possessed the following equipment:

- 15 tanks: 5 T-55s and 10 T-72s)
- 24 self-propelled howitzers: 12 122mm 2S1 "Gvozdikas and 12 152mm 2S3 "Akatsiya"s
- 6 122mm BM-21 "Grad" multiple rocket launchers
- 12 122mm D-30 howitzers
- 4 100mm MT-12 "Rapira" anti-tank guns
- 30 mortars
- 52 armoured combat vehicles BRDM-2, BMP-1 and BTR-70
- 6 9K31 "Strela-1" mobile, short-range, low altitude surface-to-air missile systems
- 10 ZU-23-2 short-range air defense cannons
- 4 Mi-8 helicopters
- Otokar Cobra personnel carrier (captured from Georgia in the Russo-Georgian War)

After the Russo-Georgian War, some of the tanks captured from Georgia's forces have been transferred to the South Ossetian military.

=== Retired equipment ===
- IS-2 tank – phased out of service since 1995.
- IS-3 tank – phased out of service since 1995.
- T-10 tank – phased out of service since 1995.
- PZR Grom missile – captured during the Russo-Georgian War. Probably no longer in service.

== See also ==
- Abkhazian Armed Forces
- Armed Forces of Transnistria
