= Anatoly Khrulyov =

Russian general (born 1955)

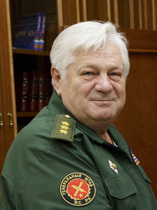
- Anatoly Khrulyov
- Born: 3 June 1955 (age 71); Naro-Fominsk, Russian SFSR, Soviet Union
- Military career
- Allegiance: Soviet Union (to 1991); Russia (to 2010); Abkhazia
- Branch: Russian Ground Forces; Abkhazian Army
- Service years: 1971–2010; 2015–2018
- Rank: Colonel General
- Commands: 58th Army
- Conflicts: Russo-Georgian War

Colonel General Anatoly Nikolayevich Khrulyov (Russian: Анатолий Николаевич Хрулёв; born 3 June 1955) is a Russian general who was the commander of the Russian 58th Army from 2006 until his retirement in 2010. He saw service in South Ossetia during the 2008 Russo-Georgian War, in the course of which he was wounded when his military column moving into Tskhinvali was attacked by Georgian forces on 9 August 2008. On 18 May 2015, he was appointed Chief of the General Staff of the armed forces of Georgia's breakaway Republic of Abkhazia, in which position he was succeeded, 3 August 2018, by Major General Vasily Lunyov, also a career Russian officer.
