= Coat of arms of Ossetia =

Coat of arms of Ossetia may refer to

- Coat of arms of North Ossetia, a federal subject of Russia
- Coat of arms of South Ossetia, a disputed region in the Caucasus
