= For Enforcing Peace =

Ribbon

For Enforcing Peace (Russian: За принуждение к миру) is a non-governmental medal established for the participants of the Russo-Georgian War, an operation officially known in Russia as "peace-keeping operations of forcing Georgia to peace and liquidation of the humanitarian catastrophe in South Ossetia". The medal was established on 14 August 2008. The medal is awarded to the military personnel of Russian Army who directly participated in the operations, military personnel of South Ossetia and Abkhazia, civilians who actively helped conducting those operations.

The medal is a golden circle of 32 mm in diameter. The obverse of the medal depicts a column of tanks on the background of the Caucasus Mountains. On the reverse of the medal there are inscriptions For Enforcing Peace and August 2008 encircled by a laurel wreath with a five-pointed star on the top. The medal is connected to the ribbon of 24 mm width having the following stripes left-to-right: white (5 mm width), blue (4 mm width), white (2 mm width), red (2 mm width), yellow (2 mm width), blue (4 mm width) and red (5 mm width). The colors symbolize Flag of Russia and Flag of South Ossetia. The medals were expected to be ready in September 2008.

== See also ==
- Peace enforcement
