= State Anthem of South Ossetia =

State Anthem of the Republic of South Ossetia

Respublikæ Xussar Irystony Paddzaxadon gimn
English: State Anthem of the Republic of South Ossetia
- Республикӕ Хуссар Ирыстоны Паддзахадон гимн
- Coat of arms of South Ossetia
- National anthem of South Ossetia
- Also known as: «Уарзон Ирыстон!» (English: 'Dear Ossetia!')
- Lyrics: Totraz Kokaev
- Music: Felix Alborov
- Adopted: 1995

Audio sample
- 2009 official vocal recording by the consolidated male choir of North and South Ossetia (three verses): file; help

The State Anthem of South Ossetia, (Note: South Ossetia's status is disputed. It considers itself to be an independent state, but this is recognised by only a few other countries. The Georgian government and most of the world's other states consider South Ossetia de jure a part of Georgia's territory.) (Note: Iron Ossetic: Республикӕ Хуссар Ирыстоны Паддзахадон гимн, romanized: Respublikæ Xussar Irystony Paddzaxadon gimn, [resˈpublikɐ ˈχuʂːar irɘʂˈtonɘ ˈpad(d͡)zaχadon gimn]) also known by its incipit "Dear Ossetia!", (Note: Iron Ossetic: Уарзон Ирыстон, romanized: Uarzon Iryston, [ˈwarʐon irɘʂˈton]) was adopted on 5 May 1995. The lyrics were written by Totraz Kokaev, and the music was composed by Felix Alborov. It was composed before South Ossetia's de facto independence from Georgia, while both were still part of the Soviet Union.

The anthem is played at state functions, as well as South Ossetia politicians' meetings with foreign leaders and at the beginning and end of the school week.

== Lyrics ==
Ossetian original

Cyrillic script

Уарзон Ирыстон! Дӕ номы кадӕн
Лӕууӕм цырагъау мах уырдыг,
Ды дӕ нӕ уарзты ӕнусон авдӕн,
Ды – нӕ цин ӕмӕ хъыг!

Фӕхӕрӕм мах дӕ зӕххӕй ард,
Дӕ ном дын исӕм бӕрзонд,
Удуӕлдай дын кӕнӕм лӕггад,
Дӕуӕн у нӕ цард нывонд!

Базард:
Уӕ, (Note: Often sung as уӕдӕ уӕ (uædæ uæ [wɐ.dɐ wɐ], "and so, therefore, thus").) Стыр Хуыцау! Дӕ хорзӕх, Дӕ арфӕ –
Иры Уӕзӕгӕн Ды цардамонд ратт!

Уӕззау уыд дӕ ивгъуыд, Иры бӕстӕ,
Зылди дӕ фӕдыл сау фыдох,
Фӕлӕ-иу уӕддӕр дӕ фарны рӕстӕй
Кодтой дӕ зынтӕ рох.

Царды рухсмӕ ӕдзух цыдтӕ,
Фыдбонты нӕ саст дӕ ныфс,
Сӕрбӕрзонд алкӕддӕр уыдтӕ,
Ӕргомӕй размӕ цӕуыс!

Базард:
Уӕ, Уастырджи! Дӕ хорзӕх, Дӕ арфӕ –
Иры дзыллӕйӕн фӕндагамонд ратт!

Фыдӕлты ӕрдхӕрӕн, Иры Уӕзӕг!
Зӕрдӕйы тӕгтӕй дӕ нывӕзт,
Ацы дунейы нын масты уӕзӕй
Ма у дих ӕмӕ уӕрст,

Дугӕй дугмӕ нӕрӕд дӕ ном,
Бӕрзонддӕр кӕнӕд дӕ кад,
Дӕ ныфсӕй мах цӕрӕм ӕнгом,
Дӕ фӕрцы рухс у нӕ цард!

Базард:
Уӕ, Бӕсты Фарн! Дӕ хорзӕх, Дӕ арфӕ –
Нӕ уарзон Ирӕн Ды иу амонд ратт!

Ном ӕмӕ йын кад!

Latin script

Uarzon Iryston! Dæ nomy kadæn
Læuuæm cyrahau max uyrdyg,
Dy dæ næ uarzty ænuson avdæn,
Dy – næ cin æmæ qyg!

Fæxæræm max dæ zæxxæj ard,
Dæ nom dyn isæm bærzond,
Uduældaj dyn kænæm læggad,
Dæuæn u næ card nyvond!

Bazard:
Uæ, Styr Xuycau! Dæ xorzæx, Dæ arfæ –
Iry Uæzægæn Dy cardamond ratt!

Uæzzau uyd dæ ivhuyd, Iry bæstæ,
Zyldi dæ fædyl sau fydox,
Fælæ-iu uæddær dæ farny ræstæj
Kodtoj dæ zyntæ rox.

Cardy ruxsmæ ædzux cydtæ,
Fydbonty næ sast dæ nyfs,
Særbærzond alkæddær uydtæ,
Ærgomæj razmæ cæuys!

Bazard:
Uæ, Uastyrdži! Dæ xorzæx, Dæ arfæ –
Iry dzyllæjæn fændagamond ratt!

Fydælty ærdxæræn, Iry Uæzæg!
Zærdæjy tægtæj dæ nyvæzt,
Acy dunejy nyn masty uæzæj
Ma u dix æmæ uærst,

Dugæj dugmæ næræd dæ nom,
Bærzonddær kænæd dæ kad,
Dæ nyfsæj max cæræm ængom,
Dæ færcy ruxs u næ card!

Bazard:
Uæ, Bæsty Farn! Dæ xorzæx, Dæ arfæ –
Næ uarzon Iræn Dy iu amond ratt!

Nom æmæ jyn kad!

IPA transcription (Note: See Help:IPA/Ossetian and Ossetian language § Phonology.)

[war.ʐon i.rɘ.ʂton ‖ dɐ no.mɘ kʰa.dɐn]
[lɐw.wɐm (t͡)sɘ.ra.ʁaw maχ wɘr.dɘg ǀ]
[dɘ dɐ nɐ war.ʂtɘ ɐ.nu.ʂon av.dɐn ǀ]
[dɘ nɐ (t͡)sin ɐ.mɐ qɘg ‖]

[fɐ.χɐ.rɐm maχ dɐ ʐɐχ.χɐj ard ǀ]
[dɐ nom dɘn i.ʂɐm bɐr.ʐond ǀ]
[ud.wɐɫ.daj dɘn kʰɐ.nɐm lɐg.gad ǀ]
[dɐ.wɐn u nɐ (t͡)sard nɘ.vond ‖]

[ba.ʐard]
[wɐ ǀ ʂtɘr χʷɘ.(t͡)saw ‖ dɐ χor.ʐɐχ ǀ dɐ ar.fɐ ǀ]
[i.rɘ wɐ.ʐɐ.gɐn dɘ (t͡)sar.da.mond ratː ‖]

[wɐʐ.ʐaw wɘd dɐ iv.ʁʷɘd ǀ i.rɘ bɐ.ʂtɐ ǀ]
[ʐɘl.di dɐ fɐ.dɘl ʂaw fɘ.doχ ǀ]
[fɐ.lɐ.ju wɐd.dɐr dɐ far.nɘ rɐ.ʂtɐj]
[kʰod.toj dɐ ʐɘn.tʰɐ roχ ‖]

[(t͡)sar.dɘ ruχ.ʂmɐ ɐ.(d͡)zuχ sɘd.tɐ ǀ]
[fɘd.bon.tʰɘ nɐ ʂaʂt dɐ nɘfʂ ǀ]
[ʂɐr.bɐr.ʐond aɫ.kʰɐd.dɐr wɘd.tɐ ǀ]
[ɐr.go.mɐj ra.ʐmɐ (t͡)sɐ.wɘʂ ‖]

[ba.ʐard]
[wɐ ǀ wa.ʂtɘr.d͡ʒi ‖ dɐ χor.ʐɐχ ǀ dɐ ar.fɐ ǀ]
[i.rɘ (d͡)zɘl.lɐ.jɐn fɐn.da.ga.mond ratː ‖]

[fɘ.dɐɫ.tʰɘ ɐrt.χɐ.rɐn ǀ i.rɘ wɐ.ʐɐg ‖]
[ʐɐr.dɐ.jɘ tʰɐg.tʰɐj dɐ nɘ.vɐʂt ǀ]
[a.(t͡)sɘ du.ne.jɘ nɘn ma.ʂtɘ wɐ.ʐɐj]
[ma u diχ ɐ.mɐ wɐrʂt ǀ]

[du.gɐj dug.mɐ nɐ.rɐd dɐ nom ǀ]
[bɐr.ʐond.dɐr kʰɐ.nɐd dɐ kʰad ǀ]
[dɐ nɘf.ʂɐj maχ (t͡)sɐ.rɐm ɐŋ.gom ǀ]
[dɐ fɐr.(t͡)sɘ ruχʂ u nɐ (t͡)sard ‖]

[ba.ʐard]
[wɐ ǀ bɐ.ʂtɘ farn ‖ dɐ χor.ʐɐχ ǀ dɐ ar.fɐ ǀ]
[nɐ war.ʐon i.rɐn dɘ iw a.mond ratː ‖]

[nom ɐ.mɐ jɘn kʰad ‖]

English translation

Dear Ossetia! For the glory of thy name,
Erect we stand like a flambeau.
Of our love, good ol' cradle of fame,
Our joy and grief art thou!

By thine earth we swear to thee,
We honour vastly thy name,
With our might we serve thee,
Our fervor for thee came!

Chorus:
O great Khwytsaw, thy blessing and grace!
Give the land of Ossetia happiness!

Ossetian land! Thy past was darned,
Thou wert chased by baneful sins.
Yet through the truth of Farn,
Buried now are thy hardships.

Thou hast always marched
Toward the light of life.
Thy hope hath not been crushed
During desolate times of strife.

Chorus:
O Wastyrdzhi, thy blessing and grace!
Give Ossetian clan happiness!

Pride of our forebears, home of the Ossete,
Through one kindred, we're united.
In this world of sorrow through defeat,
Be not dispersed nor divided.

Through aeons may thy name echo,
Thy glory groweth with delight,
Together we live with thy hope aglow,
Thanks to thee our lives shine bright!

Chorus:
O cherished Farn! thy blessing and grace!
Blessed be our dear Ossetia!

Thine honour and glory!

== See also ==
- State Anthem of the Republic of North Ossetia-Alania
- "Aiaaira" – the national anthem of Abkhazia, another partially recognized state in the South Caucasus.
