= Emblem of the North Ossetian Autonomous Soviet Socialist Republic =

- Armiger: North Ossetian Autonomous Soviet Socialist Republic
- Adopted: 6 July 1937
- Crest: Red star
- Supporters: Wheat and Cotton
- Motto: Ӕппӕт бӕстӕты пролетартӕ баиу ут! (Ossetian) Пролетарии всех стран, соединяйтесь! (Russian) "Workers of the world, unite!"

The national emblem of the North Ossetian Autonomous Soviet Socialist Republic was adopted on 6 July 1937 by the government of the North Ossetian Autonomous Soviet Socialist Republic. The emblem is identical to the emblem of the Russian Soviet Federative Socialist Republic.

== History ==
Following the formation of the North Ossetian Autonomous Soviet Socialist Republic on 5 December 1936, the ASSR enacted its constitution on 6 July 1937. Article 111 of the constitution describes the emblem is similar to the emblem of the RSFSR, but with inscriptions in Russian and Ossetian. Additionally, the Russian SFSR and the North Ossetian ASSR is inscribed in the emblem in Russian and Ossetian. The motto Workers of the world, unite! is also inscribed bilingually. The emblem underwent a minor change following the adoption of a new constitution on 30 May 1978, with the addition of a red star on top of the emblem and minor changes in the inscription (the РСФСР inscription was widened to make it parallel to the country's name inscription and the removal of the Ossetian translation of the abbreviation of Russian SFSR, УСФСР). Major changes to the inscription occurred following the dissolution of the Soviet Union, with the country's name being changed to the North Ossetian SSR on 26 December 1990 and to the South Ossetian Republic on 9 November 1993.

== Gallery ==
1937-1978

1978-1990

== See also ==
- Flag of the North Ossetian Autonomous Soviet Socialist Republic
- Coat of arms of North Ossetia
- Emblem of the Russian Soviet Federative Socialist Republic
