= Flag of the North Ossetian Autonomous Soviet Socialist Republic =

Flag

North Ossetian Autonomous Soviet Socialist Republic
- Flag of the North Ossetian ASSR (1981–1991)
- Use: Civil and state flag
- Proportion: 1:2
- Adopted: 16 June 1954; 24 June 1981 (minor changes)
- Design: A red flag with a light-blue stripe at the pole, with golden red star and hammer and sickle.
- Designed by: Valentin Petrovich Viktorov

The flag of the North Ossetian Autonomous Soviet Socialist Republic was adopted in 1954 by the government of the North Ossetian Autonomous Soviet Socialist Republic. The flag is identical to the flag of the Russian Soviet Federative Socialist Republic.

== History ==
=== First version ===
The first Constitution of the North Ossetian ASSR was approved on July 3, 1937 by the Extraordinary 7th Congress of Soviets of the North Ossetian ASSR. The flag of the North Ossetian ASSR was described in the Article 112 of the Constitution :

The state flag of the North Ossetian Autonomous Soviet Socialist Republic is the state flag of the RSFSR, consisting of a red cloth, in the left corner of which, at the top of the shaft, are placed the golden letters "RSFSR" in Russian and Ossetian languages, with smaller letters under the inscription "RSFSR" the inscriptions "North Ossetian ASSR" in Russian and Ossetian languages.

— Constitution of the North Ossetian ASSR (1937), Article 112

==== Revision ====
On July 28, 1938, the bureau of the North Ossetian Regional Committee of the CPSU adopted a resolution on the introduction of the alphabet of the Ossetian script, starting on August 15, 1938, based on Cyrillic script. Accordingly, the inscriptions in the Ossetian language on the state flag of the North Ossetian ASSR were changed.

=== Second version ===
On June 16, 1954, the 6th session of the Supreme Soviet of the North Ossetian ASSR adopted the Law of the North Ossetian ASSR "On the State Flag of the North Ossetian Autonomous Soviet Socialist Republic", which amended Article 112 of the Constitution of the North Ossetian ASSR:

The state flag of the North Ossetian Autonomous Soviet Socialist Republic is the state flag of the RSFSR, consisting of a red cloth with a light blue stripe at the flagpole over the entire width of the flag. The light blue bar is one eighth of the flag's length. In the upper left corner of the red cloth there is a golden sickle and a hammer, and above them is a red five-pointed star, framed by a golden border. Under the hammer and sickle there is an inscription: “North Ossetian ASSR” in Russian and Ossetian languages. The ratio of the width of the flag to the length of 1:2.

— Constitution of the North Ossetian ASSR (1937, amended 1954), Article 112

On March 29, 1956, by the Decree of the Presidium of the Supreme Soviet of the North Ossetian ASSR, the Regulations on the State Flag of the North Ossetian ASSR was approved. By the Decree of the Supreme Soviet of the North Ossetian ASSR on December 28, 1967, the regulation was amended, on the days of raising the flag on state buildings and public institutions.

On May 30, 1978, the extraordinary 8th session of the Supreme Soviet of the North Ossetian ASSR of the 9th convocation adopted a new Constitution of the North Ossetian ASSR. The flag was described in Article 158 of the constitution :

The state flag of the North Ossetian Autonomous Soviet Socialist Republic is the state flag of the RSFSR, which is a red rectangular cloth with a light blue stripe at the flagpole, the full width of the flag, which is one-eighth of the flag's length. In the upper left corner of the red cloth there are golden sickle and hammer and a red five-pointed star framed by a gold border above them, and the words “North Ossetian ASSR” in Russian and Ossetian languages are placed under them in gold letters. The ratio of the width of the flag to its length - 1:2.

— Constitution of the North Ossetian ASSR (1978), Article 112

==== Revision ====
On June 24, 1981, by the Decree of the Presidium of the Supreme Council of the North Ossetian Autonomous Soviet Socialist Republic, the decree "On the State Flag of the North Ossetian Autonomous Soviet Socialist Republic" was introduced, and was approved by the law of the North Ossetian Autonomous Soviet Socialist Republic of December 16, 1981. The decree changed the inscriptions so that the inscriptions were positioned on the left side on the flag, to unify the design.

The decree also specifies the size of the letters, which is 1/16 of the flag's width, and both inscriptions has a distance of 1/25 of the width of the flag.

On September 10, 1981, the Council of Ministers of the North Ossetian ASSR approved the Instructions for the Application of the "Regulations on the State Flag of the North Ossetian ASSR".

== Gallery ==
3 July 1937 - 15 August 1938

15 August 1938 - 16 June 1954

16 June 1954 - 24 June 1981

24 June 1981 - 2 October 1991 (adoption of the Flag of North Ossetia)

== See also ==
- Emblem of the North Ossetian Autonomous Soviet Socialist Republic
- Flag of North Ossetia
- Flag of the Russian Soviet Federative Socialist Republic
