= Coat of arms of North Ossetia =

Coat of arms of the Republic of North Ossetia–Alania
- Armiger: Republic of North Ossetia–Alania
- Adopted: 1994
- Shield: Disc gules, a leopard passant or spotted sable on a ground or with a background of seven mountains argent

The coat of arms of the Republic of North Ossetia–Alania, a federal subject of Russia, is a red disc featuring a Caucasian leopard with seven white mountains in the background. The mountains symbolize the Ossetian landscape, while the leopard is an iconic inhabitant of the Caucasus mountains.

== History ==
=== Terek Oblast ===
Under the Russian Empire, the territory of present-day North Ossetia was part of the Terek Oblast. The coat of arms of the Terek Oblast was approved on 15 March 1873.

=== North Ossetian ASSR ===
The North Ossetian ASSR was formed on 5 December 1936. The 1940 edition of the constitution stated:

"The state emblem of the North Ossetian Autonomous Soviet Socialist Republic is the state emblem of the RSFSR, which consists of a golden sickle and hammer placed crosswise, handles downward, on a red background in the sun and framed by ears of corn, with the inscription 'RSFSR' and 'Proletarians of all countries, unite!' in Russian and Ossetian languages (РСФСР/УСФСР) (ӔППӔТ БӔСТӔТЫ ПРОЛЕТАРТӔ БАИУ УТ!) and the addition of, under the inscription reading "RSFSR", a smaller inscription reading 'North Ossetian ASSR' in both Russian and Ossetian languages. (ЦӔГАТ-ИРЫСТОНЫ АССР)" (Article 111).

In 1978 both the arms of the North Ossetian ASSR and the emblem of the RSFSR were modified to include a red star.

=== Republic of North Ossetia–Alania ===
On 24 November 1994 the Parliament of North Ossetia, an autonomous republic within Russian Federation, approved and enacted Act No. 521, which had the country adopt a coat of arms designed by Murat Dzhigkayev. The prototype for the emblem was based on Vakhushti of Kartli’s “Banner of Ossetia”, dated 1735.

== Gallery ==
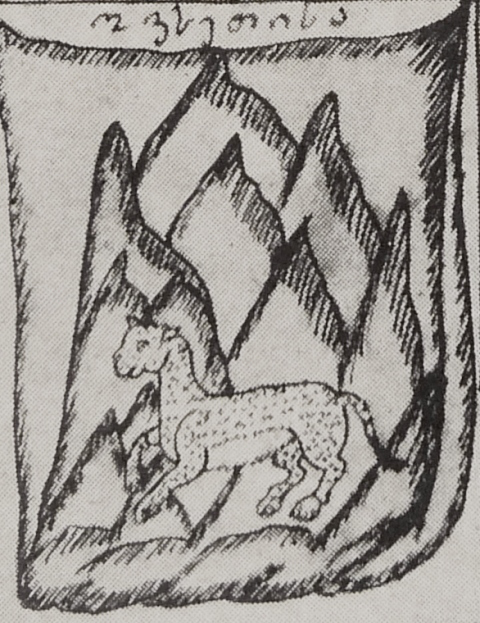
Historical Banner of Ossetia by Vakhushti of Kartli (1735)

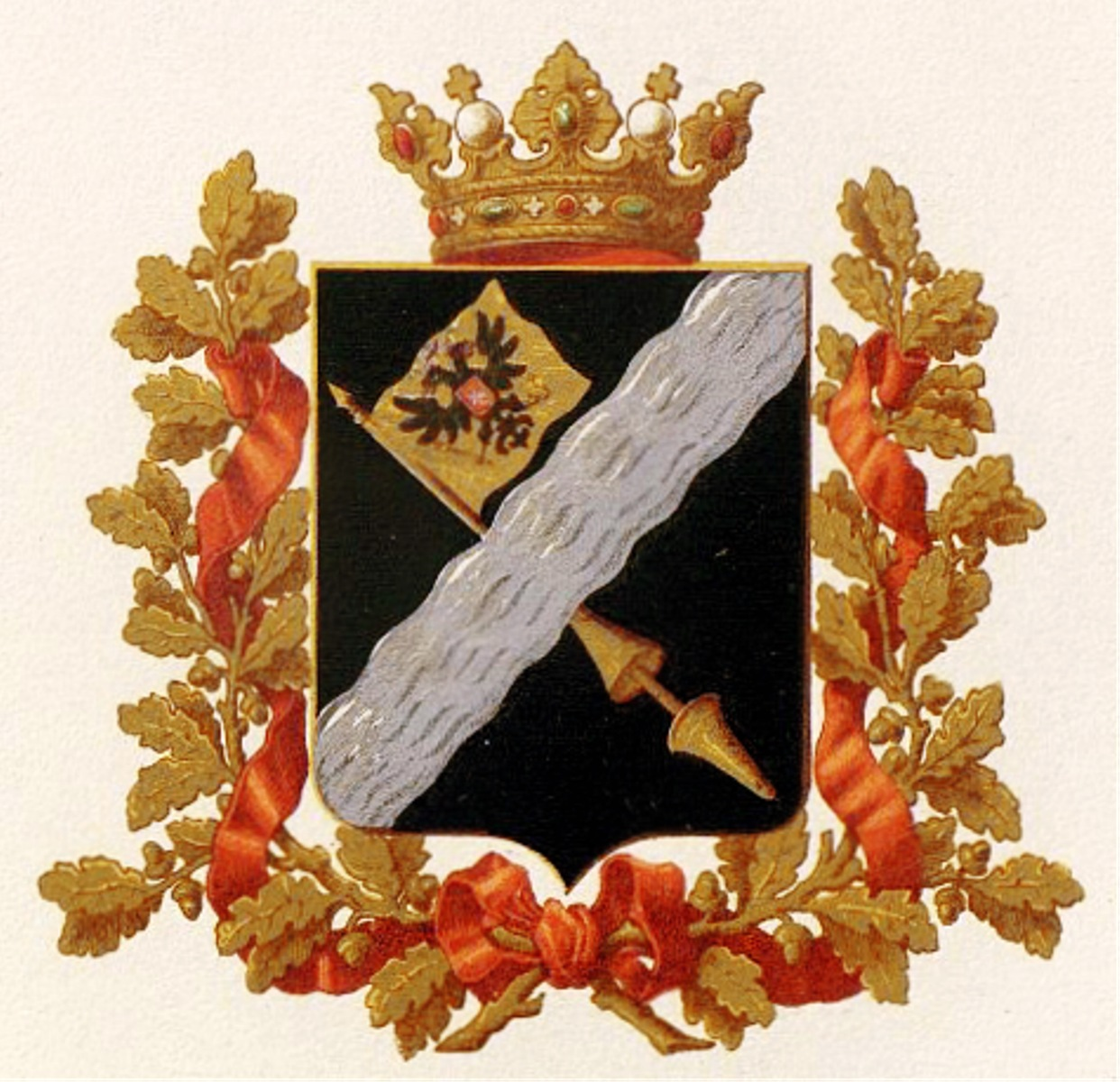
Coat of arms of the Terek Oblast (1860–1920), of which North Ossetia was formerly contained in.

Coat of arms of the North Ossetian ASSR (1940–1978)

The coat of arms of the North Ossetian ASSR (1978–1991)

== See also ==
- Flag of North Ossetia
- Coat of arms of South Ossetia
- Emblem of the North Ossetian Autonomous Soviet Socialist Republic
