= Flag of Ossetia =

Ossetia
- Proportion: 1∶2
- Adopted: 1990 (South Ossetia), 1991 (North Ossetia)
- Design: A tri-horizontal bar flag with the colors white, red, and yellow

The Flag of Ossetia is a tricolor flag, top to bottom white, red, and yellow, used by the Ossetian people in Ossetia, a region spanning both sides of the Caucasus Mountains.

The flag is used by two distinct political entities: The Republic of North Ossetia–Alania (a federal subject of Russia), and the self-declared Republic of South Ossetia – State of Alania.

South Ossetia has been under the control of the Russian Federation since the 2008 Russo-Georgian war and is mostly unrecognized by the international community.

== History ==
=== North Ossetia ===
Under the Soviet Union, the North Ossetian ASSR changed flags several times. The present flag was adopted on 2 October 1991 shortly before the collapse of the Soviet Union, and then reinstated on 24 November 1994.

Flag	Date	Use	Details
	1917–1922	Flag of the Mountainous Republic of the Northern Caucasus	
	1924–1936	Flag of the North Ossetian Autonomous Oblast	
	1937–1938	Flag of the North Ossetian ASSR	Russian written in Cyrillic and Ossetian written in Latin
	1938–1954	Flag of the North Ossetian ASSR	Russian and Ossetian both written in Cyrillic
	1954–1981	Flag of the North Ossetian ASSR	
	1981–1991	Flag of the North Ossetian ASSR	
	2 October – 10 December 1991	Flag of the North Ossetian ASSR, and then of the North Ossetian SSR	
	1991–1994	Flag of the North Ossetian SSR, and then of the Republic of North Ossetia-Alania	

=== South Ossetia ===
South Ossetian Autonomous Oblast

Between 1922 and 1990, South Ossetia was an autonomous oblast of the Georgian Soviet Socialist Republic known as the South Ossetian Autonomous Oblast. As an autonomous oblast, it did not have its own flag, instead the Flag of Georgian SSR was used for official purposes.

Republic of South Ossetia – State of Alania

The flag of the Republic of South Ossetia – State of Alania was prescribed by the South Ossetian Constitution of 26 November 1990 and confirmed by the Regulation on the National Flag of 30 March 1992. Unlike North Ossetia, South Ossetia did not use the variant with the violet stripe from 1991 to 1994, instead continuously using the variant with the red stripe.

The Republic of South Ossetia – State of Alania maintains a Presidential standard for use by the President of South Ossetia when serving in an official capacity as the head of state. Although the flag is often the coat of arms centered on the flag, there is no codified presidential standard, and as such several variants have been used.

Presidential standard of the Republic of South Ossetia – the State of Alania

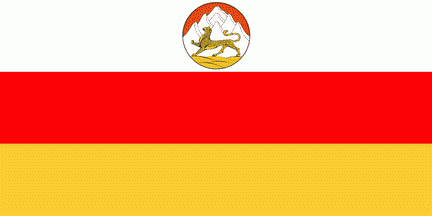
Variant presidential standard with coat of arms at top

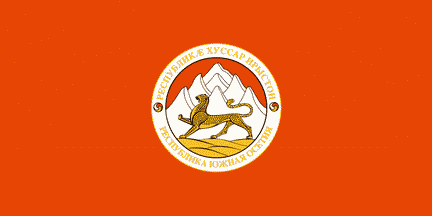
Variant presidential standard with coat of arms on orange field

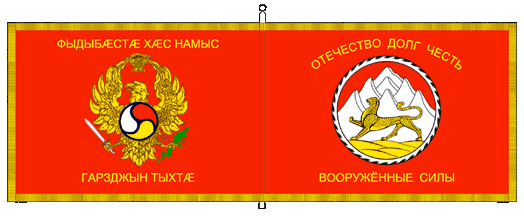
Flag of the Armed Forces of South Ossetia

Provisional Administration of South Ossetia (2007–2025)

The Provisional Administration of South Ossetia was established by the Government of Georgia in April 2007. It used the Ossetian flag together with the flag of Georgia. The provisional administration was abolished on 31 December 2025.

== Design ==
=== Symbolism ===
The flag is said to represent the social structure of ancient Ossetian society, which was divided into three social groups forming an organic whole: the military aristocracy, the clergy, and ordinary people. The colors symbolize moral purity (white), martial courage (red) and wealth and prosperity (yellow). In blazons, the flag is described as Per fess Argent and Or, a fess Gules. The proportions are 1:2.

=== Color scheme of the flag of North Ossetia ===
Colour model	White	Red	Yellow
Pantone	Safe	Red 186c	Yellow 012c
CMYK	0.0.0.0	0.100.83.24	0.16.100.1
RGB	(255,255,255)	(193,0,32)	(255,215,0)
Hexadecimal	#FFFFFF	#C10020	#FFD700
NCS	S 0300-N	S 1085-Y80R	S 0580-G70Y

== Gallery ==
Standard of the head of the Republic of North Ossetia-Alania

Flag of Ossetia as a vertical banner

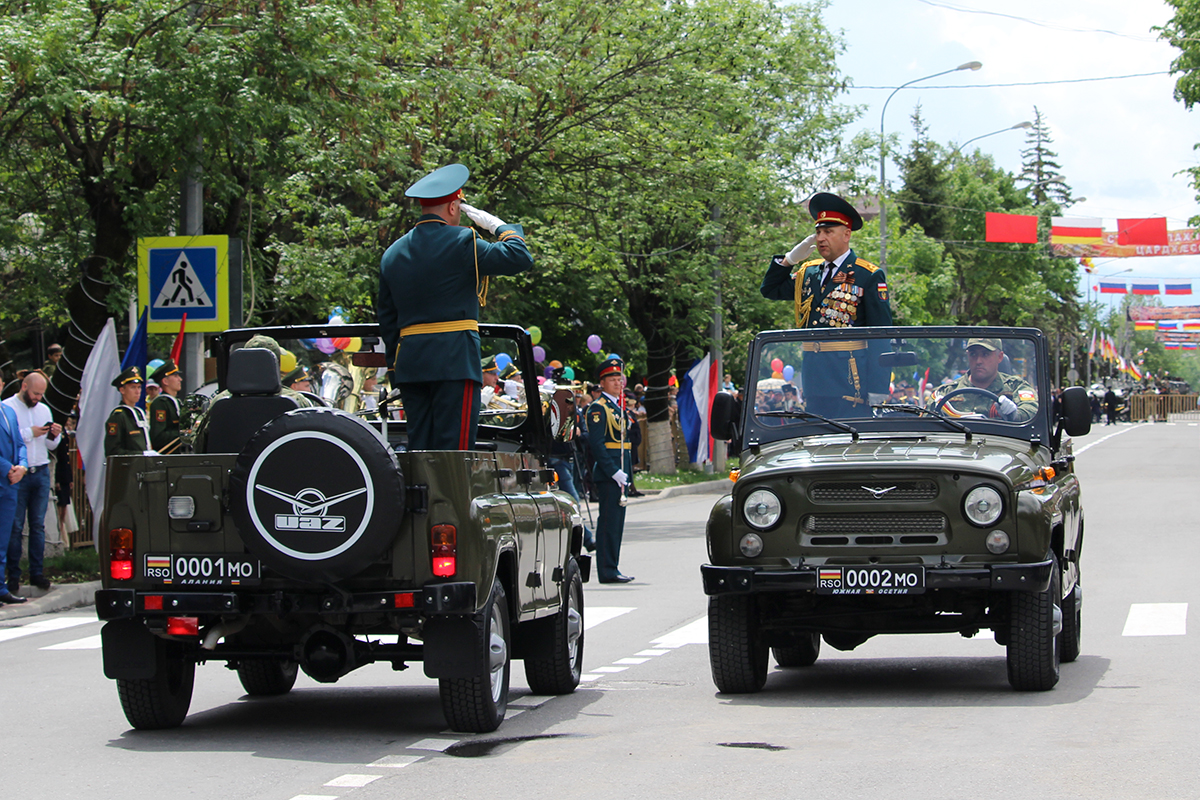
Military parade in South Ossetia: flags visible on licence plates and on bunting

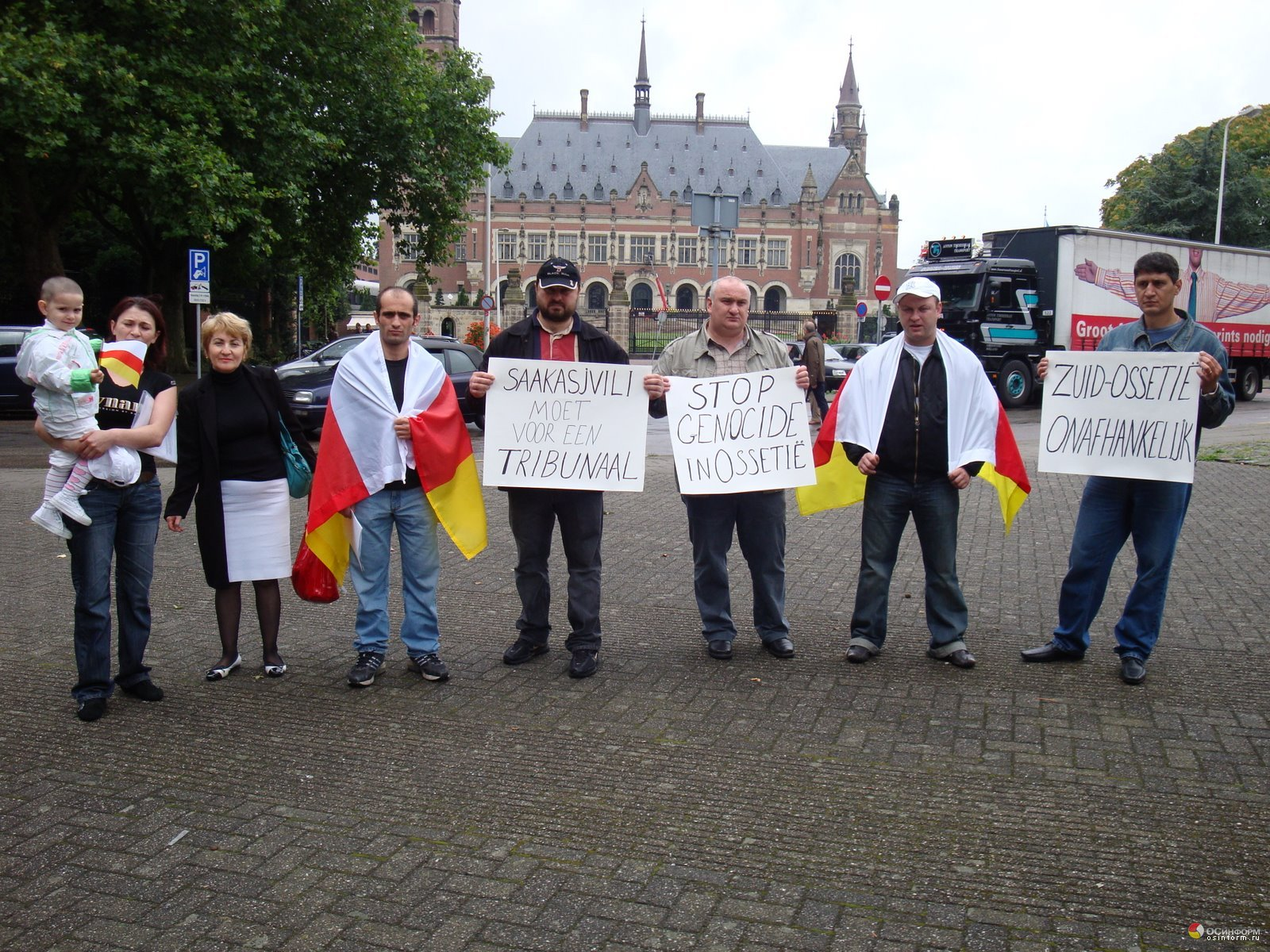
Protestors with Ossetian flags in front of the seat of the International Court of Justice in The Hague

== See also ==
- Coat of arms of North Ossetia
- Coat of arms of South Ossetia
- Flag of the North Ossetian Autonomous Soviet Socialist Republic
