= South Ossetian zarin =

Currency of South Ossetia

хуссарирыстойнаг зæрин (Iron Ossetic); южноосетинский зарин (Russian)
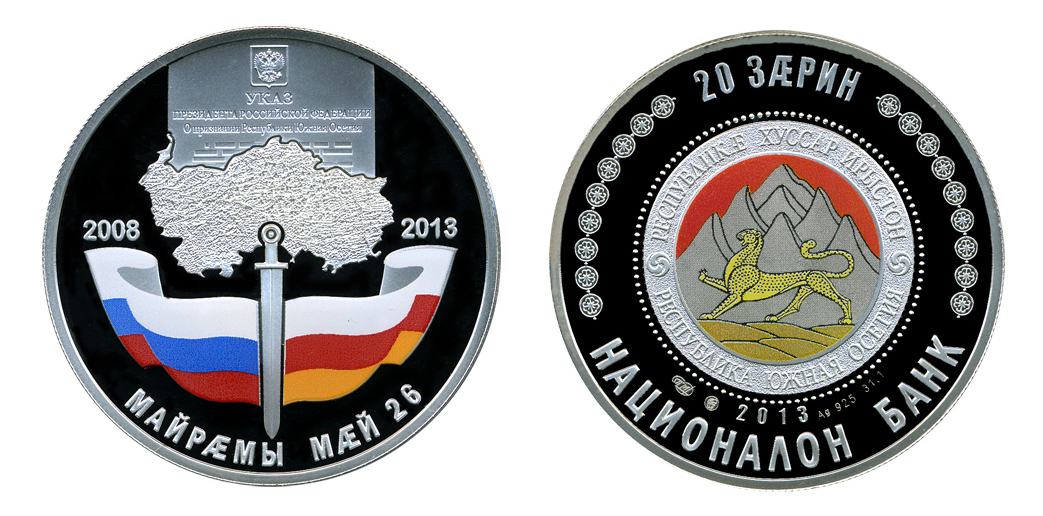
- A 20 zarin Coin issued in 2013 commemorating South Ossetian Independence

ISO 4217
- Code: none

Units of account
- Plural: zariny (зæрины)

Denominations
- Banknotes: 100 zarin
- Coins: 20, 25, 35, 50, 100 zarin

Demographics
- User(s): South Ossetia (alongside Russian ruble) Russia (Only in North Ossetia, alongside Russian ruble) Abkhazia (Uncommon, alongside Russian ruble and Abkhazian apsar)

Issuance
- Central bank: National Bank of the Republic of South Ossetia
- Mint: Moscow Mint
- Website: www.mmint.ru

Valuation
- Pegged with: 1 Z = ₽ 10

The zarin (Iron Ossetic: Зæрин) is one of the two official currencies of South Ossetia, alongside the Russian ruble. So far, coins in denominations of 20, 25, 35, 50, and 100 zarin have been issued along with a 100 zarin banknote in 2025. While the coins and banknotes are legal tender in the Republic of South Ossetia, their usage is limited, and they are mostly made for collectors. In South Ossetia, the Russian ruble is used in practice. The first zarin coins were introduced in 2013.

== Coin ==
The name derives from the Ossetian word for gold, сыгъзӕрин, syghzærin, shortened to зӕрин, zærin, from the Alanic *zærīñæ.

The National Bank of the Republic of South Ossetia is responsible for the zarin coins, and they have issued several series of coins, including one commemorating Red Army soldiers from the Great Patriotic War and another showing local Ossetian churches.

20, 25, 35 zarin coins are made of silver; and 50, 100 zarin coins are made of gold. The zarin is legal tender in Russia, South Ossetia and Abkhazia.

== History ==
On August 20, 2025, the National Bank of the Republic of South Ossetia announced the first run of 100 zarin banknotes commemorating South Ossetia's 35th anniversary on September 20. The bank also stated that South Ossetia would be presenting the 100 zarin banknote to The Maastricht Numismatic and Bonistic Exhibition, a governing body on Numismatics and Bonistics in The Netherlands and that further bills will be introduced at a later date.
