= Law enforcement in South Ossetia =

Law enforcement in South Ossetia is the responsibility of a variety of different agencies. The Ministry of Internal Affairs is the primary law enforcement agency in the republic.

== Interior Ministry and Police ==
On February 25, 1921, by decision of the South Ossetian District Party Committee, the South Ossetian Revolutionary Committee was formed. One of the main tasks of the South Ossetian Revolutionary Committee was to maintain order in South Ossetia.

=== Structure of the Ministry of Internal Affairs ===
- Criminal police
- Public Security Police
- Headquarters
- Investigative Department
- Human Resources Department
- Rear
- Department of Legal Support and International Cooperation
- Internal Security Directorate
- Department of office work, regime and work with appeals from citizens and organizations
- Department of Information and Public Relations
- City and district bodies of the Ministry of Internal Affairs of the Republic of South Ossetia

== Prosecutor's Office ==
The South Ossetian prosecutor's office was established on October 1, 1923, as part of the Central Executive Committee of the South Ossetian Autonomous Oblast. In 1929, some changes occurred in the organizational structure of the South Ossetian Prosecutor's Office, necessitated by the new administrative division. The Tskhinvali Inter-District Prosecutor's Office was established, and it existed under this name from 1929 to 1934. In 1965, the Tskhinvali Inter-District Prosecutor's Office was re-established. On January 14, 1992, the Supreme Council of the Republic of South Ossetia approved the structure of the republic's prosecutor's office by a Resolution. On September 5, 1995, the Investigative Department of the Prosecutor's Office was established. On July 15, 1996, an order was issued to separate the Tskhinvali United Prosecutor's Office and establish the Tskhinvali City Prosecutor's Office, which had been abolished the previous year. Today, the Prosecutor's Office comprises four district, city, and military prosecutor's offices, as well as a central office consisting of two directorates and five departments of the Prosecutor General's Office.

=== Structure ===
- Investigative Department
  - Department for the Investigation of Particularly Important Cases
  - Department for the Investigation of Corruption Crimes
- Office for International Legal Cooperation
- Department for Supervision of Crime Investigation, Operational Investigative Activities and the Execution of Criminal Punishments
- Department for Supervision of Compliance with Laws and Legality of Legal Acts
- Department for Ensuring the Participation of Prosecutors in Criminal, Civil and Arbitration Proceedings
- Department of Statistics, Performance Monitoring, Legal Support and Personnel
- Forensic Science Department
- Department of General and Special Office Work
- Department of planning, labor, financing, accounting, reporting, material support, building and transport operations

== KGB ==
The State Security Committee, abbreviated as KGB is the secret police agency of the partially recognized Republic of South Ossetia tasked with internal security, intelligence gathering, and similar functions to the Soviet Union's KGB.
