= South Ossetia =

Partially recognised state in the South Caucasus

- Republic of South Ossetia–the State of Alania
(in official languages)
Iron Ossetic	Республикӕ Хуссар Ирыстон Паддзахад Алани; Respublikæ Khussar Iryston Paddzakhad Alani
Russian	Республика Южная Осетия Государство Алания; Respublika Yuzhnaya Osetiya Gosudarstvo Alaniya
- Flag Coat of arms
- Anthem: Республикӕ Хуссар Ирыстоны Паддзахадон гимн Respublikæ Xussar Irystony Paddzaxadon gimn "State Anthem of the Republic of South Ossetia"
- South Ossetia in dark green, with Georgia in dark grey
- Status: State with limited recognition
- Capital and largest city: Tskhinvali; 42°13′30″N 43°58′12″E
- Official languages: Ossetian; Russian
- Ethnic groups (2015): 89.9% Ossetians; 7.4% Georgians; 1.1% Russians; 0.7% Armenians; 0.8% other
- Government: Unitary semi-presidential republic
  - President: Marat Kambolov
  - Prime Minister: Soslan Margiev
- Legislature: Parliament

Independence from Georgia
  - South Ossetian Autonomous Oblast: 20 April 1922
  - South Ossetian Soviet Democratic Republic: 20 September 1990
  - Republic of South Ossetia: 21 December 1991

Area
  - Total: 3,885 km^{2} (1,500 sq mi)
  - Water (%): negligible

Population
  - 2022 estimate: 56,520
  - 2015 census: 53,532 (212th)
  - Density: 13.7/km^{2} (35.5/sq mi)
- GDP (nominal): 2021 estimate
  - Total: $52 million
  - Per capita: $1,000
- Currency: South Ossetian Zarin (commemorative currency); Russian ruble; (RUB)
- Time zone: UTC+03:00 (MSK)
- Calling code: +7 929

South Ossetia, (Note: Pronounced /ɒˈsɛtiə/ o-SET-ee-ə, less commonly /ɒˈsiːʃə/ o-SEE-shə; Iron Ossetic: Хуссар Ирыстон, romanised: Xussar Iryston; Russian: Южная Осетия, romanised: Yuzhnaya Osetiya; Georgian: სამხრეთ ოსეთი, romanized: Samkhret Oseti.) formally the Republic of South Ossetia—the State of Alania since 2017, and originally the Republic of South Ossetia, is a partially recognised state in the South Caucasus. It has an officially stated population of just over 56,500 people (2022), who live in an area of 3,900 square kilometres (1,500 sq mi), with 33,000 living in the capital city, Tskhinvali. It de facto borders only Russia and Georgia.

As of 2026, four members of the United Nations (UN) recognise South Ossetia as a sovereign state – Russia, Venezuela, Nicaragua, and Syria. The Georgian government and all other UN member states regard South Ossetia as sovereign territory of Georgia. Georgia and the European Court of Human Rights (Note: See Georgia v. Russia (II) and Malachini and Others v. Russia) have ruled the region to be under the Russian occupation because of Russia's military, political and economic presence in South Ossetia.

The political status of South Ossetia is a central issue of the Georgian–Ossetian conflict and Georgia–Russia relations. The Georgian government informally refers to the area as the Tskhinvali region (Note: Georgian: ცხინვალის რეგიონი, romanized: tskhinvalis regioni; Russian: Цхинвальский регион, romanised: Tskhinvalskiy region) and considers it a part of Georgia's Imereti, Mtskheta-Mtianeti, Racha-Lechkhumi and Kvemo Svaneti and Shida Kartli regions. Georgia maintained local councils elected in 2006 in Akhalgori, Kurta, Tighva and Eredvi municipalities before they were captured by the separatists and Russia in 2008.

The South Ossetian Autonomous Oblast, established by Soviet authorities in Moscow in 1922, declared independence from the Georgian Soviet Socialist Republic in September 1990. Towards the end of 1990, the situation for ethnic Georgians in the region worsened sharply. There were multiple lootings and beatings committed both by Georgian and Ossetian armed forces and paramilitary units. The Georgian government responded by abolishing South Ossetia's autonomy and dispatching its troops to the region. The escalating crisis led to the 1991–1992 South Ossetia War with Russian involvement on the Ossetian side. After the war, the conflict remained frozen throughout the 1990s and saw two major escalations in the 2000s: in 2004 and in 2008. The latter conflict led to the full-scale Russo-Georgian War of August 2008, during which Ossetian and Russian forces gained full de facto control of the territory of the former South Ossetian Autonomous Oblast. Georgia and most other states consider South Ossetia to be under Russian military occupation.

South Ossetia relies heavily on military, political, and financial aid from Russia. Since 2008, the South Ossetian government has expressed its desire to join the Russian Federation; if this occurs, it would end South Ossetia's proclaimed independence. A referendum on this matter has been raised multiple times in domestic politics, but none has taken place.

== History ==
=== Medieval and early modern period ===
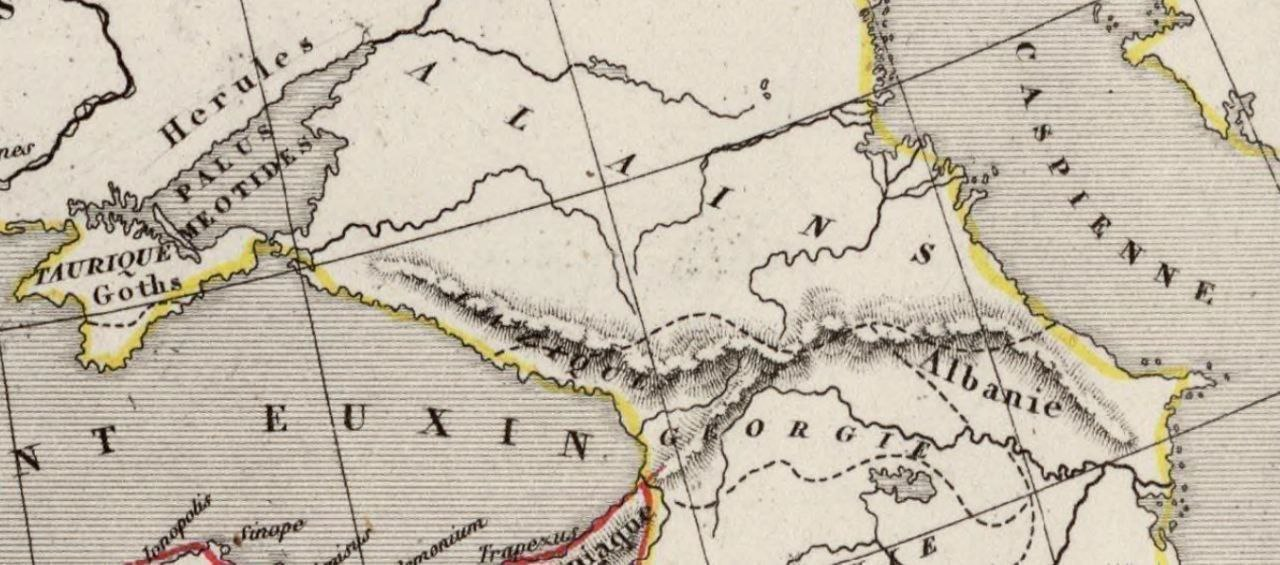
Map fragment of the Caucasus circa 4th century, the Alans occupy the Northern Caucasus and border Georgia along the Caucasus Mountains

The Ossetians are believed to originate from the Alans, a nomadic Iranian tribe. In the 8th century a consolidated Alan kingdom, referred to in sources of the period as Alania, emerged in the northern Caucasus Mountains. Around 1239–1277 Alania fell to the Mongol and later to Timur's armies, who massacred much of the Alanian population. The surviving Alans retreated into the mountains of the central Caucasus and gradually migrated south, across the Caucasus Mountains into the Kingdom of Georgia. (Note: Coene, p.151) The first large-scale conflict between the Ossetians and Georgians occurred in the 13th century. After the Mongol invasion, the Alans left vast lands in the North Caucasus and invaded Georgia. The Alans then took control of the territory from Gori to Mtskheta and territory of South Ossetia. But in 1306, after a 3-month siege of Gori, the Georgian ruler George V of Georgia managed to take Gori and the territory of South Ossetia under his control. At the same time, the Alans were expelled from Shida Kartli and Dvaleti. In the village of Zakagori, an inscription was found on a tombstone in the Ossetian language written in Syriac-Nestorian script, which dates back to 1326.

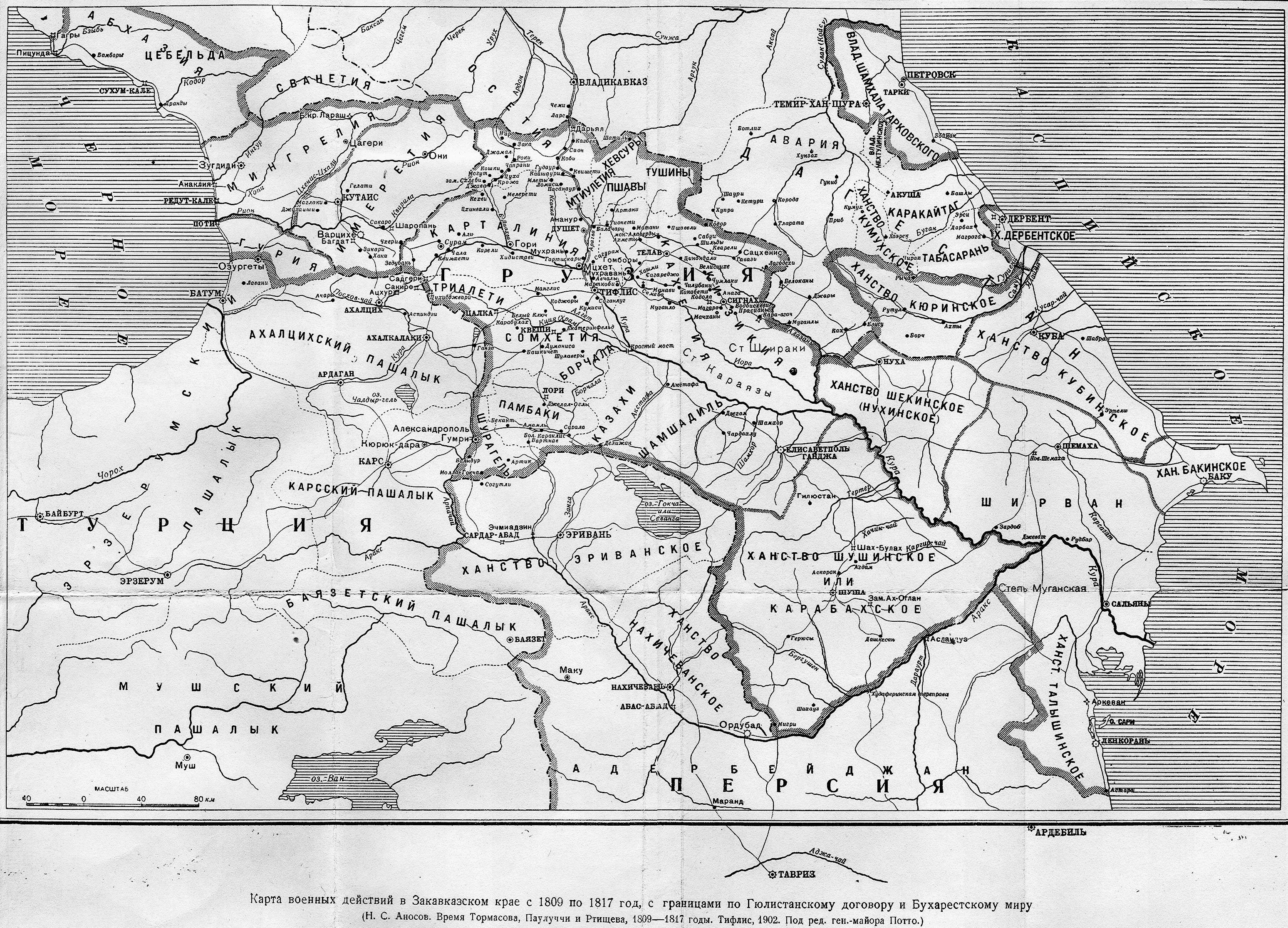
Historical Russian map of the Caucasus region at the beginning of the 19th century

In the 17th century, by pressure of Kabardian princes, Ossetians started a second wave of migration from the North Caucasus to the Kingdom of Kartli. Ossetian peasants, who were migrating to the mountainous areas of the South Caucasus, often settled in the lands of Georgian feudal lords. The Georgian King of the Kingdom of Kartli permitted Ossetians to immigrate. According to Russian ambassador to Georgia Mikhail Tatishchev, at the beginning of the 17th century there was already a small group of Ossetians living near the headwaters of the Great Liakhvi. The Georgian-Ossetian population of the Ksani took an active part in the Kakhetian Uprising (1659). In 1711, Vakhtang VI launched an armed expedition against the Ossetians in South Ossetia and Dvaleti. He destroyed 80 towers and forced the Ossetians of Dvaleti, North part of South Ossetia to submit to Kingdom of Kartli.

Ossetian migration over time according to Georgian historian Roland Topchishvili

This period has been documented in the travel diaries of Johann Anton Güldenstädt who visited Georgia in 1772. The Baltic German explorer called modern North Ossetia–Alania simply Ossetia, while he wrote that Kartli (the areas of modern-day South Ossetia) was populated by Georgians and the mountainous areas were populated by both Georgians and Ossetians. Güldenstädt also wrote that the northernmost border of Kartli is the Major Caucasus Ridge. By the end of the 18th century, the ultimate sites of Ossetian settlement on the territory of modern South Ossetia were in Kudaro (Jejora river estuary), Greater Liakhvi gorge, the gorge of Little Liakhvi, Ksani River gorge, Guda (Tetri Aragvi estuary) and Truso (Terek estuary).

The Georgian Kingdom of Kartli-Kakheti, including the territory of modern South Ossetia, was annexed by the Russian Empire in 1801. However, the Ossetians refused to submit to the new administration and considered themselves independent. In 1821-1830 the stage of annexation of South Ossetia began, which ended with the conquest of South Ossetia by Paul Rennenkampff in 1830. By 1830, Ossetia was completely under Russian control. Ossetian migration to Georgian areas continued in the 19th and 20th centuries, when Georgia was part of the Russian Empire and Ossetian settlements emerged in Trialeti, Borjomi, Bakuriani and Kakheti as well.

=== South Ossetia as a part of the Soviet Union ===
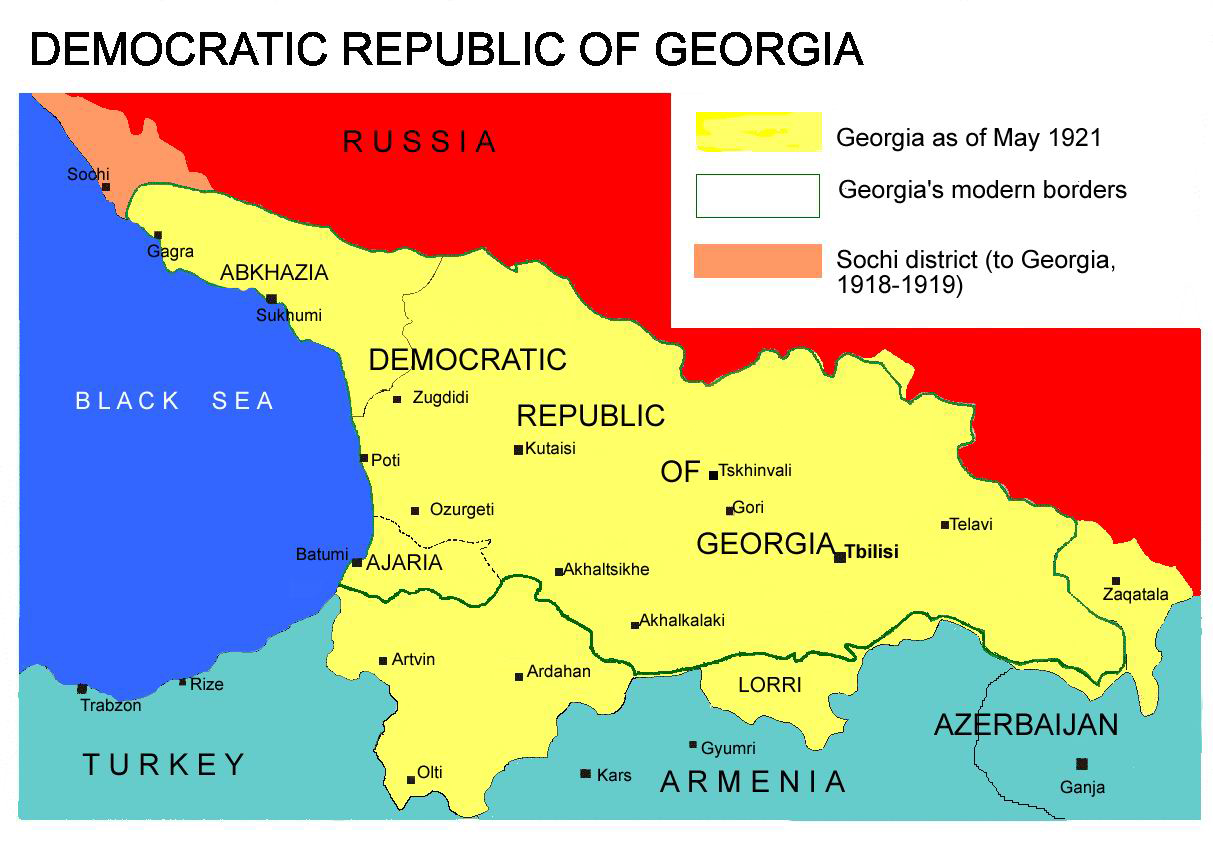
Democratic Republic of Georgia (1918–1921) in 1921

Following the Russian revolution, the area of modern South Ossetia became part of the Democratic Republic of Georgia. In 1918, conflict began between the landless Ossetian peasants living in Shida Kartli (Interior Georgia), who were influenced by Bolshevism and demanded ownership of the lands they worked, and the Menshevik government backed ethnic Georgian aristocrats, who were legal owners. Although the Ossetians were initially discontented with the economic policies of the central government, the tension soon transformed into ethnic conflict. The first Ossetian rebellion began in February 1918, when three Georgian princes were killed and their land was seized by the Ossetians. The central government of Tiflis retaliated by sending the National Guard to the area. However, the Georgian unit retreated after they had engaged the Ossetians. Ossetian rebels then proceeded to occupy the town of Tskhinvali and began attacking the ethnic Georgian civilian population. During uprisings in 1919 and 1920, the Ossetians were covertly supported by Soviet Russia, but even so, were defeated. According to allegations made by Ossetian sources, the crushing of the 1920 uprising caused the death of 5,000 Ossetians, while ensuing hunger and epidemics were the causes of death of more than 13,000 people. (Note: ICG, "Georgia: Avoiding War in South Ossetia", p. 3)

Creation of South Ossetian AO on historical Georgian regions in 1922

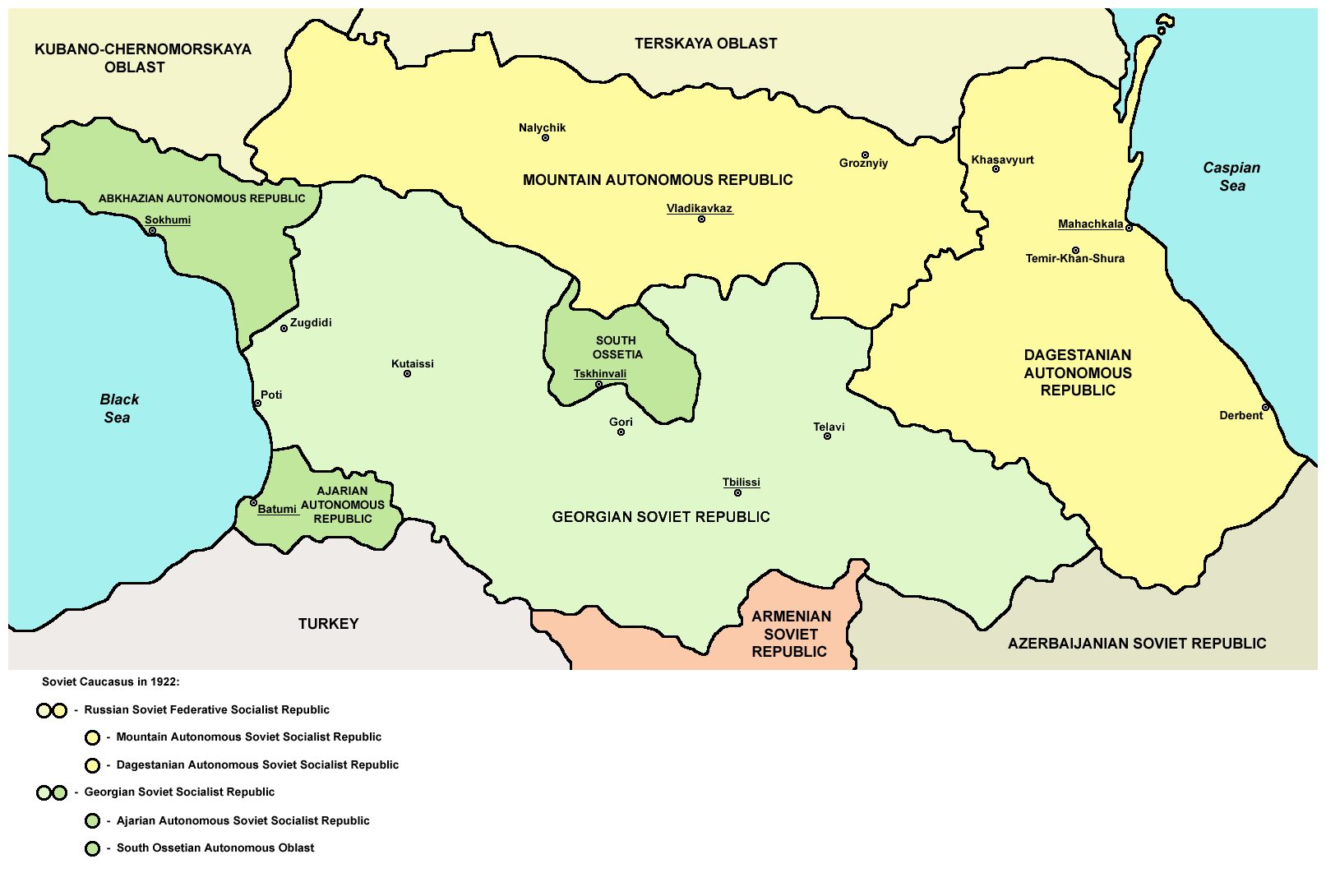
Map of the South Ossetian Autonomous Oblast in 1922

Early Coat of Arms of South Ossetia

The Soviet Georgian government, established after the Red Army invasion of Georgia in 1921, created an autonomous administrative unit for Transcaucasian Ossetians in April 1922 under pressure from Kavbiuro (the Caucasian Bureau of the Central Committee of the Communist Party of the Soviet Union), called the South Ossetian Autonomous Oblast (AO). Some believe that the Bolsheviks granted this autonomy to the Ossetians in exchange for their (Bolshevik) loyalty in fighting the Democratic Republic of Georgia and favouring local separatists, since this area had never been a separate entity prior to the Russian invasion. (Note: De Waal et al, Beyond Frozen Conflict, chapter 6. South Ossetia Today) The drawing of administrative boundaries of the South Ossetian AO was quite a complicated process. Many Georgian villages were included within the South Ossetian AO despite numerous protests by the Georgian population. While the city of Tskhinvali did not have a majority Ossetian population, it was made the capital of the South Ossetian AO. In addition to parts of Gori uezd and Dusheti uezd of Tiflis Governorate, parts of Racha uezd of Kutaisi Governorate (western Georgia) were also included within the South Ossetian AO. All these territories historically had been indigenous Georgian lands.

Historical Ossetia in the North Caucasus did not have its own political entity before 1924, when the North Ossetian Autonomous Oblast was created.

Although the Ossetians had their own language (Ossetian), Russian and Georgian were administrative/state languages. Under the rule of Georgia's government during Soviet times, Ossetians enjoyed minority cultural autonomy, including speaking the Ossetian language and teaching it in schools. In 1989, two-thirds of Ossetians in the Georgian Soviet Socialist Republic lived outside the South Ossetian AO.

=== Georgian-Ossetian conflict ===
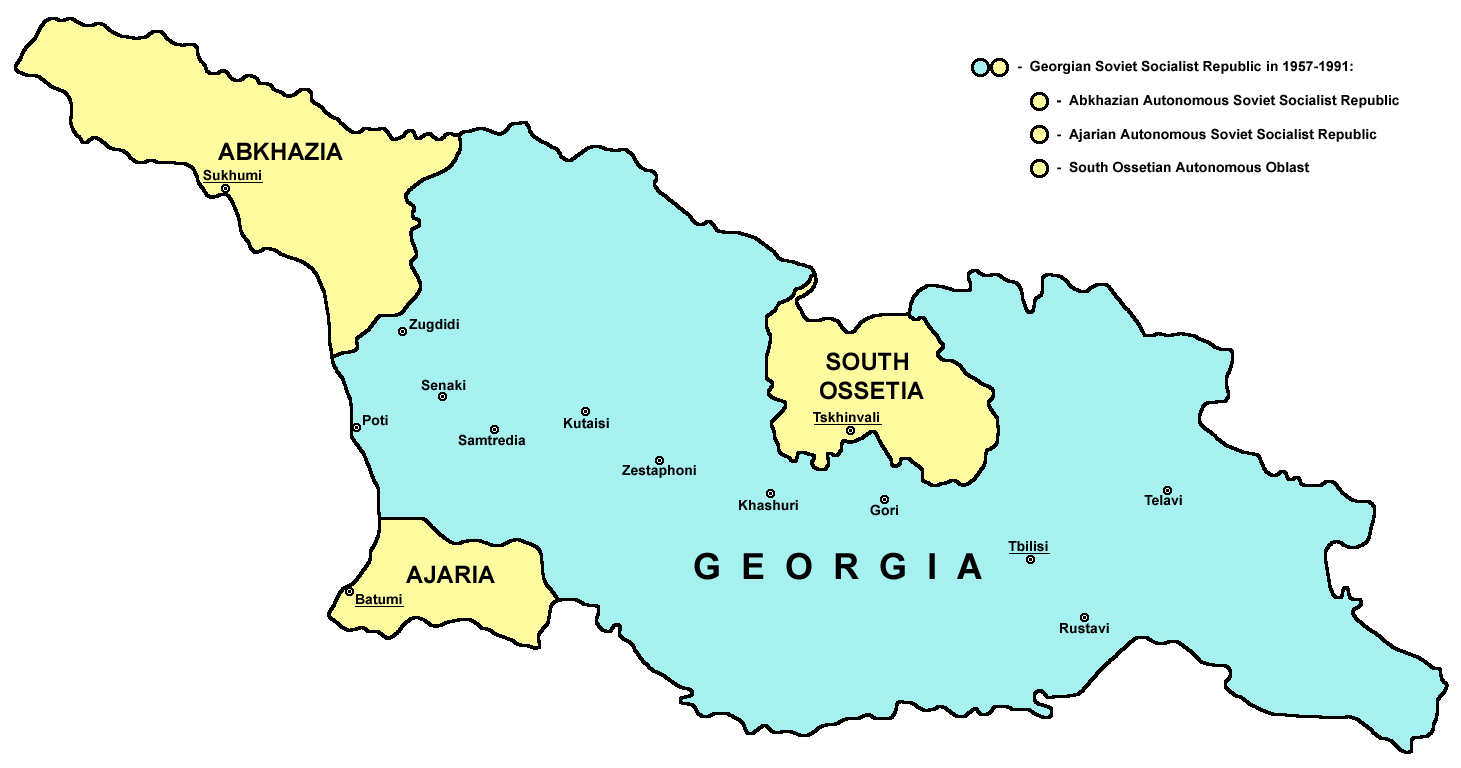
Map of the Georgian Soviet Socialist Republic in 1957–1991

==== 1989–2008 ====
Tensions in the region began to rise amid rising nationalism among both Georgians and Ossetians in 1989. Before this, the two communities of the South Ossetian Autonomous Oblast of the Georgian SSR had been living in peace with each other except for the 1918–1920 events. Both ethnicities had a normal degree of interaction and there were many Georgian-Ossetian intermarriages. (Note: De Waal, "Beyond Frozen Conflict", 2.3.4 South Ossetia scenarios, page 44-45; 6.2 background, page 190; 6.6 Links with Georgia, page 201.)

The dispute over the presence of the Ossetian people in the South Caucasus was one of the causes of the conflict. Although Georgian historiography believes that the mass migration of Ossetians to the South Caucasus (Georgia) began in the 17th century, Ossetian historians claim that Ossetians have lived in Georgia since ancient times. Some Ossetian historians accept that the migration of Ossetian ancestors to modern South Ossetia began after the Mongol invasions of the 13th century, while one South Ossetian de facto foreign minister in the 1990s said that the Ossetians first appeared in the area only in the early 17th century. Since it was created after the Russian invasion of 1921, South Ossetia was regarded as an artificial creation by Georgians during the Soviet era.

The South Ossetian Popular Front (Ademon Nykhas) was created in 1988. On 10 November 1989, the South Ossetian regional council asked the Georgian Supreme Council to upgrade the region to the status of an "autonomous republic". The decision to transform the South Ossetian AO into the South Ossetian ASSR by the South Ossetian authorities escalated the conflict. On 11 November, this decision was revoked by the Georgian parliament, the Supreme Soviet. The Georgian authorities removed the First Party Secretary of the oblast from his position.

The Georgian Supreme Council adopted a law barring regional parties in summer 1990. The South Ossetian regional council interpreted this as a move against Ademon Nykhas and subsequently passed a "declaration of national sovereignty", proclaiming the South Ossetian Soviet Democratic Republic within the Soviet Union on 20 September 1990. Ossetians boycotted subsequent Georgian parliamentary elections and held their own contest in December.

In October 1990, the parliamentary election in Georgia was won by Zviad Gamsakhurdia's "Round Table" block. On 11 December 1990, Zviad Gamsakhurdia's government declared the Ossetian election illegitimate and abolished South Ossetia's autonomous status altogether. Gamsakhurdia rationalised the abolition of Ossetian autonomy by saying, "They [Ossetians] have no right to a state here in Georgia. They are a national minority. Their homeland is North Ossetia .... Here they are newcomers."

When the Georgian parliament declared a state of emergency in the territory of South Ossetian AO on 12 December 1990, troops from both Georgian and Soviet interior ministries were sent to the region. After the Georgian National Guard was formed in early 1991, Georgian troops entered Tskhinvali on 5 January 1991. The 1991–1992 South Ossetia War was characterised by general disregard for international humanitarian law by uncontrollable militias, with both sides reporting atrocities. The Soviet military facilitated a ceasefire as ordered by Mikhail Gorbachev in January 1991. In March and April 1991, Soviet interior troops were reported actively disarming militias on both sides, and deterring the inter-ethnic violence. Zviad Gamsakhurdia asserted that the Soviet leadership was encouraging South Ossetian separatism in order to force Georgia not to leave the Soviet Union. Georgia declared its independence in April 1991.

As a result of the war, about 100,000 ethnic Ossetians fled the territory and Georgia proper, most across the border into North Ossetia. A further 23,000 ethnic Georgians fled South Ossetia to other parts of Georgia. Between 60 and 100 villages were burned down, destroyed by Georgian forces or otherwise abandoned. Several villages were ethnically cleansed by Georgian forces. On the other side, Georgians living in Ossetian-controlled territory were "easy targets"; houses occupied by Georgians were singled out, looted and burned down.

On 29 April 1991 western part of South Ossetia was affected by an earthquake, which killed more than 200 and left tens of thousands homeless.

In late 1991, dissent was mounting against Gamsakhurdia in Georgia due to his intolerance of critics and attempts to concentrate political power. On 22 December 1991, after a coup d'état, Gamsakhurdia and his supporters were besieged by the opposition, which was backed by the national guard, in several government buildings in Tbilisi. The ensuing heavy fighting resulted in over 200 casualties and left the centre of the Georgian capital in ruins. On 6 January, Gamsakhurdia and several of his supporters fled the city for exile. Afterwards, the Georgian military council, an interim government, was formed by a triumvirate of Jaba Ioseliani, Tengiz Kitovani and Tengiz Sigua, and, in March 1992, they invited Eduard Shevardnadze, a former Soviet minister, to come to Georgia to assume control of the Georgian State Council. (Note: Jones (2013), Chapter 4 Interregnum, p. 75. "On March 7th, 1992, the 64-year-old pensioner Eduard Shevardnadze flew into Tbilisi." and "He was invited by the triumphant but politically inexperienced rebels – Ioselani, Kitovani, and Tengiz Sigua – to reestablish order and keep them safe".)

An independence referendum was held in South Ossetia on 19 January 1992, with voters being asked two questions: "Do you agree that South Ossetia should be an independent country?" and "Do you agree with the South Ossetian parliament's solution of 1 September 1991 on reunion with Russia?" Both proposals were approved, but the results were not recognised internationally. Nonetheless, the South Ossetian regional council subsequently passed an "act of state independence" and declared the independence of the Republic of South Ossetia on 29 May 1992.

Georgian Civil War from October to December 1993

On 24 June 1992, Shevardnadze and the South Ossetian government signed the Sochi ceasefire agreement, brokered by Russia. The agreement included obligations to avoid the use of force, and Georgia pledged not to impose sanctions against South Ossetia. The Georgian government retained control over substantial portions of South Ossetia, including the town of Akhalgori. (Note: ICG "Georgia’s South Ossetia Conflict: Make Haste Slowly", I. Introduction: "The leadership of the former oblast retained control over the districts of Tskhinvali, Java, Znauri and parts of Akhalgori. The Tbilisi central government had authority over the rest of Akhalgori and the Georgian villages in the Tskhinvali district.") A Joined Peacekeeping force of Ossetians, Russians and Georgians was established. On 6 November 1992, the Organization for Security and Co-operation in Europe (OSCE) set up a mission in Georgia to monitor the peacekeeping operation. From then until mid-2004, South Ossetia was generally peaceful. (Note: De Waal et al, Beyond Frozen Conflict, chapter 6. South Ossetia Today, page 192: "From 1992 to 2004, de facto, South Ossetia remained part of the Georgian economy and the conflict resembled that over Transdniestria, being much more a non-violent political dispute than a toxic conflict.") (Note: ICG, "Georgia: Avoiding War in South Ossetia", page 13 "The antismuggling operation [in 2004] had a direct effect on the security environment, as the Georgian checkpoints and increasing numbers of armed men in the zone shattered the peaceful environment and co-existence.")

Following the 2003 Rose Revolution, Mikheil Saakashvili became the President of Georgia in 2004. Ahead of the 2004 parliamentary and presidential elections, he promised to restore the territorial integrity of Georgia. During one of his early speeches, Saakashvili addressed the separatist regions, saying, "[N]either Georgia nor its president will put up with disintegration of Georgia. Therefore, we offer immediate negotiations to our Abkhazian and Ossetian friends. We are ready to discuss every model of statehood by taking into consideration their interests for the promotion of their future development."

Since 2004, tensions began to rise as the Georgian authorities strengthened their efforts to bring the region back under their rule, after it succeeded in Adjara. Georgia sent police to close down the Ergneti black market, which was one of the region's chief sources of revenue, selling foodstuffs and fuel smuggled from Russia. The Georgian authorities claimed the massive smuggling of goods for the Ergneti market through the Roki Tunnel, which was not under Georgian control, cost the country significant amounts of customs revenues. (Note: ICG, "Georgia: Avoiding War in South Ossetia", page 10: "Georgia lost significant customs revenue due to smuggling; some calculated as much as 80 per cent. Estimates of the value vary widely from 5 to 20 million lari ($2.5 to $10 million) monthly. While some analysts consider that "the greatest part of the smuggled goods entering Georgia came from South Ossetia".) Georgia proposed to bring the Roki tunnel under joint control and monitoring, which was refused by the South Ossetian side. The antismuggling operation against the market resulted in a breakdown of South Ossetian trust in Georgia's intentions. (Note: ICG, "Georgia: Avoiding War in South Ossetia", page 13: "Humanitarian aid from Tbilisi was received with deep suspicion. EU Special Envoy Heikki Talvitie noted 'they [authorities in South Ossetia] are very much afraid. They do not have much trust towards the Georgian aid' and "By mid-June relations between ethnic Georgians and Ossetians living in villages on the outskirts of Tskhinvali had reached a low point. The antismuggling operation had a direct effect on the security environment, as the Georgian checkpoints and increasing numbers of armed men in the zone shattered the peaceful environment and co-existence".) A wave of violence erupted between Georgian peacekeepers and South Ossetian militiamen and freelance fighters from Russia. This included hostage-taking of dozens of Georgian peacekeepers, shootouts and shelling of Georgian-controlled villages, which left dozens dead and wounded. A ceasefire deal was reached on 13 August, though it was repeatedly violated. (Note: ICG, "Georgia: Avoiding War in South Ossetia", page 14.")

The Georgian government protested against the allegedly increasing Russian economic and political presence in the region and against the uncontrolled military of the South Ossetian side. (Note: Georgian Foreign Ministry, 22 September 2005: "The Georgian side has stated numerous times that the presence of uncontrolled militias is the main reason for provocations in the conflict zone and it is necessary to strengthen international control in this direction.") Georgian government officials have stated South Ossetian key security positions are occupied by (former) Russian security officials, (Note: Georgian Foreign Ministry, 22 Sep 2005: "According to the Georgian authorities, most of the key security positions in the South Ossetian administration are occupied by ex- or current Russian officials".) while some political researchers speak of institutions being outsourced to the Russian Federation. (Note: "The local ‘security’ institutions in Abkhazia, South Ossetia and Transnistria are often headed by Russians or officials who are de facto delegated by state institutions of the Russian Federation. This most often includes staff in the local intelligence services and the defence ministries. Examples of Russians de facto delegated to the secessionist entities include defence ministers Anatoli Barankevich (South Ossetia) and Sultan Sosnaliev (Abkhazia), local intelligence chief Iarovoi (South Ossetia) and Interior Minister Mikhail Mindzaev (South Ossetia).")

It also considered the peacekeeping force (consisting in equal parts of South Ossetians, North Ossetians, Russians and Georgians) to be non-neutral and demanded its replacement. Various proposals were launched by the Georgian side to internationalise the peacekeeping in South Ossetia. According to US senator Richard Lugar, the US supported Georgia's call in 2006 for the withdrawal of Russian "peacekeepers" from the conflict zones. Later, EU South Caucasus envoy Peter Semneby said that "Russia's actions in the Georgia spy row have damaged its credibility as a neutral peacekeeper in the EU's Black Sea neighbourhood." Joe Biden (Chairman, US Senate Foreign Relations Committee), Richard Lugar, and Mel Martínez sponsored a resolution in June 2008 accusing Russia of attempting to undermine Georgia's territorial integrity and called for replacing the Russian-comprised peacekeeping force operating under CIS mandate.

==== 2008 war ====
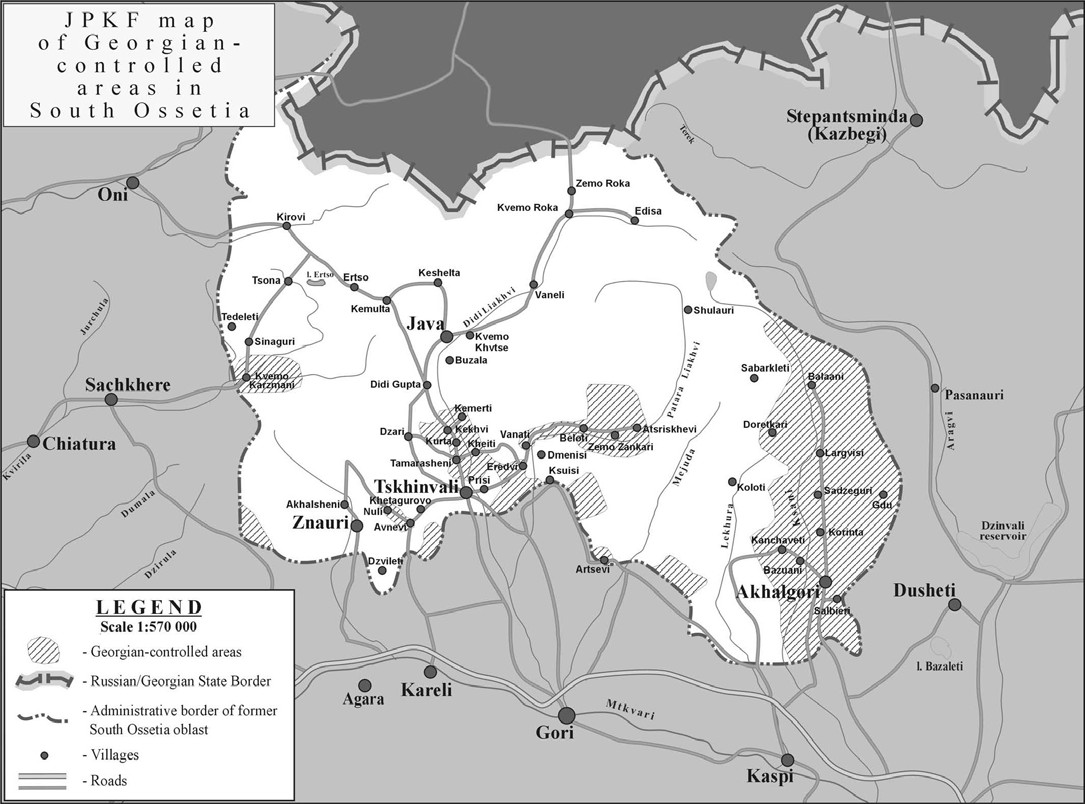
South Ossetia before the war

Tensions between Georgia and Russia began escalating in April 2008. A bomb explosion on 1 August 2008 targeted a car transporting Georgian peacekeepers. South Ossetians were responsible for instigating this incident, which marked the opening of hostilities and injured five Georgian servicemen. In response, several South Ossetian militiamen were hit. South Ossetian separatists began shelling Georgian villages on 1 August. These artillery attacks caused Georgian servicemen to return fire periodically from 1 August.

At around 19:00 on 7 August 2008, Georgian president Mikheil Saakashvili announced a unilateral ceasefire and called for peace talks. However, escalating assaults against Georgian villages (located in the South Ossetian conflict zone) were soon matched with gunfire from Georgian troops, who then proceeded to move in the direction of the capital of the self-proclaimed Republic of South Ossetia (Tskhinvali) on the night of 8 August, reaching its centre in the morning of 8 August. One Georgian diplomat told Russian newspaper Kommersant on 8 August that by taking control of Tskhinvali, Tbilisi wanted to demonstrate that Georgia would not tolerate the killing of Georgian citizens. According to Russian military expert Pavel Felgenhauer, the Ossetian provocation was aimed at triggering the Georgian response, which was needed as a pretext for premeditated Russian military invasion. According to Georgian intelligence, and several Russian media reports, parts of the regular (non-peacekeeping) Russian Army had already moved to South Ossetian territory through the Roki Tunnel before the Georgian military action.

Russia accused Georgia of "aggression against South Ossetia", and launched a large-scale land, air, and sea invasion of Georgia with the pretext of a "peace enforcement operation" on 8 August 2008. Russian airstrikes against targets within Georgia were also launched. Abkhaz forces opened a second front on 9 August by attacking the Kodori Gorge, held by Georgia. Tskhinvali was seized by the Russian military by 10 August. Russian forces occupied the Georgian cities of Zugdidi, Senaki, Poti, and Gori (the last one after the ceasefire agreement was negotiated). The Russian Black Sea Fleet blockaded the Georgian coast.

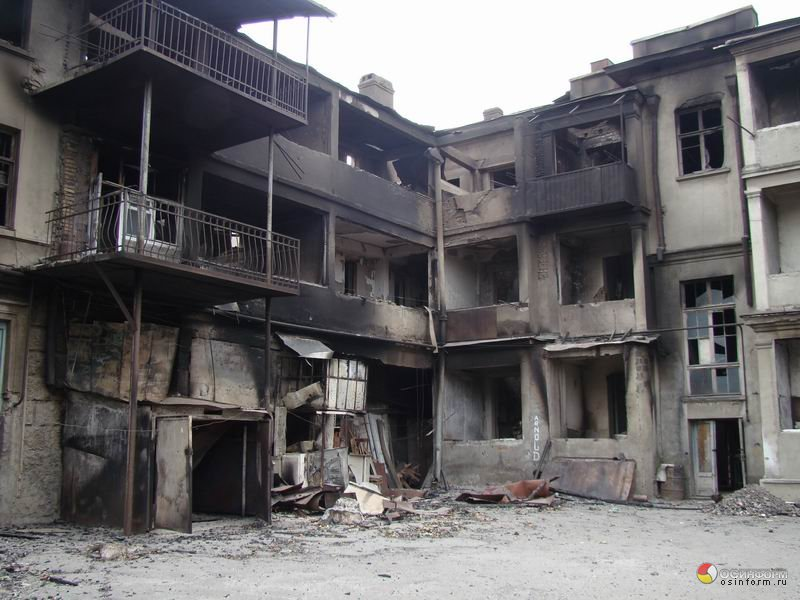
Tskhinvali in August 2008

A campaign of ethnic cleansing against Georgians in South Ossetia was conducted by South Ossetians, with Georgian villages around Tskhinvali being destroyed after the war had ended. The war displaced 192,000 people, and while many were able to return to their homes after the war, a year later around 30,000 ethnic Georgians remained displaced. In an interview published in Kommersant, a Russian daily newspaper, South Ossetian leader Eduard Kokoity said he would not allow Georgians to return.

President of France Nicolas Sarkozy negotiated a ceasefire agreement on 12 August 2008. On 17 August, Russian president Dmitry Medvedev announced that Russian forces would begin to pull out of Georgia the following day. Russia recognised Abkhazia and South Ossetia as separate republics on 26 August. In response to Russia's recognition, the Georgian government severed diplomatic relations with Russia. Russian forces left the buffer areas bordering Abkhazia and South Ossetia on 8 October and the European Union Monitoring Mission in Georgia assumed authority over the buffer areas. Since the war, Georgia has maintained that Abkhazia and South Ossetia are Russian-occupied Georgian territories.

On 30 September 2009, the European Union–sponsored Independent International Fact-Finding Mission on the Conflict in Georgia stated that, while preceded by months of mutual provocations, "open hostilities began with a large-scale Georgian military operation against the town of Tskhinvali and the surrounding areas, launched in the night of 7 to 8 August 2008."

=== After the 2008 war ===
In 2016, a referendum on integration with Russia was proposed during an election campaign, but was put on hold indefinitely. A referendum on South Ossetia's official name was held on 9 April 2017; over three-quarters of those who voted supported amendments to the South Ossetian constitution which gave the names "Republic of South Ossetia" and "State of Alania" equal status under the law.

South Ossetia was rocked by its most significant protests from 2020 to 2021 following the Murder of Inal Djabiev. Djabiev, a vocal member of the South Ossetian opposition to Anatoly Bibilov had been tortured to death by South Ossetian police resulting in months of protests and sacking of several government ministers.

President Anatoly Bibilov announced on 26 March 2022 that South Ossetian troops had been sent to assist Russia in its invasion of Ukraine. Bibilov announced on 30 March 2022 that South Ossetia would initiate the legal process to become part of Russia. Russian politicians reacted positively and said Russian law would permit (parts of) foreign nations to join the federation. They highlighted the necessity to "express the will of the Ossetian people" through a referendum. Ossetian leader Bibilov said in a lengthy interview that he planned to hold two referendums, one on annexation by Russia, and the second vote on joining North Ossetia, for which he set the election proceedings in motion on 7 April 2022. On 13 May, the annexation referendum was scheduled to take place on 17 July.

Following Biblov's defeat in the 2022 election, the new president, Alan Gagloev, suspended the referendum on 30 May. Gagloyev announced in August 2022 that border crossings with Georgia would be open ten days a month.

== Geography ==
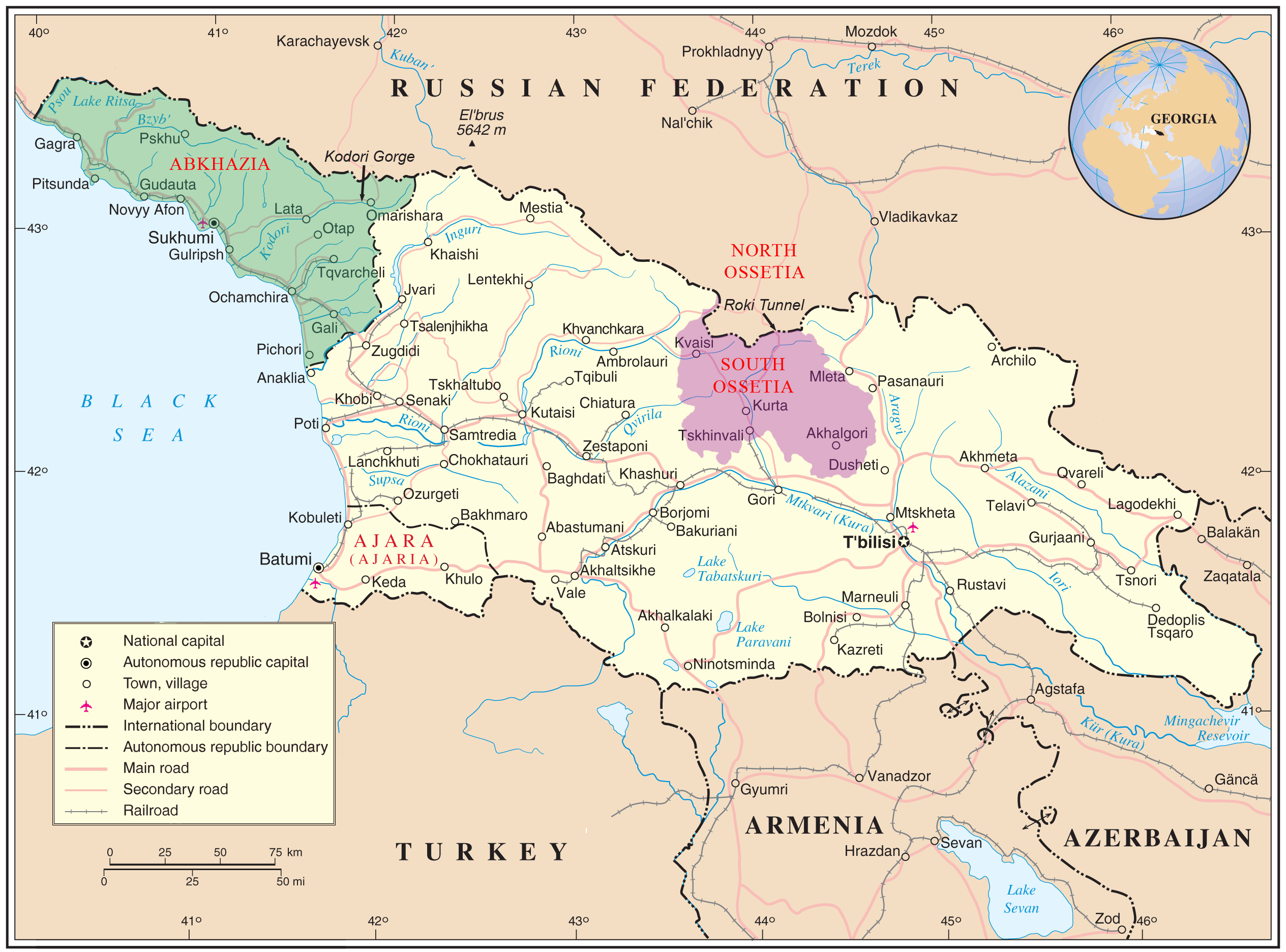
Map of Georgia highlighting South Ossetia (purple) and Abkhazia (green)

South Ossetia is a very mountainous region located in the Caucasus at the juncture of Asia and Europe. It occupies the southern slopes of the Greater Caucasus mountain range and its foothills which are part of the Iberia Plain, a geographic plateau that is roughly in the centre of South Ossetia. (Note: Geomorphology of Georgia, Chapter 12 "Eastern Georgia (Iveria) Intermountain Plain", page 206 "According to the orographic and morphogenetic features, the Iveria Plain is divided into several regions as follows: (1) the Shida Kartli Plain, (2) the Kvemo Kartli Plain, (3) the Iori Upland, (4) the Gombori Range, and (5) the Alazani Plain"; 12.2.2 Foothill Mountainous-Hilly Relief (of the Shida Kartli Plain), page 208) The Likhi Range shapes the western geographic boundary of South Ossetia, although the northwestern corner of South Ossetia is located west of the range.

The Greater Caucasus Mountain Range forms the northern border of South Ossetia with Russia. There is only one main road through the mountain range from South Ossetia to Russia, the TransKAM highway through the Roki tunnel into North Ossetia, which was completed in 1986. The Transkam section located in South Ossetia is nominally part of the Georgian S10 highway even though Tbilisi effectively does not control that part. The Roki Tunnel was vital for the Russian military in the 2008 South Ossetia war because it is the only direct route through the Caucasus Mountains between Russia and South Ossetia. (Note: ICG, "South Ossetia: The Burden of Recognition", page 4, footnote 29.)

South Ossetia covers an area of about 3,900 km^{2} (1,506 sq mi), (Note: South Ossetia Statistical digest for January–December 2021, page 7) separated by the mountains from the more populous North Ossetia (which is a republic within Russia) and extending southwards almost to the Mtkvari river in Georgia. More than 89% of South Ossetia lies over 1,000 m (3,281 ft) above sea level, and its highest point is Mount Khalatsa at 3,938 m (12,920 ft) above sea level.

Of the roughly 2,000 glaciers that exist in the Greater Caucasus, approximately 30% are located within Georgia. The 10 glaciers of the Liakhvi River basin and a handful of the Rioni River basin are located in South Ossetia. (Note: By 2014 the number of glaciers in the Greater Caucasus was established at 2,020, of which 637 are in Georgia (31.5%).)

Most of South Ossetia is in the Kura Basin with the northwestern part of it in the Black Sea basin. The Likhi and Racha ridges act as divide separating these two basins. Major rivers in South Ossetia include the Greater and Little Liakhvi, Ksani, Medzhuda, Tlidon, Canal Saltanis, Ptsa River and a host of other tributaries.

=== Climate ===
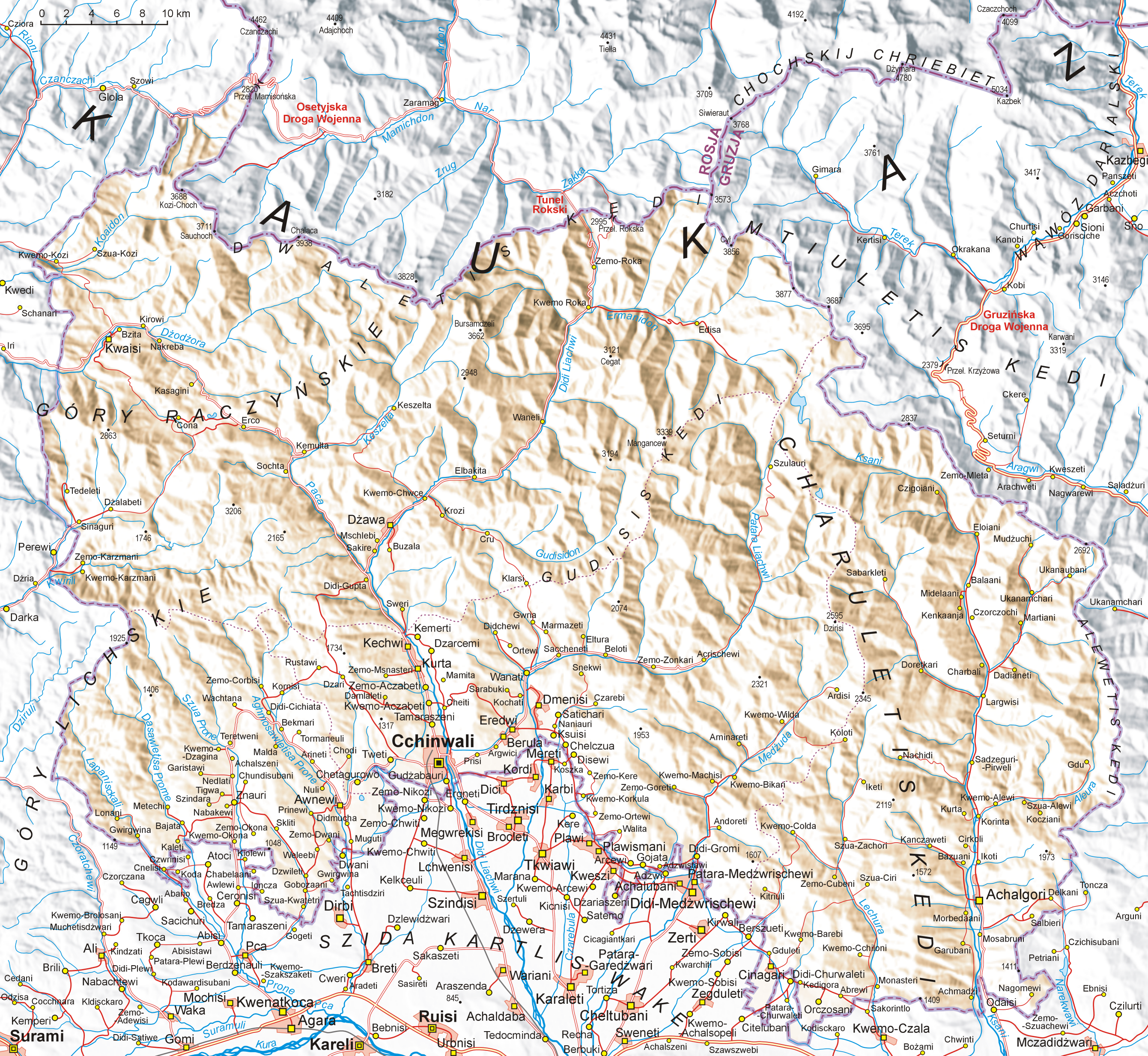
Topographic map of South Ossetia (Polish transcription)

South Ossetia's climate is affected by subtropical influences from the East and Mediterranean influences from the West. The Greater Caucasus range moderates the local climate by serving as a barrier against cold air from the north, which results in the fact that, even at great heights, it is warmer there than in the Northern Caucasus. Climatic zones in South Ossetia are determined by distance from the Black Sea and by altitude. The plains of eastern Georgia are shielded from the influence of the Black Sea by mountains that provide a more continental climate.

The foothills and mountainous areas (including the Greater Caucasus Mountains) experience cool, wet summers and snowy winters, with snow cover often exceeding two metres in many regions. The penetration of humid air masses from the Black Sea to the west of South Ossetia is often blocked by the Likhi mountain range. The wettest periods of the year in South Ossetia generally occur during spring and autumn while the winter and summer months tend to be the driest. Elevation plays an important role in South Ossetia where climatic conditions above 1,500 m (4,921 ft) are considerably colder than in any lower-lying areas. The regions that lie above 2,000 m (6,562 ft) frequently experience frost even during the summer months.

The average temperature in South Ossetia in January is around +4 degrees Celsius, and the average temperature in July is around +20.3 degrees Celsius. The average yearly liquid precipitation in South Ossetia is around 598 millimetres. In general, summer temperatures average 20 °C (68 °F) to 24 °C (75.2 °F) across much of South Ossetia, and winter temperatures average 2 °C (35.6 °F) to 4 °C (39.2 °F). Humidity is relatively low and rainfall across South Ossetia averages 500 to 800 mm (19.7 to 31.5 in) per year, but Alpine and highland regions have distinct microclimates. At higher elevations, precipitation is sometimes twice as heavy as in the eastern plains of Georgia. Alpine conditions begin at about 2,100 m (6,890 ft), and above 3,600 m (11,811 ft) snow and ice are present year-round.

The Russian troops who patrol the borders of South Ossetia have reportedly been expanding the boundaries of the region through “encroaching occupation”, meaning they surreptitiously advance several feet at a time into Georgian-held territory.

== Government and politics ==
Until the armed conflict of August 2008, South Ossetia consisted of a checkerboard of Georgian-inhabited and Ossetian-inhabited towns and villages. The largely Ossetian capital city of Tskhinvali and most of the other Ossetian-inhabited communities were governed by the separatist government, while the Georgian-inhabited villages and towns were administered by the Georgian government. This close proximity and the intermixing of the two communities has made the Georgian–Ossetian conflict particularly dangerous, since any attempt to create an ethnically pure territory would involve population transfers on a large scale.

The political dispute has yet to be resolved and the South Ossetian separatist authorities govern the region with effective independence from Tbilisi. Although talks have been held periodically between the two sides, little progress was made under the government of Eduard Shevardnadze (1993–2003). His successor Mikheil Saakashvili (elected 2004) made the reassertion of Georgian governmental authority a political priority. Having successfully put an end to the de facto independence of the southwestern province of Ajaria in May 2004, he pledged to seek a similar solution in South Ossetia. After the 2004 clashes, the Georgian government has intensified its efforts to bring the problem to international attention. On 25 January 2005, President Saakashvili presented a Georgian vision for resolving the South Ossetian conflict at the Parliamentary Assembly of the Council of Europe session in Strasbourg. Late in October, Prime Minister Zurab Noghaideli presented the Georgian action plan at the OSCE Permanent Council at Vienna, to which the US government and the OSCE expressed their support. The South Ossetian de facto authorities reacted by saying the plan is "not realistic" and "contains nothing new for the South Ossetian side". On 6 December, the OSCE Ministerial Council in Ljubljana adopted a resolution supporting the Georgian peace plan. Prior to the Ministerial Council, the Russian Foreign Ministry rejected the Georgian plan, saying that it differed from the plan Saakashvili presented at the UN General Assembly in September 2004, which was favoured by the South Ossetian side. After the OSCE resolution, the South Ossetian side surprised many with their own initiative reminiscent to the Georgian plan, triggering optimism in Tbilisi.

=== Government ===
According to Article 47 of the South Ossetian Constitution, the president of the Republic of South Ossetia is the head of state and head of the executive branch of government. The president of the republic is elected for five years by direct popular vote, with a maximum of two consecutive terms for the same person. South Ossetia's legislative body is the unicameral parliament, which consists of 34 members who are elected by popular vote for five years in a mixed system of 17 single-member constituencies and 17 delegates elected through proportional representation (article 57).

Since 23 June 2026, Marat Kambolov has been the acting president of the Republic, following the resignation of his predecessor, Alan Gagloev.

=== Military ===
South Ossetia's armed forces in 2017 were partially incorporated into the Russian Armed Forces. The Russian armed forces have established the 4th Guards Military Base in South Ossetia, which is based in Tskhinvali, with training sites north from the city (Dzartsem) and near Java, where a branch of the base is hosted at the village Ugardanta for the Russian Airborne Forces. Furthermore, Russia has established nearly 20 so-called "militarized border guard bases" near the boundary line with Tbilisi-controlled Georgia, which fall under the command and responsibility of the Russian FSB and are tasked with enforcing a "state border" between South Ossetia and Georgia. An estimated 3,000–3,500 Russian servicemen are deployed in South Ossetia, while an estimated 1,500 FSB personnel are deployed at the border guard bases. According to South Ossetian de facto authorities, about 450 South Ossetian citizens are employed at the 4th Russian Military Base.

On 26 March 2022, president Bibilov said that South Ossetia had sent troops to aid Russia during the 2022 Russian invasion of Ukraine, stating his troops "understand perfectly that they are going to defend Russia, they are going to defend Ossetia too". Roughly a quarter of these troops deserted and hitchhiked back to South Ossetia. Bibilov later said that the deserters would face no punishment.

== Status ==
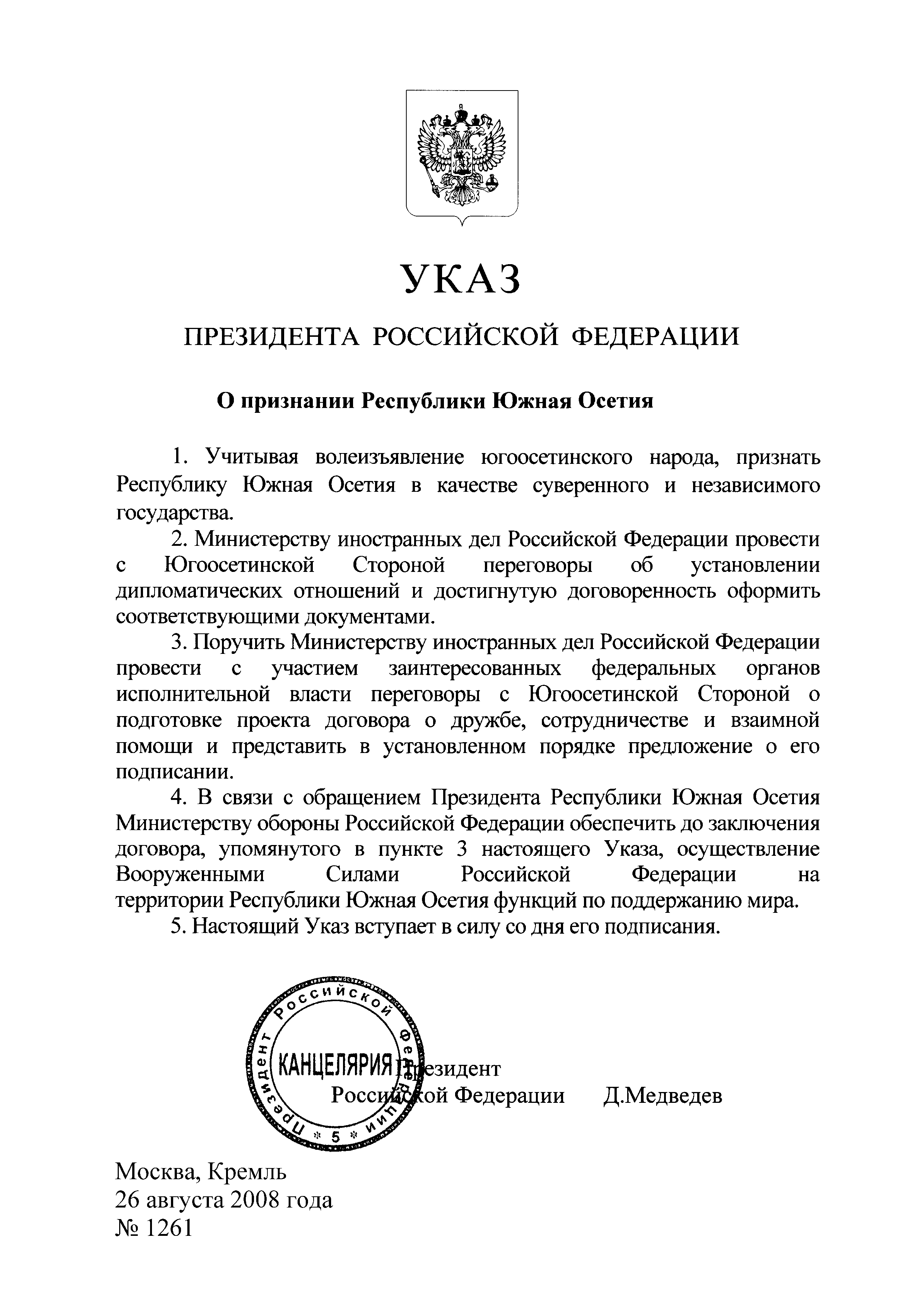
Russian Presidential Decree No. 1261 recognising South Ossetian independence

Following the 2008 South Ossetia war, Russia recognised South Ossetia as independent. This unilateral recognition by Russia was met by condemnation from Western Blocs, such as NATO, Organization for Security and Co-operation in Europe (OSCE) and the European Council due to the violation of Georgia's territorial integrity. The EU's diplomatic response to the news was delayed by disagreements between eastern European states, the UK wanting a harsher response and Germany, France and other states' desire not to isolate Russia. Former US envoy Richard Holbrooke said the conflict could encourage separatist movements in other former Soviet states along Russia's western border. Several days later, Nicaragua became the second country to recognise South Ossetia. Venezuela recognised South Ossetia on 10 September 2009, becoming the third UN member state to do so.

The European Union, the Council of Europe, North Atlantic Treaty Organization (NATO) and most UN member countries do not recognise South Ossetia as an independent state. The de facto republic governed by the secessionist government held a second independence referendum on 12 November 2006, after its first referendum in 1992 was not recognised by most governments as valid. According to the Tskhinvali election authorities, the referendum turned out a majority for independence from Georgia where 99% of South Ossetian voters supported independence and the turnout for the vote was 95%. The referendum was monitored by a team of 34 international observers from Germany, Austria, Poland, Sweden and other countries at 78 polling stations. However, it was not recognised internationally by the UN, European Union, OSCE, NATO and the Russian Federation, given the lack of ethnic Georgian participation and the illegality of such a referendum without recognition from the Georgian government in Tbilisi. The European Union, OSCE and NATO condemned the referendum.

Parallel to the secessionist held referendum and elections, to Eduard Kokoity, the then President of South Ossetia, the Ossetian opposition movement (People of South Ossetia for Peace) organised their own elections contemporaneously in Georgian-controlled areas within South Ossetia, in which Georgian and some Ossetian inhabitants of the region voted in favour of Dmitry Sanakoyev as the alternative President of South Ossetia. The alternative elections of Sanakoyev claimed full support of the ethnic Georgian population.

In April 2007, Georgia created the Provisional Administrative Entity of South Ossetia, (Note: ICG "Georgia’s South Ossetia Conflict: Make Haste Slowly", Chapter II.C. "The New Temporary Administrative Unit", page 7-8.) staffed by ethnic Ossetian members of the separatist movement. Dmitry Sanakoyev was assigned as the leader of the Entity. It was intended that this provisional administration would negotiate with central Georgian authorities regarding its final status and conflict resolution. On 10 May 2007, Sanakoyev was appointed by the President of Georgia as the Head of South Ossetian Provisional Administrative Entity.

On 13 July 2007, Georgia set up a state commission, chaired by the Prime Minister Zurab Noghaideli, to develop South Ossetia's autonomous status within the Georgian state. According to the Georgian officials, the status was to be elaborated within the framework of "an all-inclusive dialogue" with all the forces and communities within the Ossetian society.

South Ossetia, Transnistria and Abkhazia are sometimes referred to as post-Soviet "frozen conflict" zones.

=== Plans for annexation to the Russian Federation ===
On 30 August 2008, Tarzan Kokoity, the Deputy Speaker of South Ossetia's parliament, announced that the region would soon be absorbed into Russia, so that South and North Ossetians could live together in one united Russian state. Russian and South Ossetian forces began giving residents in Akhalgori, the biggest town in the predominantly ethnic Georgian eastern part of South Ossetia, the choice of accepting Russian citizenship or leaving. However, Eduard Kokoity, the then president of South Ossetia, later stated that South Ossetia would not give up its independence by joining Russia: "We are not going to say no to our independence, which has been achieved at the expense of many lives; South Ossetia has no plans to join Russia." Civil Georgia has said that this statement contradicts previous ones made by Kokoity earlier that day, when he indicated that South Ossetia would join North Ossetia in the Russian Federation.

The South Ossetian and Russian presidents signed an "alliance and integration" treaty on 18 March 2015. The agreement includes provisions to incorporate the South Ossetian military into Russia's armed forces, integrate the customs service of South Ossetia into that of Russia's, and commit Russia to paying state worker salaries in South Ossetia at rates equal to those in the North Caucasus Federal District. The Associated Press described the treaty as calling for "nearly full integration" and compared it to a 2014 agreement between Russia and Abkhazia. The Georgian Foreign Ministry described the signing of the treaty as "actual annexation" of the disputed region by Russia, and the United States and European Union said they would not recognise it.

In another move towards integration with the Russian Federation, South Ossetian President Leonid Tibilov proposed in December 2015 a name change to South Ossetia–Alania – in analogy with North Ossetia–Alania, a Russian federal subject. Tibilov furthermore suggested holding a referendum on joining the Russian Federation prior to April 2017, which would lead to a united "Ossetia–Alania". In April 2016, Tibilov said he intended to hold the referendum before August of that year. However, on 30 May, Tibilov postponed the referendum until after the presidential election due in April 2017. At the name-change referendum, nearly 80 per cent of those who voted endorsed the name-change, while the presidential race was won by Anatoliy Bibilov – against the incumbent, Tibilov, who had been supported by Moscow and who, unlike Bibilov, was ready to heed Moscow's wish for the integration referendum not be held any time soon.

On 30 March 2022, President Anatoly Bibilov announced his intention to begin legal proceedings in the near future to integration with the Russian Federation, although he subsequently lost the presidency in the 2022 South Ossetian presidential election.

=== Law on occupied territories of Georgia ===
"The Law of Georgia on Occupied Territories" (in Georgian), 23 October 2008

In late October 2008, President Saakashvili signed into law legislation on the occupied territories passed by the Georgian Parliament. The law covers the breakaway regions of Abkhazia and Tskhinvali (territories of former South Ossetian Autonomous Oblast). The law spells out restrictions on free movement to, economic activity and concluding real estate transactions in these territories. In particular, according to the law, foreign citizens should enter the two breakaway regions only through Georgia. Entry into Abkhazia should be carried out from Zugdidi Municipality and into South Ossetia from Gori Municipality. (Note: Article 4.1, Law on Occupied Territories.)

The main road leading to South Ossetia from the rest of Georgia passes through the Gori Municipality. However, this road is closed in both directions at Ergneti since 2008. The main crossing point that remained open for Georgians and South Ossetians, to the Akhalgori district, has been closed by South Ossetia since 2019. Furthermore, the South Ossetian authorities only allow entry of foreigners "through the territory of the Russian Federation".

The Georgian legislation, however, also lists "special" cases in which entry into the breakaway regions will not be regarded as illegal. It stipulates that a special permit on entry into the breakaway regions can be issued if the trip there "serves Georgia's state interests; peaceful resolution of the conflict; de-occupation or humanitarian purposes." (Note: Article 4.3, Law on Occupied Territories.) The law also bans any type of economic activity – entrepreneurial or non- entrepreneurial, if such activities require permits, licences or registration in accordance with Georgian legislation. It also bans air, sea and railway communications and international transit via the regions, mineral exploration and money transfers. (Note: Article 6, Law on Occupied Territories.) The provision covering economic activities is retroactive, going back to 1990. (Note: Article 11.2, Law on Occupied Territories.)

The law says that the Russian Federation – the state which has carried out military occupation – is fully responsible for the violation of human rights in Abkhazia and South Ossetia. The Russian Federation, according to the document, is also responsible for compensation of material and moral damage inflicted on Georgian citizens, stateless persons and foreign citizens, who are in Georgia and enter the occupied territories with appropriate permits. (Note: Article 7, Law on Occupied Territories.) The law also says that de facto state agencies and officials operating in the occupied territories are regarded by Georgia as illegal. (Note: Article 8, Law on Occupied Territories.) The law will remain in force until "the full restoration of Georgian jurisdiction" over the breakaway regions is realised. (Note: Article 11.3, Law on Occupied Territories.)

In November 2009, during the opening ceremony of a new Georgian Embassy building in Kyiv, Ukraine, Georgian President Mikheil Saakashvili stated that residents of South Ossetia and Abkhazia could also use its facilities: "I would like to assure you, my dear friends, that this is your home, as well, and here you will always be able to find support and understanding".

== Economy ==
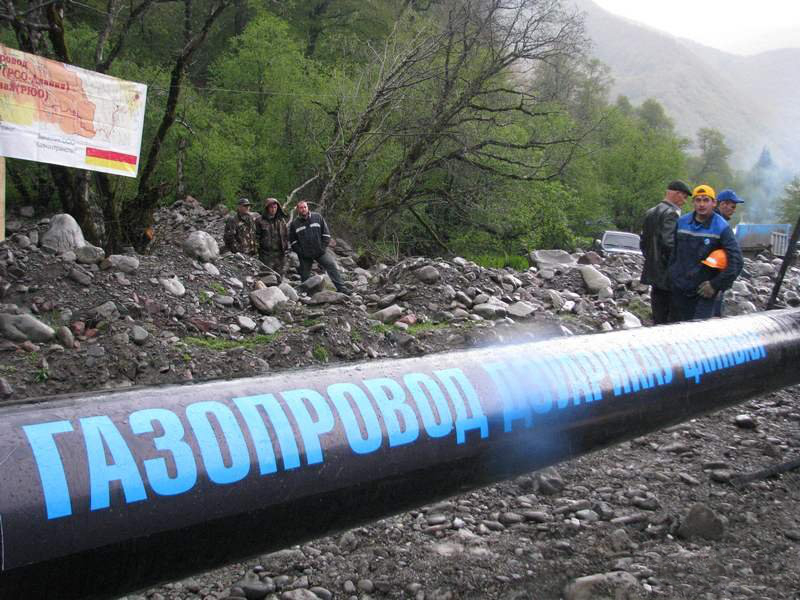
The Dzuarikau–Tskhinvali pipeline, delivering natural gas from Russia to South Ossetia, went online in 2009.

South Ossetia's economy is primarily agricultural, although less than 10% of South Ossetia's land area is cultivated. Cereals, fruit and vines are the major produce. Forestry and cattle industries are also maintained. A number of industrial facilities also exist, particularly around the capital, Tskhinvali. Following the war in the 1990s, South Ossetia struggled economically. South Ossetian GDP was estimated at US$15 million (US$250 per capita) in a work published in 2002. (Note: ICG, "Georgia: Avoiding War in South Ossetia", page 11, based on Mamuka Areshidze, "Current Economic Causes of Conflict in Georgia", unpublished report for UK Department for International Development (DFID), 2002 (footnote 114)) In 2017, the Administration of South Ossetia estimated its GDP to be nearly 100 million US dollars. South Ossetia's poverty threshold stood at 3,062 rubles a month in the fourth quarter of 2007, or 23.5 per cent below Russia's average, while South Ossetians have incomparably smaller incomes.

The majority of the population survives on subsistence farming. The South Ossetian authorities planned to improve finances by boosting the local production of flour and thus reducing the need for flour imports. For this purpose, the area planted with wheat was increased tenfold in 2008 from 130 hectares to 1,500 hectares. The wheat harvest in 2008 was expected to be 2,500 tons of grain. The South Ossetian Agriculture ministry also imported some tractors in 2008, and was expecting delivery of more farm machinery in 2009.

Before the 2008 Russo-Georgian War, South Ossetia's industry consisted of 22 small factories, with a total production of 61.6 million rubles in 2006. In 2007, only 7 factories were functioning. In March 2009, it was reported that most of the production facilities were standing idle and were in need of repairs. Even successful factories have a shortage of workers, are in debt and have a shortage of working capital. One of the largest local enterprises is the Emalprovod factory, which has 130 employees. Additionally, after the 2008 war, Georgia cut off supplies of electricity to the Akhalgori region, which aggravated the socio-economic situation in that area. (Note: ICG, "South Ossetia: The Burden of Recognition", page 6, "Electricity and gas, which prior to the war came from the adjacent Dusheti region, have been shut off by Tbilisi, which says it cannot control their use in Akhalgori.57 Electricity is now supplied from Tskhinvali, where authorities say they are still hopeful Georgia will resume the gas supply.")

The South Ossetian economy withered as a result of the 2008 war as its export of agricultural goods to Georgia stopped and it could no longer serve as a conduit between Russia and Georgia.

By the end of 2021, the number of employed people was determined at 20,734 while 2,449 persons were registered as unemployed, on a total working age population of 34,308 (men 18–65, women 18–60). (Note: South Ossetia Statistical digest for January–December 2021, Table 1.3, page 14; Table 2.1 & 2.3, pages 23–24) Virtually the only significant economic asset that South Ossetia possesses is control of the Roki Tunnel that is used to link Russia and Georgia, from which the South Ossetian government reportedly obtained a large part of its budget by levying customs duties on freight traffic before the war. (Note: ICG, "Georgia: Avoiding War in South Ossetia", page 11, "With regards to the Ergneti market, South Ossetian authorities claim the trade was legal because they imposed custom duties on the goods from Russia. "A large part of our budget" was financed by these duties, one stated.") (Note: De Waal et al, Beyond Frozen Conflict, chapter 6. South Ossetia Today) (Note: chapter Between pragmatism and idealism: businesses coping with conflict in the South Caucasus: "Customs duties on the import and export of goods to and from Russia make up 90 percent of the republic’s budget", via footnote 11 citing Dzhikaev, V. and Parastaev, A. (2004) ‘Economy and Conflict in South Ossetia’ in Champain et al op. cit.)

Since the 2008 war, South Ossetia and its economy are critically dependent on Russian economic assistance, and a year after the war, former President Edurard Kokoity was grateful for the Russian aid for reconstruction work. According to reports Russian donations made up nearly 99% of the budget of South Ossetia by 2010. (Note: ICG, "South Ossetia: The Burden of Recognition", page 4, " The budget may have increased by half, from 2.7 billion roubles ($87 million) in 2009 to 4.3 billion roubles ($140 million) in 2010, but 98.7 per cent of the total is Russian aid") By 2021 this has been reduced to 83%. (Note: South Ossetia Statistical digest for January–December 2021, Table 17.1, page 169-170: Financial assistance to the Republic of South Ossetia of the Russian Federation 7.3 billion rubles ($85m) on a total budget of 8.8 billion rubles ($103m).) A new backup power transmission line running from Russia to South Ossetia was put into operation in November 2021, helping to ensure uninterrupted power supply to the region. It cost more than 1.3 billion rubles ($17m) to construct and was built within the framework of the Russian Investment programme in South Ossetia.

In 2016, Armenia tried to persuade Georgia to open a transit route between Georgia and South Ossetia, but Georgia refused.

The socio-economic development programme of South Ossetia for the 2022–2025 period is financed by Russia. The aim of the programme is for South Ossetia to reach the socio-economic indicators of the North Caucasus Federal District in 2025.

=== Currency ===
==== Zarin ====
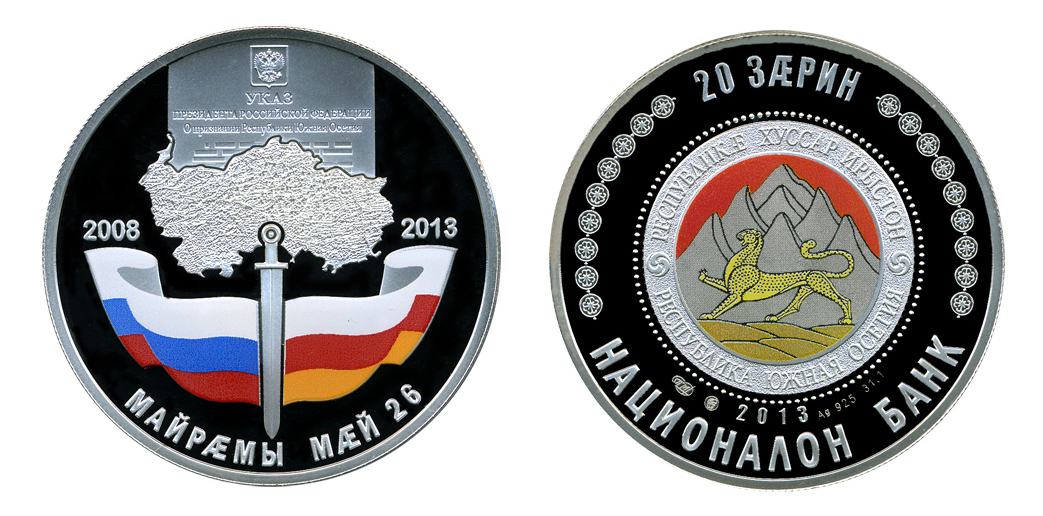
A 20 Zarin coin commemorating Russia's recognition of South Ossetian independence

One of South Ossetia's official currencies is the Zarin which comes in the following denominations; 20, 25, and 50 Zarin coins, and a 100 Zarin bar. Despite being the official currency, the Zarin is not in circulation, and are used for ceremonial purposes, depicting key events and people in South Ossetian history and are either pure sterling silver (.925) or pure gold (.999) and are largely collector's items.

==== South Ossetian ruble ====
South Ossetia's official circulated currency is the South Ossetian ruble, modelled off the Russian ruble, with the same denominations, decimalised to 100 Kopecks. South Ossetia mints 1, 5, 10, 20 and 50 Kopeck coins, as well as 1, 2, 5, 10, 50 and 100 ruble coins. South Ossetia does not print any paper money. The South Ossetian ruble is pegged to the Russian ruble, and is legal tender in South Ossetia, Russia, and Abkhazia, however, is in far less circulation than the Russian ruble, and are also largely ceremonial.

==== Russian ruble ====
By far the most widely used currency in South Ossetia, and one of the Republic's official currencies, is the Russian ruble, which has been used in the day-to-day lives of South Ossetians since their independence in 1991. Additionally, since the South Ossetian ruble is pegged to the Russian ruble, the two are often used interchangeably, and due to the lack of South Ossetian paper money, it is common for South Ossetians to use Russian paper money, but South Ossetian coins.

== Demographics ==
Ethnic map of the Caucasus from 1995. Ossetians live in North and South Ossetia

Ethnic groups in South Ossetia (2015 census)
1. Ossetians (89.9%)
2. Georgians (7.41%)
3. Russians (1.14%)
4. Armenians (0.71%)
5. other (0.81%)

Before the Georgian–Ossetian conflict roughly two-thirds of the population of South Ossetia was Ossetian and 25–30% was Georgian. The eastern quarter of South Ossetia, around the town and district of Akhalgori, was predominantly Georgian, while the centre and west were predominantly Ossetian. Much of the mountainous north is sparsely inhabited (see map at Languages of the Caucasus).

The Georgian 2002 census was incomplete with regard to South Ossetia, as it took place only in areas under effective Georgian control at the time. This concerned the Georgian populated areas of Akhalgori district and the Georgian communities around Tskhinvali, in the Patara Liachvi and Didi Liakhvi valleys, although according to some estimates there were 47,000 ethnic Ossetians and 17,500 ethnic Georgians in South Ossetia in 2007.

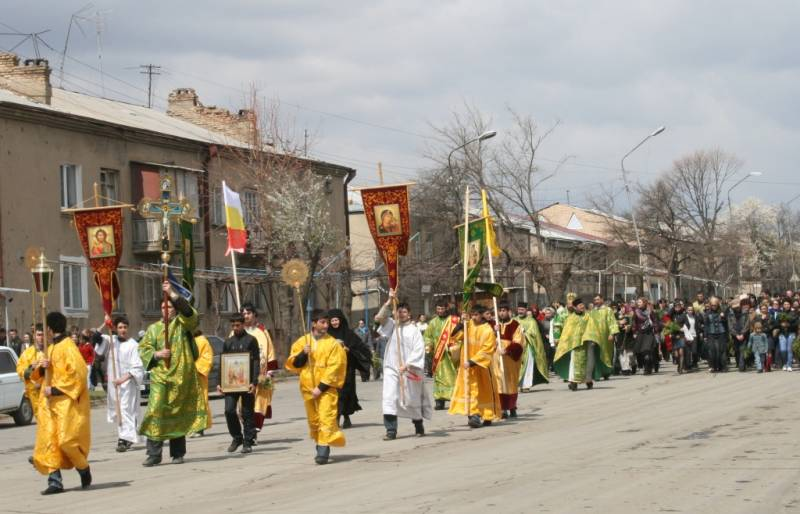
Palm Sunday procession in Tskhinvali

2009 population estimate: During the war, according to Georgian officials, 15,000 Georgians moved to Georgia proper; South Ossetian officials indicate that 30,000 Ossetians fled to North Ossetia, and a total of 500 citizens of South Ossetia were killed.

According to the 2015 census conducted by the South Ossetian authorities, the region's total population was 53,532, including 48,146 Ossetians (89.9%), 3,966 Georgians (7.4%), and 610 Russians. The Georgian authorities have questioned the accuracy of these data. Estimates based on official birth rates and school attendance suggest it may have been around 39,000 inhabitants, and an independent estimate from 2009 put the population at 26,000.

According to the South Ossetian Statistical agency the population estimate was 56,520 per 1 January 2022. Of these, 33,054 lived in Tskhinvali. (Note: Page 9, Statistical Digest 2021, State Statistics of Republic of South Ossetia.)

Eastern Orthodoxy is the major religion practised in South Ossetia, by Ossetians, Georgians and Russians.

Census year	Ossetians		Georgians		Russians		Armenians		Jews		Others		Total
Census year	#	%	#	%	#	%	#	%	#	%	#	%	Total
1926	60,351	69.07%	23,538	26.94%	157	0.18%	1,374	1.57%	1,739	1.99%	216	0.25%	87,375
1939	72,266	68.10%	27,525	25.94%	2,111	1.99%	1,537	1.45%	1,979	1.86%	700	0.66%	106,118
1959	63,698	65.80%	26,584	27.46%	2,380	2.46%	1,555	1.61%	1,723	1.78%	867	0.90%	96,807
1970	66,073	66.46%	28,125	28.29%	1,574	1.58%	1,254	1.26%	1,485	1.49%	910	0.92%	99,421
1979	65,077	66.41%	28,187	28.77%	2,046	2.09%	953	0.97%	654	0.67%	1,071	1.09%	97,988
1989	65,232	66.21%	28,544	28.97%	2,128	2.16%	984	1.00%	397	0.40%	1,242	1.26%	98,527
2015	48,146	89.94%	3,966	7.41%	610	1.14%	378	0.71%	1	0.00%	431	0.81%	53,532

=== Education ===
The country's principal university is South Ossetian State University in Tskhinvali. After the Russo-Georgian War in 2008, education officials attempted to place most university-bound students from South Ossetia in Russian post-secondary education institutions.

== Culture ==
=== Sport ===
South Ossetia has a national football team, which is not a member of FIFA or UEFA. The team won the 2019 CONIFA European Football Cup.

== See also ==
- North Ossetia-Alania
- 2008 Georgia–Russia crisis
- Abkhazia–South Ossetia relations
- Community for Democracy and Rights of Nations
- Donetsk People's Republic–South Ossetia relations
- Military of South Ossetia
- Russia–South Ossetia relations
- South Ossetian passport
- Vehicle registration plates of South Ossetia
- List of states with limited recognition

== Sources ==
- Foltz, Richard (2022). The Ossetes: Modern-Day Scythians of the Caucasus. London: Bloomsbury. ISBN 9780755618453. Archived from the original on 18 February 2023.
- ОСЕТИНСКИЙ ВОПРОС [Ossetian Question] (in Russian). Tbilisi. 1994. Archived from the original on 21 June 2014.
- Souleimanov, Emil (2013). Understanding Ethnopolitical Conflict: Karabakh, South Ossetia, and Abkhazia Wars Reconsidered. Palgrave Macmillan. ISBN 9781137280237. Archived from the original on 18 February 2023.
