= North Ossetian Autonomous Soviet Socialist Republic =

Entity within the Russian SFSR

North Ossetian Autonomous Soviet Socialist Republic Цӕгат Ирыстоны ACCP (Iron Ossetic) Северо-Осетинская АССР (Russian)
- ASSR of the Russian SFSR; Republic of the Russian Federation
- 1936–1993
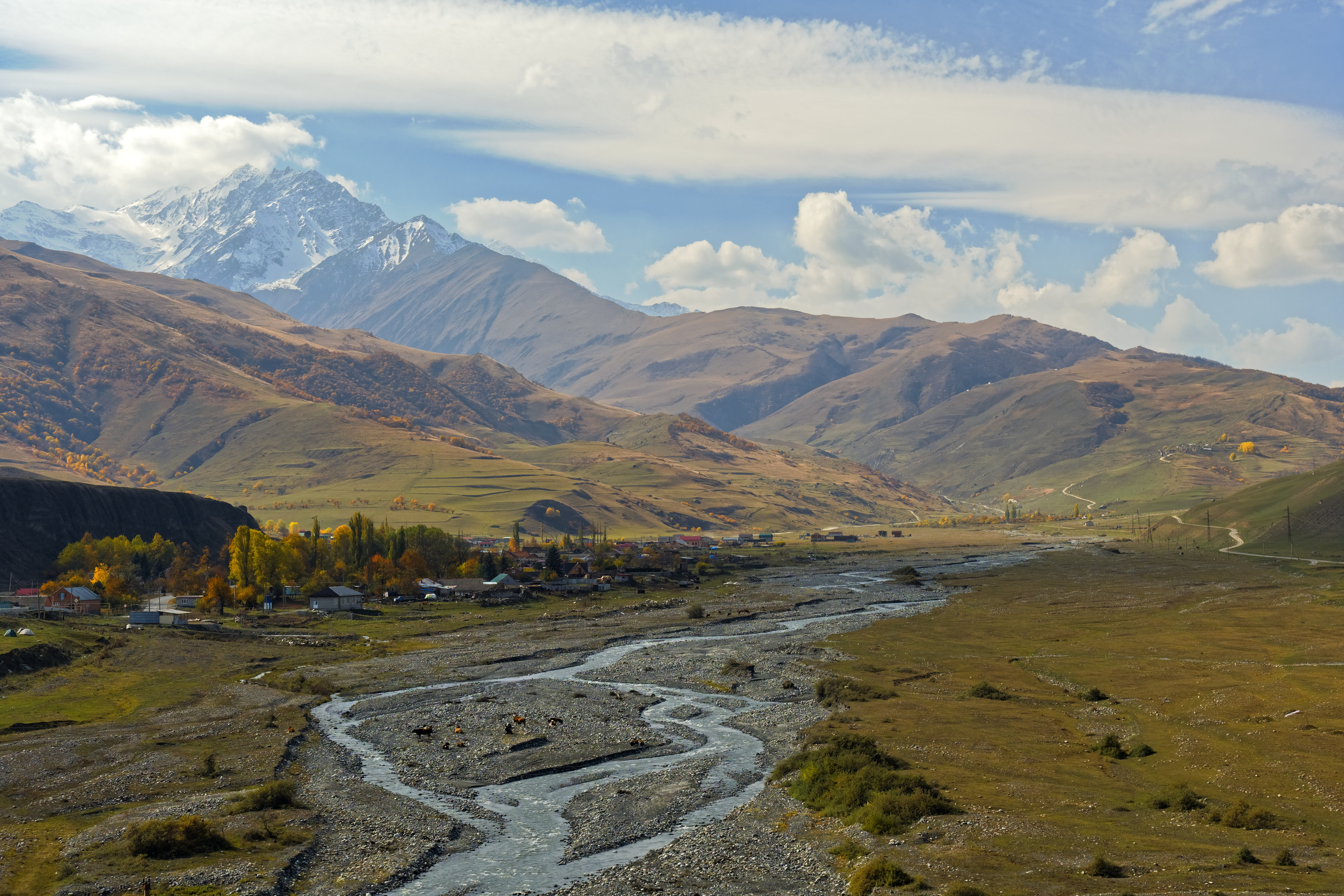

- Flag (1981–1991) Emblem (1978–1990)

- Capital: Ordzhonikidze (Vladikavkaz)
- Demonym: North Ossetian; Ossetian
- Government
  - Type: Soviet republic
- History
  - Established: 5 December 1936
  - Sovereignty declared: 20 July 1990
  - Renamed to the Republic of the North Ossetia–Alania: 9 November 1993
Preceded by	Succeeded by
North Ossetian Autonomous Oblast	North Ossetia–Alania
- Today part of: Russia · North Ossetia–Alania

The North Ossetian Autonomous Soviet Socialist Republic (Iron Ossetic: Цӕгат Ирыстоны Автономон Советон Социалистон Республикӕ, romanized: Tsagât Ireštone Âvtonomon Šovêton Šotsiâlišton Rêšpublika; Russian: Северо-Осетинская Автономная Советская Социалистическая Республика, romanized: Severo-Osetinskaya Avtonomnaya Sovetskaya Sotsialisticheskaya Respublika) was an autonomous republic of the Russian SFSR within the Soviet Union. It existed from 5 December 1936 until 9 November 1993, when it became the Republic of North Ossetia (since 1994 the Republic of North Ossetia-Alania), a federal subject of Russia.

== History ==
In 1990 the North Ossetian ASSR declared itself independent as part of rising ethnic conflict with Ingushetia. Originally part of the Ingush territory was transferred to North Ossetia in 1944, bringing with it thousands of Ingush people, and with the dissolution of the Soviet Union conflicts began.

During the summer and early autumn of 1992, there was a steady increase in the militancy of Ingush nationalists. At the same time, there was a steady increase in incidents of organized harassment, kidnapping and rape against Ingush inhabitants of North Ossetia by their Ossetian neighbors, police, security forces, and militia. This would eventually lead to the Ossetian–Ingush Conflict.

== Population ==
Year	Population	Source
1939	329 205	1939 Soviet census
1959	450 581	1959 Soviet census
1970	552 581	1970 Soviet census
1979	596 921	1979 Soviet census
1989	634 009	1989 Soviet census

== See also ==
- North Ossetian Regional Committee of the Communist Party of the Soviet Union
- South Ossetia in the Soviet Union
