= Coat of arms of South Ossetia =

Republic of South Ossetia
- Armiger: Republic of South Ossetia
- Adopted: 1995
- Shield: Disc gules, a leopard passant or spotted sable on a ground or with a background of seven mountains argent
- Other elements: Республикӕ Хуссар Ирыстон, Республика Южная Осетия

South Ossetia is a region in the North Caucasus that is under the effective control of the self-declared Republic of South Ossetia but recognized by most of the international community as part of Georgia.

The emblem of the Republic of South Ossetia consists of a red disc featuring a Caucasian leopard with seven white mountains in the background. The blazon is "disc gules, a leopard passant or spotted sable on a ground or with a background of seven mountains argent." The mountains symbolize the Ossetian landscape, while the leopard is an iconic inhabitant of the Caucasus mountains.

The coat of arms of the Republic of South Ossetia were adopted on 19 May 1999 by the Parliament of South Ossetia. The design is based on Vakhushti Bagrationi's "Banner of Ossetia" which dates from 1735. Around the shield, the name of the country is written in Ossetian (Республикӕ Хуссар Ирыстон) above and in Russian (Республика Южная Осетия) below.

== Historical emblems ==
Between 1922 and 1990, South Ossetia was an autonomous oblast of the Georgian Soviet Socialist Republic known as the South Ossetian Autonomous Oblast. As an autonomous oblast, it didn't have its own coat of arms, instead the Emblem of the Georgian SSR was used for official purposes.

Prior to the adoption of the current coat of arms in 1995, Lyudvig Chibirov used a design featuring an eagle embazoned with a Triskelion in the South Ossetian national colors, with a Wasamonga cup, a pole-axe, an oak branch, hop and ears of wheat, the gifts God gave to Narts in Assianism tradition.

The Government of Georgia established a Provisional Administration of South Ossetia in April 2007. It used an emblem depicting a Caucasian leopard and mountainous landscape without a surrounding legend. The provisional administration was abolished on 31 December 2025.

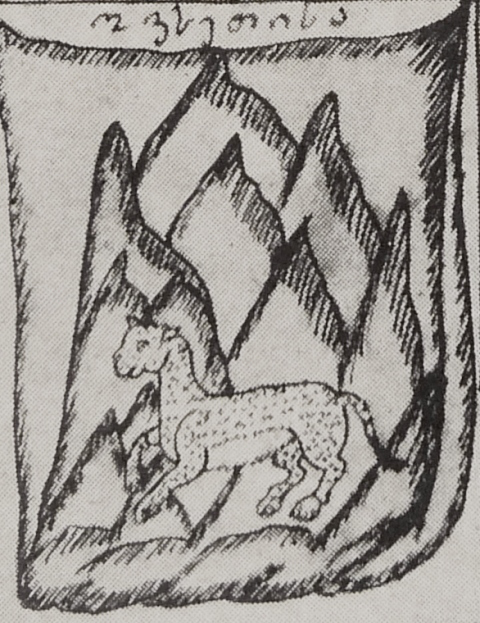
Historical Banner of Ossetia by Vakhushti of Kartli (1735)

Coat of arms of the Tiflis Governorate (1878–1917)

Original coat of arms used by Lyudvig Chibirov (1991–1995)

Emblem of the Administration of South Ossetia (2007–2025)

== See also ==
- Flag of South Ossetia
- Coat of arms of North Ossetia
- National anthem of South Ossetia
