= Valeriy Hubulov =

South Ossetian politician (1966–1998)

Valeriy Khubulov
- Хуыбылты Валерий (Iron Ossetic); Валерий Хубулов (Russian)

Minister of Defense of South Ossetia
- In office 1993–1996?
- Preceded by: Oleg Teziev
- President: Lyudvig Chibirov

Prime Minister of South Ossetia
- Acting
- In office 25 September 1996 – 2 December 1996
- President: Lyudvig Chibirov
- Preceded by: Vladislav Gabarayev
- Succeeded by: Aleksandr Shavlokhov

Personal details
- Born: 6 November 1966 Tskhinvali, Georgian SSR, Soviet Union
- Died: 31 May 1998 (aged 31) Vladikavkaz, Russia

Valeriy Nikolaevich Khubulov (Russian: Валерий Николаевич Хубулов; Iron Ossetic: Хуыбылты Никъалайы фырт Валерий, romanized: Xwybylty Nikhalajy fyrt Valerij; 6 November 1966 – 31 May 1998) was a South Ossetian politician, who was minister of defense and acting prime minister in 1996. He was assassinated in 1998 while in Russia.

== Life ==
Khubulov was born in Tskhinvali in 1966. He was trained as a high school teacher at Tskhinvali University, specializing in physics and mathematics. He graduated in 1990. From 1984 till 1986, Khubulov served in the Soviet Army. In 1991 he was elected the First Secretary of the South Ossetian Komsomol and as a member of the Central Committee of Soviet Komsomol.

Khubulov was an active participant in the 1991–1992 South Ossetia War, leading and coordinating various resistance groups against the Georgian invasion. After the war, he participated in the signing of the Sochi agreement. He also fought in the War in Abkhazia (1992–1993), leading a South Ossetian unit fighting on the Abkhazian side, for which he was awarded the Order of Leon by president Vladislav Ardzinba.

In 1993, Khubulov initiated the founding of the South Ossetian ministry of defense, of which he became the first minister. At the same time, he was also made deputy PM in the cabinet of Gerasim Khugayev.

When PM Vladislav Gabarayev was fired in August 1996, Khubulov, as deputy PM, succeeded him and became acting prime minister for several months, until a replacement was found in Aleksandr Shavlokhov. He was awarded the Order of Leon from the Republic of Abkhazia as well as the Order of Uatsamonga posthumously in 2010 from the Republic of South Ossetia.

== Death ==
Khubulov was assassinated by unknown killers at the market place of Vladikavkaz in North Ossetia–Alania on 31 May 1998. The gunmen opened fire on his car with AK-47s. Later, police found his car blown up in the yard of a neighbouring school, but the murderers were never caught.

Political offices
Preceded by Vladislav Gabarayev	Prime Minister of South Ossetia; 1996	Succeeded by Aleksandr Shavlokhov
