= Oleg Teziyev =

South Ossetian politician (born 1948)

- Тезиты Олег (Iron Ossetic); Олег Тезиев (Russian)
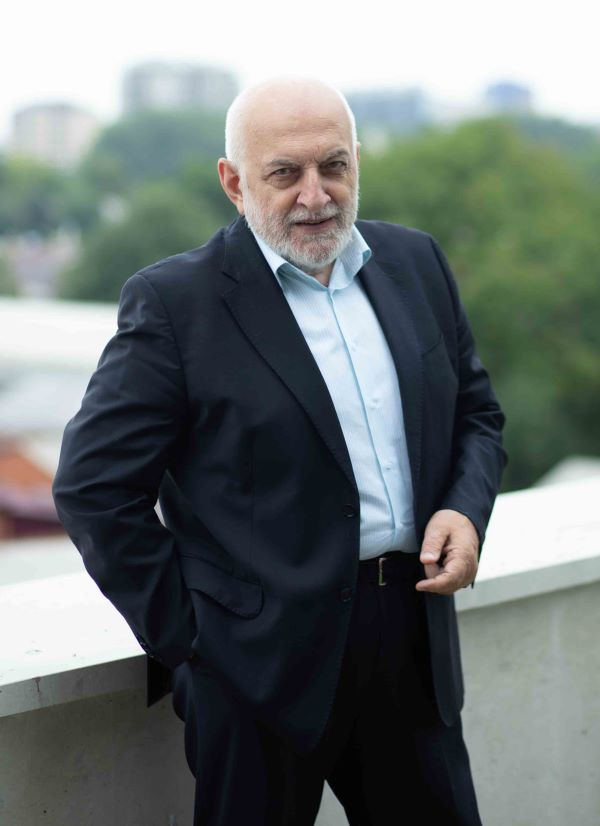
- Teziev in 2016

1st Prime Minister of South Ossetia
- In office 28 November 1991 – October 1993
- President: Lyudvig Chibirov
- Preceded by: Position established
- Succeeded by: Gerasim Khugayev

1st Minister of Defense of South Ossetia
- In office 1989–1993
- President: Lyudvig Chibirov
- Preceded by: Position established
- Succeeded by: Valeriy Hubulov

Member of the Parliament of South Ossetia

Personal details
- Born: 16 January 1948 (age 78) Kadgaron, North Ossetian ASSR, Soviet Union
- Party: Independent

Oleg Dzherikhanovich Teziyev (Russian: Олег Джериханович Тезиев, Iron Ossetic: Тезиты Джериханы фырт Олег, romanized: Tezity Džerixany fyrt Oleg; born 16 January 1948) is a military commander and soldier from the partially recognized Caucasian Republic of South Ossetia serving as the Republic's first prime minister.

== Biography ==
Oleg Teziev was born in North Ossetia, and is a resident of Vladikavkaz. Teziev's father, Dzherikhan Gablaevich Teziev, was a pilot in the Soviet Air Forces during World War II and his mother, Raisa Gazakovna Tezieva née Vanieva was a local teacher. Oleg would be born on January 16, 1948 in the village of Kadgaron, part of the North Ossetian Autonomous Soviet Socialist Republic. Oleg would frequently change schools due to his father's military service, ultimately graduating from gymnasium in Vladikavkaz, afterwards he studied at the North Caucasus Mining and Metallurgical Institute to become an electrical engineer.

Teziev would serve in the Soviet Army starting in 1972, and from 1981 to 1987 he worked in a local factory before starting one of the first cooperatives in Ossetia, SARMAT, and quickly become one of the regions wealthiest businessmen.

=== Military career ===
During the Dissolution of the Soviet Union, Oleg Teziev formed a people's self defense militia in Tskhinvali. Teziev purchased cars in Russia to be imported into South Ossetia to be transformed into technicals. Teziev's technical convoys would be attacked by both the KGB as well as the local Georgian Police. In one instance a Georgian Self Defense militia in one of the ethnically Georgian villages between Tskhinvali and the Roki Tunnel destroyed one of the technicals killing its two occupants. Teziev also led a militia unit during the Ossetian-Ingush conflict.

Shortly afterwards Teziev was approached in Vladikavkaz in 1989 and offered to be the minister of defense for South Ossetia, then still the South Ossetian Autonomous Oblast. Besides the Parliament of South Ossetia, the militias where the only other functioning organ of state, making Teziev one of the most important people in the autonomy. Teziev organized every district of Tskhinvali to raise its own company of militia complete with a command structure, and personally outfitted them out of his own pocket. Later in 1989 Teziev would begin to fight a series of skirmishes against both the Soviet Government which rejected South Ossetia's autonomy, and local Georgian militias called Forest Brothers raised from ethnically Georgian villages in South Ossetia and supported by Zviad Gamsakhurdia. Teziev would work to make a unified central military command for all the Ossetian militias, as well as raise a South Ossetian OMON unit, commanded by Colonel Vadim Gazzaev. Teziev's militias eventually usurped power from the Georgian Police, with the locals coming to them to settle legal disputes and apprehend criminals. In an effort to professionalize the militias into an actual army, Teziev modeled the militia units after the Soviet Airborne Forces, and built them on the premise of fighting a guerilla war in depth with little supplies and began raiding Georgian artillery positions.

After the Soviet Union was finally dissolved in 1991 most of the equipment reserves in the region where seized by generals and sold off, and the Russian units in South Ossetia withdrew, leaving Teziev to largely supply his militias off equipment he bought from the Chechen Republic of Ichkeria. During his effort to procure weapons Teziev worked with the North Ossetian Mafia, but broke off relations after they attempted to kill him. Teziev also claimed to have made three dummy nuclear bombs made of trace amounts of plutonium to register on a geiger counter in an effort to stave off a Georgian action against South Ossetia. He proclaimed that he had planted one in Tskhinvali, one in Tbilisi, and one in Java. Then he had two foreign journalists, a German and a Japanese, kidnapped, showed one of the fake bombs, and then released. He claimed that the staged nukes were to try and draw Russian and foreign interest into the conflict in South Ossetia. Teziev's forces also raided Russian armories and distributed weapons and ammunition to anyone who asked that spoke Ossetian. Teziev's tenure as Defense Minister would end after the Sochi agreement when Russian authorities moved into the country and threatened to have Teziev arrested for his role in the looting of the armories.

During the Russo-Georgian War Teziev once again served as a commander and claimed to have witnessed Georgian troops throwing grenades into basements full of civilians.

=== Prime minister ===
Teziev served as the first prime minister of South Ossetia, starting on 28 November 1991 as an independent. As the Republic's Head of government, he accepted the JPKF, a joint peacekeeping force of Georgians and Russians, into the Republic while also stating that the ultimate goal of South Ossetia was its annexation into Russia, sooner rather than later.

=== Later career ===
Teziev would also serve as a member of the Parliament of South Ossetia. During which he stated that:

"The issue of joining South Ossetia to Russia is of secondary importance here. The reunification of the two Ossetians is important for the Ossetians. Today, there are only a few nations left in the world that are internally divided (for example, North and South Korea). Ossetia, divided into two territories due to certain historical circumstances, belongs to the same category. I would like with all my heart to wish for the unification to happen as quickly as possible"

After leaving office, Teziev served as chairman of Civic Initiative, a Vladikavkaz-based support group for South Ossetian refugees into North Ossetia. As chairman, Teziev commented on why Ossetians don't want to return to Georgia proper, stating that "Refugees don't trust the law or Georgian authorities," and that "Most of them have settled down in North Ossetia. Their children go to Russian schools and are being raised in another cultural environment."

Teziev returned in an attempt to run for the 2001 South Ossetian presidential election. However, then-incumbent president Lyudvig Chibirov passed a law requiring all candidates to live in South Ossetia for 15 years, barring Teziev from running. During the 2012 South Ossetian presidential election, Teziev accused both Leonid Tibilov and David Sanakoev of misusing public funds for their campaigns, instead of funding the construction of houses. This resulted in upwards of 18,000 Ossetians moving to Russia.

Teziev was a leader of the so-called "Moscow Opposition", consisting of South Ossetians who moved to Russia after the South Ossetia war but returned after the Russo-Georgian War and were discontent with policies of Eduard Kokoity. Teziev helped organize a series of street protests against the Kokoiti administration in 2014.
