= Gerasim Khugayev =

South Ossetian politician (1945–2024)

- Герасим Хугаев (Russian); Герасим Хуыгаты (Iron Ossetic)

2nd Prime Minister of South Ossetia
- In office 25 October 1993 – 16 May 1994
- President: Lyudvig Chibirov
- Preceded by: Oleg Teziev
- Succeeded by: Feliks Zassiev
- In office 19 December 2001 – 31 August 2003
- President: Eduard Kokoity
- Preceded by: Dmitry Sanakoyev
- Succeeded by: Igor Sanakoyev

Personal details
- Born: 15 November 1946 Chasaval, South Ossetian AO, Georgian SSR, Soviet Union
- Died: 22 October 2024 (aged 77)

Gerasim "Rezo" Georgievich Khugayev (Iron Ossetic: Хуыгаты Георгийы фырт Герасим (Резо), romanized: Xwêgatê Géorgiyê fêrt Gérasim (Rézo); Georgian: გერასიმე ხუგაევი; Russian: Герасим (Резо) Георгевич Хугаев; 15 November 1946 – 22 October 2024) was a South Ossetian politician who served as Prime Minister of the Republic of South Ossetia from 1993 to 1994, then again from 2001 to 2003. He was the only South Ossetian Prime Minister to serve more than one time, to date.

== Political career ==
From 1975 until 1981, Khugayev studied at the psychology department of the Lomonosov Moscow State University. In 1981, he was elected party secretary in Kvaisa. After a promotion in 1987, he became a member of the very first session of South Ossetia's parliament. He was also actively involved in the 1991–1992 South Ossetia War, where he commanded a unit. After the war, he first became deputy Prime Minister under PM Oleg Teziev and Head of State Torez Kulumbegov, and then Prime Minister.

Khugayev first served as prime minister from October 1993 until May 1994 under Head of State Lyudvig Chibirov, and then again from December 2001 until August 2003, as the first Prime Minister appointed by President of South Ossetia Eduard Kokoity.

In 1996, Khugayev was deputy PM in the cabinet of Aleksandr Shavlokhov. He was also a candidate in the 1996 presidential election, the first ever held in the country. Khugayev finished 2nd, after incumbent Head of State Lyudvig Chibirov, with 23.9% of the vote.

In 2001, Khugayev led the Eduard Kokoity's campaign for the 2001 presidential elections. After Kokoity won, he appointed Khugayev as his first prime minister.

== Death ==
On 22 October 2024, it was announced that Khugayev had died at the age of 77.

Political offices
Preceded by Oleg Teziev	Prime Minister of South Ossetia; 1993–1994	Succeeded by Feliks Zassiev
Preceded by Dmitry Sanakoyev	Prime Minister of South Ossetia; 2001–2003	Succeeded by Igor Sanakoyev
