= Alan Dzhioev (Parpat) =

South Ossetian military commander

- Born: 18 October 1965; Tskhinvali, South Ossetian Autonomous Oblast, Georgian SSR, Soviet Union
- Died: 14 November 1993 (aged 28); Tskhinvali, South Ossetia
- Military career
- Allegiance: South Ossetia
- Service years: 1989–1993
- Rank: Commander
- Nickname: Parpat
- Conflicts: 1991-1992 South Ossetia War, Ossetian-Ingush conflict, War in Abkhazia (1992–1993)
- Awards: Order of Uatsamonga (posthumous, 2021)

The Alan Sogratovich Dzhioev (Russian: Джиоев, Алан Согратович, Iron Ossetic: Джиоты Сограты фырт Алан, romanized: Jioty Sograty fyrt Alan; (18 October 1965 – 14 November 1993), better known by his callsign Parpat (Ossetian for "nimble"), was a South Ossetian military commander. He was one of the founders of the Armed Forces of the Republic of South Ossetia and served as its first commander.

== Early life ==
Dzhioev was born in Tskhinvali. After serving in the Soviet Army, he lived in Taganrog before returning to South Ossetia in 1989 as the conflict began.

== Military career ==
Dzhioev emerged as one of the most prominent field commanders of the South Ossetian self-defense forces in the early 1990s. According to South Ossetian sources, he organized and trained a unit that grew to nearly 2,500 fighters, which later formed the core of the republic's armed forces.

In November 1992, during the Ossetian-Ingush conflict, Dzhioev led a volunteer detachment from South Ossetia into the Prigorodny District of North Ossetia. South Ossetian accounts state that his unit entered the area among the first and, within less than a day, pushed Ingush formations out of the villages of Kartsa and Sunzha. A participant account describes Dzhioev ordering his men to conduct the clearance on foot rather than with heavy vehicles, a decision credited with avoiding further casualties.

In the summer of 1993, Dzhioev commanded a contingent of approximately 250 South Ossetian volunteers in Abkhazia during the War in Abkhazia (1992–1993). South Ossetian sources claim that the unit participated in operations near Sukhumi, Shroma, and Akhalsheni, and that all of its members returned without casualties. The same sources state that his detachment later became a reconnaissance battalion attached to the peacekeeping forces, and that he was involved in forming the Ossetian peacekeeping battalion stationed at Mziugom.

Dzhioev is also credited by South Ossetian sources with securing heavy weapons for the self-defense forces, including BMPs and self-propelled guns, at a time when the militias were largely armed with hunting rifles. He was named "Person of the Year" by the newspaper Yuzhnaya Osetiya in 1992.

== Death and legacy ==
Dzhioev died on 14 November 1993 in an assassination. In 2021, he was posthumously awarded the Order of Uatsamonga, South Ossetia's highest state decoration. A central street in Tskhinvali is named after him, and the Ministry of Defense of South Ossetia established a medal in his honor in 2020.
