= 1990 South Ossetian Supreme Soviet election =

- 9 December 1990
- All seats in the Supreme Soviet

Supreme Soviet elections were held in the South Ossetia on 9 December 1990. The disputed elections took place after the declaration of independence by the South Ossetian Autonomous Oblast from Georgia. In response, Georgia declared martial law. The crisis culminated in the start of the South Ossetian War.

== Background ==
During the collapse of the Soviet Union, the tensions began to grow in the Georgia's South Ossetian Autonomous Oblast between local Georgians and Ossetians as Georgians pushed for independence from the Soviet Union, while Ossetians wanted to remain within the renewed federation. The South Ossetian Popular Front (Ademon Nykhas) was created in 1988, a first Ossetian nationalist organization in the region which called for separation from Georgia. On 10 November 1989, the local South Ossetian authorities made a decision to transform South Ossetia into an "autonomous republic". They petitioned the Supreme Soviet of the Soviet Union to change the area's status from an Autonomous Oblast into an Autonomous Soviet Socialist Republic, which would be independent from the Georgian SSR. This decision was revoked by the Georgian Supreme Soviet. However, the separatists received the backing of the Soviet authorities. This resulted in a lengthy legal battle between Russian officials in Moscow and Georgian officials in Tbilisi known as the War of Laws. Ultimately, no progress on the issue was made.

On 20 September 1990 the Supreme Soviet of South Ossetia declared the Oblast's independence from Georgia as the "South Ossetian Soviet Democratic Republic", a constituent of the Soviet Union. The following day, the Georgian parliament declared that the declaration of independence was illegal. The newly "independent" South Ossetia scheduled elections to its Supreme Soviet which were held on 9 December 1990.

== Results ==
The elections took place at the same time as the 1990 Georgian Supreme Soviet election, resulting in conflicting zones of control and election participation. Voter turnout was reported to be 72%, which exceeded the Ossetian population of South Ossetia.

The members of the Supreme Soviet were members of the Communist Party of Georgia (CPG), since the CPG only declared its independence from the Communist Party of the Soviet Union on 8 December 1990, South Ossetian members of the party never attended its secession meeting, and remained loyal to the party in Moscow. In 1993 the communists would become the Communist Party of South Ossetia. However, more stringent Ossetian Nationalists were elected to the Soviet as independents.

== Aftermath ==
The situation in the region became increasingly chaotic in December 1990 and eventually led to the South Ossetia war. Towards the end of 1990, the situation for ethnic Georgians in Tskhinvali worsened sharply. There were reports of multiple cases of lootings and beatings committed both by Georgian and Ossetian paramilitaries. On 12 December 1990, gunmen driving a car in Tskhinvali opened fire from a submachine gun, killing three Georgians and wounding two in what has been described as a terrorist attack and an act of ethnic violence. Following this, Georgia declared a state of emergency in South Ossetia. The units of the Georgian MVD and the KGB entered the region to enforce the state of emergency. The commander of the Georgian Interior Ministry troops was appointed as mayor of Tskhinvali.

TASS reported on 28 December that some 2,000 people had stormed police headquarters in the South Ossetian capital, Tskhinvali, on 27 December and taken a group of Georgian policemen hostage. The hostages were released only after police set free a local man arrested for illegal possession of a firearm. By 1 January 1991, Ossetians had built barricades in Tskhinvali with concrete slabs, sandbags and trolley buses.

In the first days of January 1991, several Georgian militiamen were assassinated in Tskhinvali. On the night of 5 to 6 January 1991, the additional Georgian MVD units and the Georgian National Guard entered the city.
