= Administration of South Ossetia =

Georgian provisional government of South Ossetia

Administration of South Ossetia სამხრეთი ოსეთის ადმინისტრაცია (Georgian) Хуссар Ирыстоны администраци (Iron Ossetic)
- Provisional Government (2007—2008); Exiled Provisional Government (2008—2026)
- Flag Emblem

- Map of South Ossetia in Georgia following the South Ossetia war (1991–1992). The Administration of South Ossetia operated in the Georgian-controlled areas of the region from 2007 to 2008.
- Country: Georgia
- Mkhares: Racha-Lechkhumi and Kvemo Svaneti; Shida Kartli; Mtskheta-Mtianeti; Imereti
- Established: April 2007
- Russian Invasion: August 2008
- Abolished: January 6, 2026
- Capital: Kurta (2007–2008); Tbilisi (from 2008, in exile) ^{a}
- Official languages: Georgian; Ossetian
- Recognised regional languages: Russian
- Government: Provisional Government
- Currency: Georgian lari (GEL)
- Time zone: UTC+4 (GET)
- Website: http://soa.gov.ge
- a. Initially, the administration was based in Kurta and was administering the settlements and territory outside the separatists’ control. This territory was lost as a result of the 2008 South Ossetia War and thus the administration went into exile. b. The administration was set up by the Georgian government as a temporary measure before the settlement of South Ossetia's status.

The Administration of South Ossetia (Georgian: სამხრეთი ოსეთის ადმინისტრაცია, romanized: Samxreti Osetis administʼracia; Iron Ossetic: Хуссар Ирыстоны администраци, romanized: Xussar Irystony Administraci), officially the Administration of the Temporary Administrative-Territorial Unit on the Territory of the Former Autonomous Region of South Ossetia, was a provisional government that Georgia regarded as the legal government of South Ossetia. The administration was set up by the Georgian government as a transitional measure leading to the settlement of South Ossetia's status. The area lies within the territory of the former South Ossetian Autonomous Oblast which was abolished by the Georgian government in 1990. Since then, South Ossetia has had no formal autonomous status within Georgia. Following the 2008 South Ossetia war, the Provisional Administration had no South Ossetian territory under its control and remained a nominal entity until it was abolished on 31 December 2025 and liquidated on 9 February 2026.

== History ==
The Salvation Union of South Ossetia was founded in October 2006 by the South Ossetians who were outspoken critics and presented a serious opposition to secessionist authorities of Eduard Kokoity..

The group led by Dmitri Sanakoev, the former defence minister and then prime minister of the secessionist South Ossetian government, reached an agreement with the Georgian government to switch sides in return for steering the region towards reunification with Georgia. On November 12, 2006, an "alternative presidential election" was held in areas of the South Ossetia region under Georgian government control, parallel to the election organized by the secessionist authorities in Tskhinvali.

High voter turnout was reported by the alternative electoral commission, which estimated over 42,000 voters from both Ossetian (Java district and Tskhinvali) and Georgian (Eredvi, Tamarasheni, etc.) communities of South Ossetia and Sanakoev reportedly received 96% of the votes. Shortly afterward, another referendum was held, in which 94% of voters supported opening negotiations with Georgia on a federal arrangement for South Ossetia.

"I, the President of the Republic of South Ossetia, declare before God and Nation that I will protect the interests of the South Ossetian people... I will take care of the security, well-being and revival of South Ossetia and its people,"

Dimitri Sanakoev said in his presidential oath, which he gave in the Ossetian and Georgian languages during the inauguration ceremony held on December 1, 2006.

Soon after Sanakoev formed his government, appointing Uruzmag Karkusov as Prime Minister, Jemal Karkusov (former Interior Minister in the secessionist government) as Interior Minister and Maia Chigoeva-Tsaboshvili (head of the Tbilisi-based non-governmental organization Iber-Ironi Georgian-Ossetian Union) as Foreign Minister.

“This is a historic day. A year ago no one could imagine that South Ossetian flags could appear here in the Georgian-populated village,” Vladimir Sanakoev, co-founder of the Salvation Union of South Ossetia, said.

There were large number of Ossetian flags also used by the South Ossetian secessionist authorities, flown alongside the Georgian flag in Kurta, near Tskhinvali. South Ossetian flags are usually displayed in Tskhinvali by the separatist controlled territories of the breakaway region alongside of the Russian national flag.

Initially the entity of Sanakoev was known as "the Alternative Government of South Ossetia", but during the course of 2007 the central authorities of Georgia decided to give it official status and on April 13 the formation of "Provisional Administration of South Ossetia" was announced. On May 10, 2007, Dmitry Sanakoev was appointed head of the provisional administration in South Ossetia.

For the first time since the fall of Soviet Union, the former Ossetian secessionist leader gave a speech in the Georgian parliament on May 11, 2007.

In his speech in Ossetian language (full text), Sanakoev spoke about the armed conflict which ignited the region in early 90s:

"Many of [Ossetians] took arms [in early 90s] and I was among them. But we all have understood that armed confrontation brought nothing but misfortune… It became clear for us that we were in impasse."

He also talked about "vicious Soviet legacy, grave mistakes committed by the both sides and the imperialistic policy of divide and rule exerted by the external forces." Sanakoev also mentioned that despite his high-level position in the South Ossetian secessionist authorities as Prime Minister he failed to build confidence between the two sides and make a breakthrough in the conflict resolution process “because it was beyond my powers.”

"There is only one solution – direct dialogue between the Georgian and Ossetian people, neutralizing external and internal destructive forces and their replacement with effective and healthy support of the international democratic community. European Union's role in respect of confidence-building and economic rehabilitation is of vital importance. We should counter-balance antidemocratic propaganda by our movement’s brave peaceful initiatives and economic development projects."

As for current situation, Sanakoev mentioned that Tskhinvali secessionist authorities took instruction from "foreign supervisors" who were trying to thwart confidence-building and provoke hostilities between the two people.

Many European and US observers and ambassadors who were present during Sanakoev's speech, welcomed his proposition and initiatives. On June 15, 2007, European Union, European Parliament and OSCE supported Georgian initiative for conflict settlement in South Ossetia. EU issued the following statement:

"The EU welcomes the Georgian government's invitation to the South Ossetian society as a whole – i.e. representatives of all political forces and local groups – to participate actively in discussions on progress towards peaceful conflict resolution."

The EU mission had met with both Sanakoev and Kokoity in January, 2007. Per Eklund, Head of the European Commission Delegation to Georgia said that "None of the two alternatives do we consider legitimate [in South Ossetia],"

On July 13, 2007, Georgia set up a state commission, chaired by the Prime Minister Zurab Noghaideli, to develop South Ossetia's autonomous status within the Georgian state. According to the Georgian officials, the status would be elaborated within the framework of "an all-inclusive dialogue" with all the forces and communities within the Ossetian society.

The administration's functions included conducting negotiations with the Georgian authorities on behalf of local political forces and society, with the aim of determining an autonomous status for the former South Ossetian Autonomous Oblast within the Georgian state and granting it broad political self-government. Its other responsibilities included ensuring legality and law and order within the provisional administrative-territorial unit; protecting the rights of residents and ethnic groups living in the territory; facilitating the rehabilitation of local infrastructure; developing and implementing socioeconomic projects; and protecting the Georgian and Ossetian languages, traditions, and cultural heritage, among other duties.

It was decided that the administration would be funded from the Georgian state budget. The Georgian central government called for the provisional administration to be included in the negotiation process. The creation of the administration was seen as the Georgian government's main attempt to challenge the decade-long status quo in the conflict zone. Initially, the administration was quite active, which seriously irritated the separatist regime. The establishment of the provisional administration was followed by the expansion of a public movement called "Go in Peace, Kokoity" (Georgian: გზა მშვიდობისა კოკოითის) throughout Georgia.

=== 2008 Russo-Georgian War ===
On August 8, 2008, the same day that the 2008 Olympic Games officially began, the Russo-Georgian War broke out, during which Russian forces drove Georgian forces out of Georgian-controlled areas of South Ossetia. Following the end of hostilities, the Russian parliament voted in favour of recognizing South Ossetia's separatist government. This unilateral recognition by Russia was met by condemnation from some members of the United Nations (including France, Germany, the United Kingdom and the United States) and from NATO, the Organization for Security and Co-operation in Europe and the European Council, due to the violation of Georgia's territorial integrity, of numerous United Nations resolutions on Abkhazia and of international law.

=== After the war ===
The Provisional Administration continued its work in villages with partially Ossetian population outside the borders of South Ossetia proper. Its official channel featured celebrations marking the anniversary of Ossetian poet Kosta Khetagurov's birth, as well as Ossetian-language lessons at a village school.

Dmitry Sanakoyev headed the administration until November 2022, when he was replaced by Tamaz Bestayev.

=== Abolition ===
On 17 November 2025 Georgia’s ruling party announced to abolish the provisional Administration of South Ossetia on 1 January 2026. On December 17, Georgia's parliament adopted the required legislation in a unanimous 83-0 vote, which took effect on January 1, 2026. The abolition would not affect parallel municipal administrations in-exile of Akhalgori, Kurta, Tighva, and Eredvi. On December 26, 2025, the Government issued Decree No. 2244 which formed a liquidation commission for the Administration and on February 9, 2026, issued Decree No. 316 setting out the detailed procedure for paying compensation to the dismissed employees of the Administration. On February 13, 2026 the government reported that 564,625 Georgian lari would be required to cover the expenses associated with the liquidation which re-directed the funds going to the Administration to the Gori, Kaspi, Kareli, and Khashuri districts.

== Office holders ==
=== Head ===
| No. | Name | Portrait | Term start | Term end |
|---|---|---|---|---|
| 1 | Dmitry Sanakoyev | | 10 May 2007 | 4 November 2022 |
| 2 | Tamaz Bestayev | | 4 November 2022 | 9 February 2026 |

== See also ==
- South Ossetian Autonomous Oblast
- Government of the Autonomous Republic of Abkhazia
- Autonomous Republic of Adjara
