= JPKF =

- Joint peacekeeping force (Georgian–Ossetian conflict)
- Joseph P. Kennedy Jr. Foundation
