= Tamaz Bestaev =

South Ossetian and Georgian politician

- თამაზ ბესტაევი
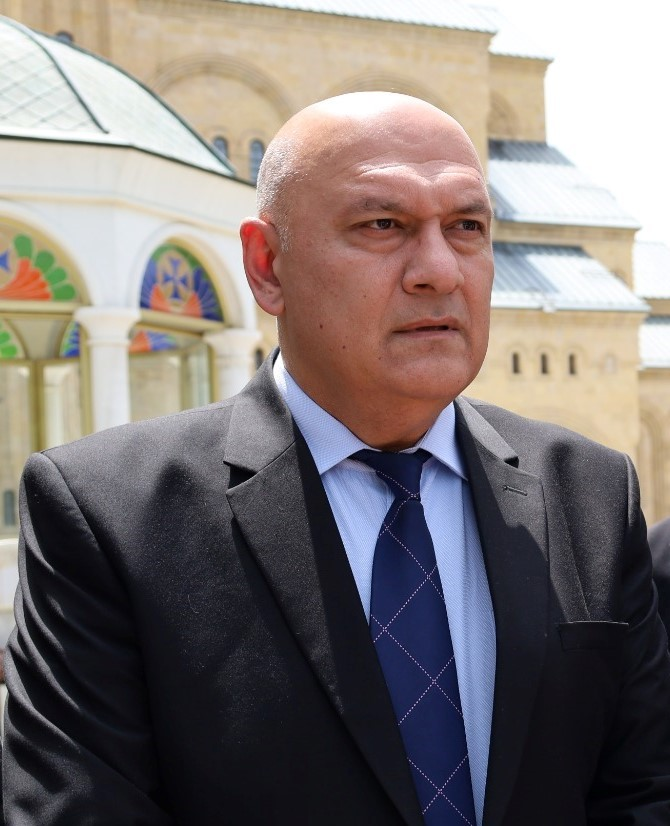

Head of the Administration of South Ossetia
- In office 4 November 2022 – 31 December 2025
- Preceded by: Dmitry Sanakoyev

Personal details
- Born: June 20, 1970 (age 56) Signagi, Georgian SSR, Soviet Union
- Education: Tbilisi State Medical University - Faculty of Medicine
- Occupation: Politician

Tamaz Bestaev (born 20 June 1970 in Signagi, Georgian SSR) is a Georgian-South Ossetian politician, of whom, since 4 November 2022, had served as the Head of the Provisional Administration of South Ossetia, a rival entity established in Georgian territory covering the former South Ossetian Autonomous Oblast by the Georgian government, until 2026 when it was dissolved.

== History ==
=== Pre-politician period ===
From 1990 to 1996, Bestaev studied at the Tbilisi State Medical University, specifically in the Faculty of Medicine. From 2000 to 2006, he worked at Tbilisi National Center for Tuberculosis and Lung Diseases as a urologist.

=== In the Health and Social Security Service of the Provisional Administration ===
From 2007 to 2009, he was the Minister of the Health and Social Security Service of the Administration of South Ossetia. In 2009, he became the Director of the Department of Health and Social Security, and in 2012, he became the Head of the Health and Social Security Service of the Administration of South Ossetia. In 2017, he became embroiled in a dispute with the President of South Ossetia, Anatoly Bibilov whom had been advising South Ossetians not to go into Georgia for medical treatment on the grounds that the Georgian Intelligence Service were allegedly forcing them to accept Georgian citizenship. Bestaev responded stating that most entered via the Larsi checkpoint under Red Cross programmes and stated that South Ossetians were coming because he believed Georgia had a higher standard for medical treatment.

=== As the Head the Administration of South Ossetia ===
On 4 November 2022, Tamaz Bestaev was appointed as the Head of the Administration of South Ossetia, replacing Dmitry Sanakoev. Bestaev remained in that role until 2026 when the Georgian Dream government passed a law to dissolve the Administration of South Ossetia.
