= 1996 South Ossetian presidential election =

- 10 November 1996
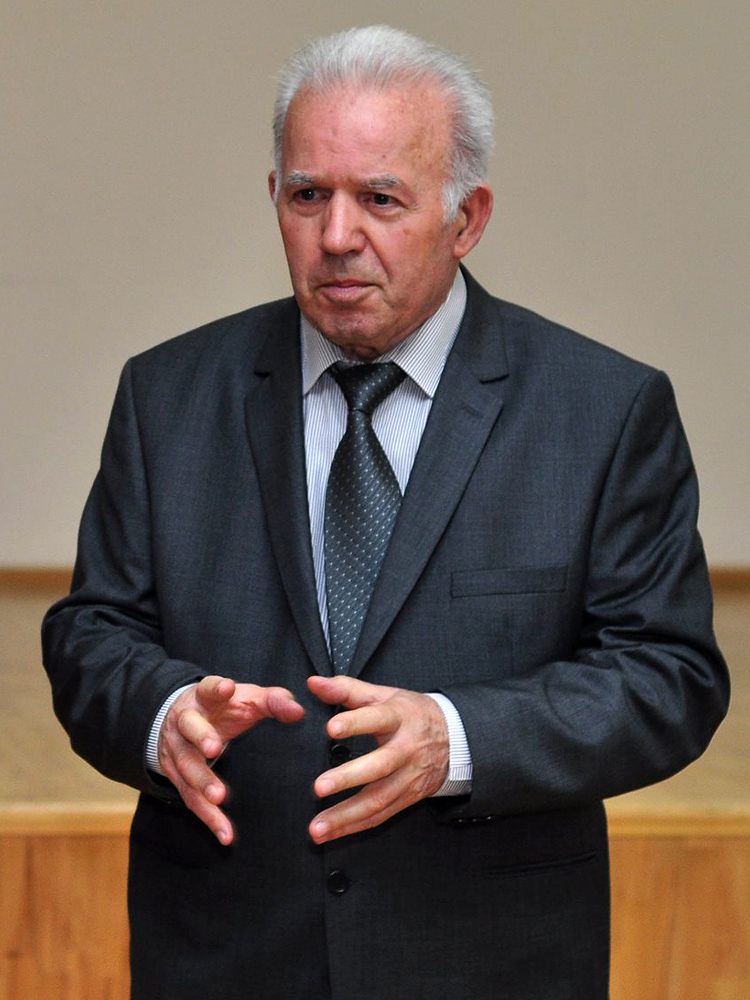

Nominee	Lyudvig Chibirov	Gerasim Khugayev
Party	Independent	Independent
Percentage	52.3%	23.9%
President before election
Position established
Elected President
Lyudvig Chibirov
Independent

Presidential elections were held in South Ossetia on 10 November 1996. The result was a victory for the incumbent head of state Lyudvig Chibirov, who received 52% of the vote.

== Background ==
This was the first election in the region since the 1990 Georgian Supreme Soviet election before the collapse of the USSR and Georgian independence. Since prior to the region's breakaway in 1991, the head of state's title had been 'Chairman of the Presidium of the South Ossetian Supreme Council', a role equivalent to Speaker, and there had been three officeholders since the declaration of independence: Torez Kulumbegov from 1990 to his imprisonment in 1991, then Znaur Gassiev who held the role during Torez's imprisonment in 1991–1992, before Torez returned to the position in 1992; he was succeeded in 1993 by Lyudvig Chibirov, who held office until 1996 when the Parliament of South Ossetia issued a series of amendments to the constitution which created a new presidential form of government.

== Results ==
Chibirov was elected with 52% of the vote, meaning no runoff was required. Gerasim Khugayev finished second with 24% while three other candidates collectively received 24% of the vote.

Candidate	Votes	%
Lyudvig Chibirov		52.3
Gerasim Khugayev		23.9
Three other candidates		23.8
Total		
Registered voters/turnout		61.3
Source: Jeffries

== Reactions ==
Georgian President Eduard Shevardnadze stated that the elections "cannot be considered legitimate", but said that the peace process "should go ahead".
