= Order of Courage =

Order of Courage may refer to:

- Order of Courage (Abkhazia), a state decoration of Abkhazia
- Order of Courage (Iran), a state decoration of Iran
- Order of Courage (Russia), a state decoration of Russia

== See also ==
- Order for Courage, a state decoration of Ukraine
