= People of South Ossetia for Peace =

Former political party in South Ossetia

The People of South Ossetia for Peace (Iron Ossetic: Цӕгат райгуырынц Хуссар Ирыстон; Georgian: სამხრეთ ოსეთის ხალხი მშვიდობისთვის, romanized: samkhret osetis khalkhi mshvidobistvis) movement was the opposition party and political movement in South Ossetia which was formed by the ethnic Ossetians who had been formerly members of the secessionist government in Tskhinvali and outspoken critics of de facto separatist regime in Tskhinvali, headed at that time by Eduard Kokoity.

== Members ==
The organization was co-founded by Dmitri Sanakoev, former defence minister and then prime minister of breakaway South Ossetia for several months in 2001 when the region was run by de facto President Lyudvig Chibirov. Along with the other former members of the secessionist government, Sanakoev formed an opposition movement to Kokoity and his separatist agenda. The organization was officially founded on October 24, 2006 by Dmitri Sanakoev, Maia Chigoeva-Tsaboshvili (head of the Tbilisi-based non-governmental organization Iber-Ironi Georgian-Ossetian Union), Giogi Chigoev, Teimuraz Jeragoev, Jemal Karkusov (former Interior Minister in the secessionist government), Vladimir Sanakoev and Uruzmag Karkusov. Dmitri Sanakoev served as the spokesperson of the group.

== Goals ==
The main aim of the organization was to put an end to Kokoity regime in Tskhinvali which maintains its pro-Russian and separatist stance. Soon after the secessionist authorities declared they would hold elections together with a referendum on November 12, 2006. The People of South Ossetia for Peace decided to conduct alternative elections where Georgians and Ossetians alike could participate as equal voters (unlike secessionist elections which did not include the Georgian population of South Ossetia).

== History ==
After the November 12 vote, the "alternative polls" informed that ex-South Ossetian prime minister Dimitri Sanakoev was elected as an alternative "President" of the region, and the alternative referendum resulted in a yes to launch talks with Tbilisi on creating a unified federal state with Georgia.

"I have voted for peace and we expect Georgians and Ossetians to build a new state," Sanakoev said after casting his ballot in Akhalgori, a district in South Ossetia that is controlled by the Georgian authorities.

The Inauguration of Sanakoev as alternative President of South Ossetia took place on December 1, 2006, in the village of Kurta, a few kilometres north-east of Tskhinvali. Soon after inauguration, Sanakoev formed his government appointing Uruzmag Karkusov as Prime Minister, Jemal Karkusov as Interior Minister and Maia Chigoeva-Tsaboshvili as Foreign Minister.

The secessionist regime in Tskhinvali has outlawed the organization. Several attacks on the houses of its members have also been reported.

Officially, the Government of Georgia does not recognize either authority, but has expressed the desire to cooperate with Sanakoev's administration regarding the future of the region.
