= Boris Grigolashvili =

Georgian military leader, Major general Boris Arkadievich Grigolashvili
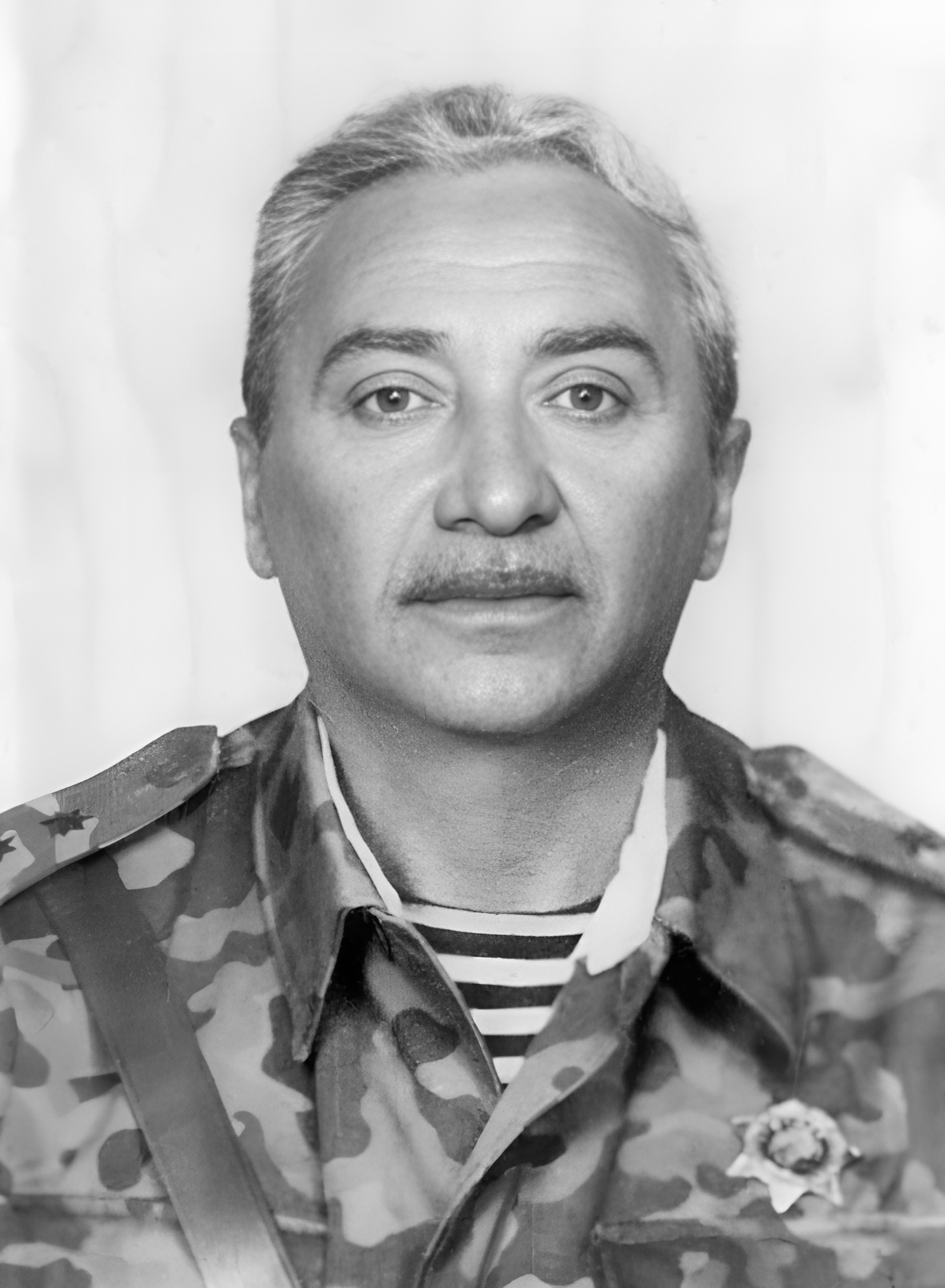
- Boris Grigolashvili – while serving in the Georgian Armed forces in 1992
- Born: 26 October 1933; Tbilisi, Georgian SSR, USSR
- Died: 29 October 1993 (aged 60) Kutaisi, Georgia
- Buried: Tbilisi, Georgia
- Allegiance: Soviet Union; Georgian SSR; Georgia
- Branch: Army
- Service years: Soviet Army (1953–1989); Georgian Army (1992–1993)
- Rank: Colonel (USSR) (1980); Major general (Georgia) (1993)
- Commands: Chief of operations department (G-3) – first deputy chief of staff of the Main Directorate of the National Guard of Georgia (February 1992 – June 1993) chief of staff – first deputy commander of the 1st Army Corps of the Ministry of Defense of Georgia (July – October 1993)
- Conflicts: South Ossetia War; War in Abkhazia
- Awards: 3 orders and 14 medals of the USSR Order of Vakhtang Gorgasali I class (1993)

Boris Arkadievich Grigolashvili (Georgian: ბორის არკადის ძე გრიგოლაშვილი, October 26, 1933, Tbilisi – 29 October 1993, Kutaisi, buried in Tbilisi) was a Georgian military leader, major general (1993).

Graduated from the Tbilisi military school (1956). He served in the Armed Forces of the Soviet Union (1953–1989), held the rank of colonel (1980), and was awarded 3 orders and 14 medals of the USSR.

In the Georgian Armed Forces since February 1992: chief of operations department (G-3) – first deputy chief of staff of the Main Directorate of the National Guard of Georgia, since July 1993 – chief of staff – first deputy commander of the 1st army corps of the Ministry of Defense of Georgia.

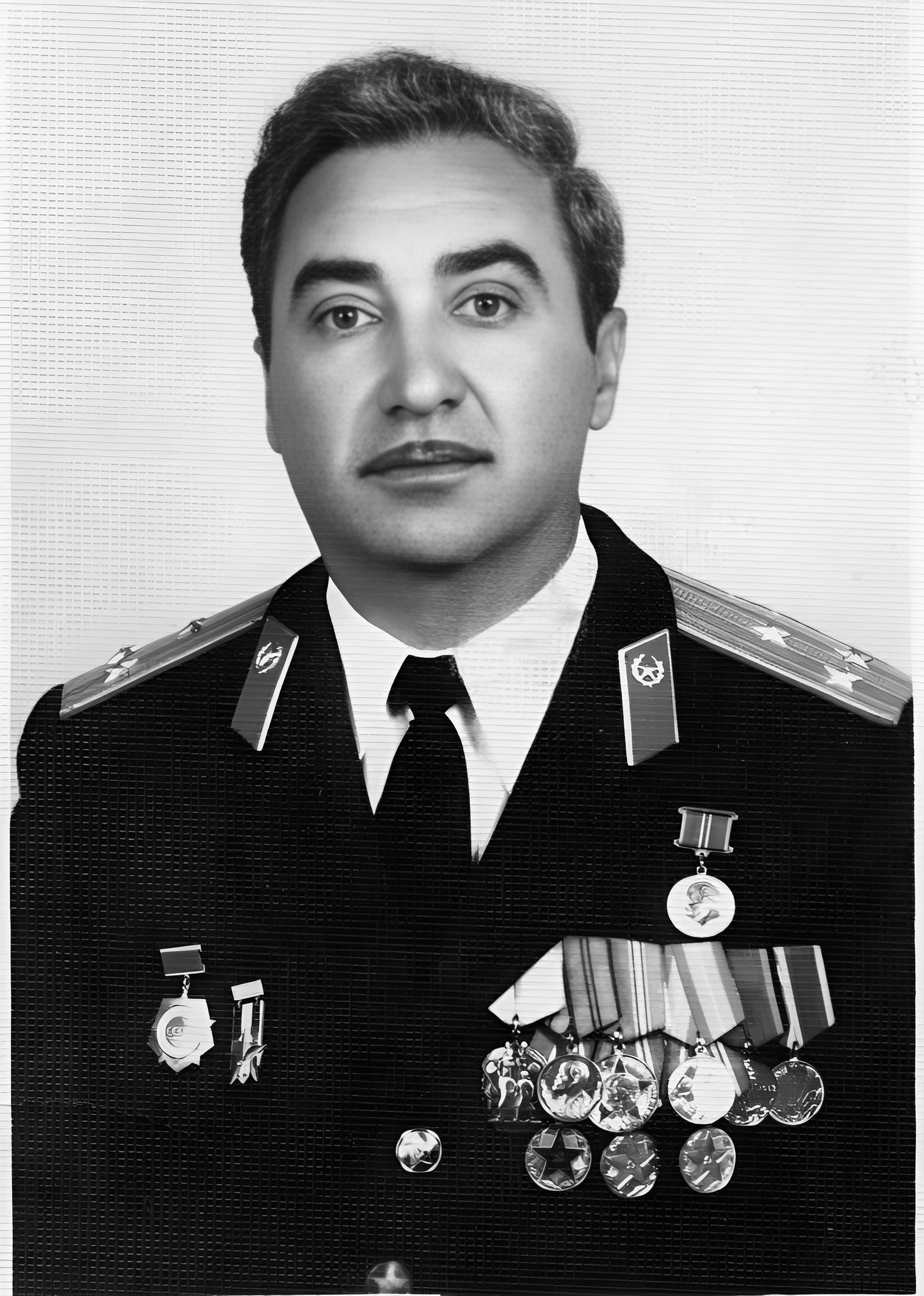
Boris Grigolashvili – while serving in the armed forces of the USSR in 1983

In 1992-1993 B. Grigolashvili took part in military operations in Abkhazia and Samachablo (Tskhinvali region). Many military operations were planned and successfully carried out under his leadership. He was mortally wounded and died in the fighting in the Abkhazian war. For outstanding contribution to the benefit of the homeland and the nation, fortitude and self-sacrifice, courage and heroism demonstrated in the struggle to defend the homeland and its territorial integrity, for skillful leadership, implementation of defense measures, development and conduct of military operations, Major General Boris Grigolashvili was posthumously awarded the Order of Vakhtang Gorgasali, 1st degree, by Decree of the Head of State of Georgia No. 229 of November 5, 1993.

In 2025, a new street in the Samgori district of Tbilisi was named after Boris Grigolashvili.

== Literature ==
- ენციკლოპედია „საქართველო“/ Encyclopedia "Georgia", vol. 2, p. 150, Tbilisi, 2012. http://georgianencyclopedia.ge/index.php?title=მთავარი_გვერდი
- ლევან დოლიძე "გენერალსიმუსი, მარშლები, გენერლები, ადმირალები – ჩვენი თანამემამულენი1700-2000" / Dolidze L. "Generalissimo, marshals, generals, admirals – our compatriots 1700-2000", pp. 111, 176, Tbilisi, Sezani, 2000. https://dspace.nplg.gov.ge/handle/1234/244300
- ლევან დოლიძე "გენერლები საქართველოდან"/ Dolidze L. "Generals from Georgia: Three-century chronicle of the Georgian generals", pp. 441, 659, Tbilisi, 2003. https://dspace.nplg.gov.ge/handle/1234/114120
- ბორის გრიგოლაშვილი — საქართველოს ბიოგრაფიული ლექსიკონი / Boris Grigolashvili – Georgian Biographical Dictionary. http://www.nplg.gov.ge/bios/ka/00002839/
- წიგნი ღირსებისა: ტ. 1/ შემდგ.: თამაზ ყიფიანი (რედ.), თენგიზ გაჩეჩილაძე, გურამ სიმონიშვილი.- თბ., 2000. - გვ.121 / Book of Dignity: v. 1/ compiled by: Tamaz Kipiani (ed.), Tengiz Gachechiladze, Guram Simonishvili. – Tbilisi, 2000. – p. 121 https://mematiane.ge/product-details.php?id=9495&&lang=ru
- ბორის გრიგოლაშვილი — მემატიანე / Boris Grigolashvili - The Chronicler https://mematiane.ge/product-details.php?id=2211
- საქართველოს საკანონმდებლო მაცნე: ქალაქ თბილისის მუნიციპალიტეტის საკრებულოს 2025 წლის 25 ივლისის № 366 განკარგულება "ქალაქ თბილისში, სამგორის რაიონში, კალოუბნის ქუჩასთან მდებარე უსახელო ქუჩისთვის გენერალ-მაიორის ბორის გრიგოლაშვილის სახელის მინიჭების შესახებ" / Legislative Herald of Georgia: Order of the Tbilisi City Assembly No. 366 of July 25, 2025 "On naming an unnamed street located near Kaloubani Street in the Samgori district of Tbilisi after Major General Boris Grigolashvili" https://www.matsne.gov.ge/ka/document/view/6590104?publication=0.
