= Kurta (village) =

Abandoned village in South Ossetia

Coordinates: 42°17′20″N 43°57′3″E

Kurta Georgian: ქურთა Iron Ossetic: Курта
- Ghost Town Village
- Interactive map of Kurta
- Country: South Ossetia (de facto); Georgia (de jure)

Population
  - Total: 0
- Time zone: UTC+4 (Georgian Time)
- a. The town is still internationally recognized as a part of Georgia.

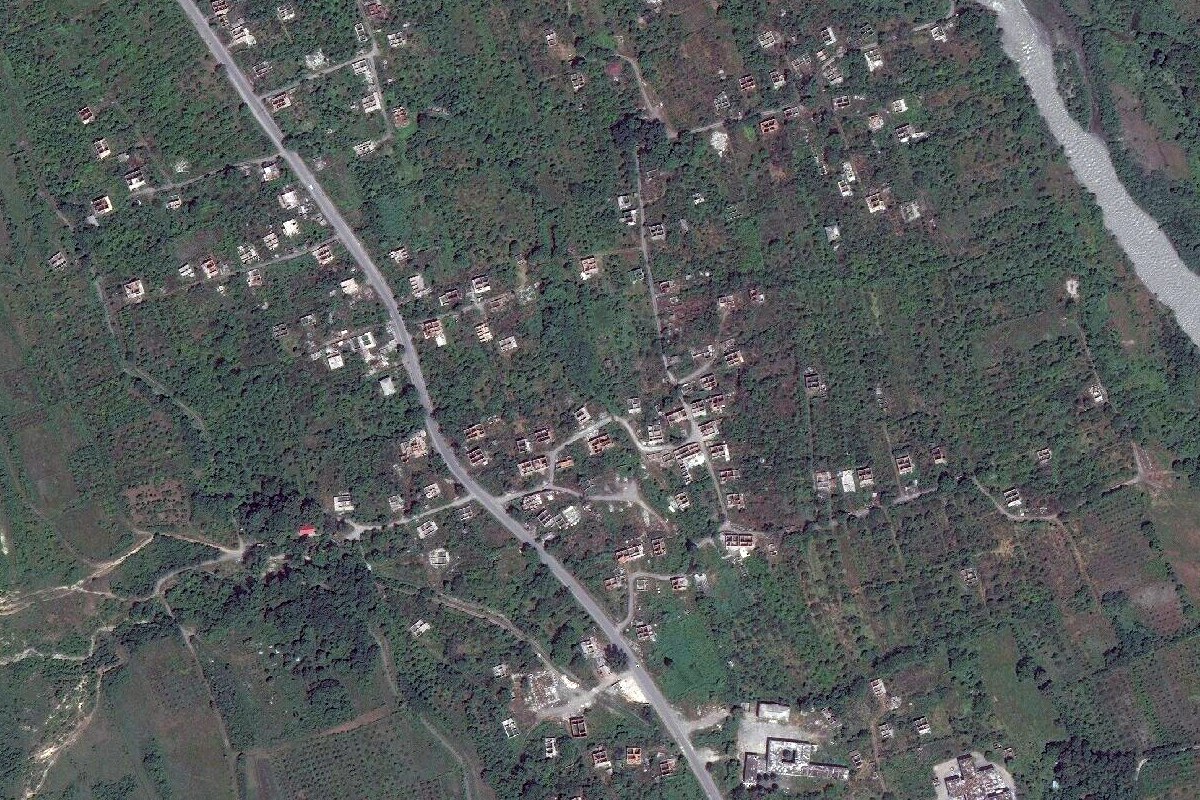

Kurta (Georgian: ქურთა; Iron Ossetic: Курта) is an abandoned village in the former South Ossetian autonomous oblast of Georgia. Populated largely by ethnic Georgians, it was one of the towns that remained under the control of Georgia between the unilateral secession of South Ossetia after the 1991–1992 South Ossetia War and the 2008 South Ossetia War.

Kurta is situated nine kilometers north-east of Tskhinvali, the secessionist-controlled capital of South Ossetia, on the right bank of the Greater Liakhvi River, and is strategically placed along the Trans-Caucasus Highway (TransCam) between Tskhinvali and Java. After the Parliament of Georgia passed a resolution on the establishment of the Temporary Territorial Unit on April 11, 2007, Kurta became the headquarters of the Provisional Administration of South Ossetia headed by the ethnic Ossetian Dmitry Sanakoyev. The Georgian government also allocated 1,850,000 lari to rehabilitation of the village's infrastructure.

Kurta and its environs are part of the Greater Liakhvi Valley Museum-Reserve. The village itself houses a late medieval Georgian Orthodox church of St. George.

On the eve of the 2008 Russian invasion of Georgia, all the Georgian inhabitants were evacuated to un-occupied Georgian territory and most of their abandoned homes were destroyed later. The homes were not rebuilt and the population did not return, leaving the largely destroyed village a ghost town.
