= North Ossetian Regional Committee of the Communist Party of the Soviet Union =

The First Secretary of the North Ossetian regional branch of the Communist Party of the Soviet Union was the position of highest authority in the North Ossetian AO (1924–1936) and the North Ossetian ASSR (1936–1991) in the Russian SFSR of the Soviet Union. The position was created in November 1924, and abolished in August 1991. The First Secretary was a de facto appointed position usually by the Politburo or the General Secretary himself.

== List of First Secretaries of the Communist Party of North Ossetia ==
Name	Term of Office		Life years
Name	Start	End	Life years
First Secretaries of the Communist Party
Simon Takoyev	November 1924	1927	1876–1937
Kazbek Borukayev	1927	June 1928	1890–1931
Mikhail Pitkovsky	June 1928	1930	1897–1938
Moris Belotsky	1930	September 1931	1895–1944
David Demikhovsky	1931	September 9, 1934	1899–1938
Kazbek Butayev	September 9, 1934	February 1936	1893–1938
Genrikh Maurer	February 1936	July 21, 1937	1893–1938
Fyodor Kokov	July 21, 1937	November 1937	1900–1939
Vasily Lemayev (Note: Acting)	November 1937	1938	1902–?
Nikita Ivanov	1938	January 1940	1908–1977
Nikolay Mazin	January 1940	March 1944	1909–?
Kubady Kulov	March 1944	November 1953	1907–?
Vladimir Agkatsev	November 1953	August 5, 1961	1911–
Bilar Kabaloyev	August 5, 1961	January 15, 1982	1917–2009
Vladimir Odintsov	January 15, 1982	November 26, 1988	1924–2009
Aleksandr Dzasokhov	November 26, 1988	February 24, 1990	1934–
Akhsarbek Galazov	February 24, 1990	August 1991	1929–2013

== See also ==
- North Ossetian Autonomous Oblast
- North Ossetian Autonomous Soviet Socialist Republic
- South Ossetian Regional Committee of the Communist Party of the Soviet Union

== Sources ==
- World Statesmen.org
