= Merab Chigoyev =

South Ossetian politician

- Цгъойты Мераб (Iron Ossetic); Мераб Чигоев (Russian)

Prime Minister of South Ossetia
- In office August 1998 – June 2001
- President: Lyudvig Chibirov
- Preceded by: Aleksandr Shavlokhov
- Succeeded by: Dmitry Sanakoyev

Minister of Justice
- In office 5 July 2005 – 18 August 2008
- President: Eduard Kokoity

Personal details
- Born: 15 February 1951 Leningor District, Georgian SSR, Soviet Union
- Died: 9 January 2016 (aged 65) Tskhinvali, South Ossetia
- Party: Communist Party of South Ossetia

Merab Ilyich Chigoev (Russian: Мераб Ильич Чигоев; Iron Ossetic: Цгъойты Ильяйы фырт Мераб, romanized: Chojty Iljajy fyrt Merab; Georgian: მერაბ ილიას ძე ჩიგოევი; 15 February 1950 – 9 January 2016) was a Georgian South Ossetian politician and former Prime Minister, from August 1998 until June 2001. He was also Minister of Justice in Yury Morozov's cabinet.

Chigoev graduated from the Lomonosov Moscow State University in 1973.

In the 2009 parliamentary election, Chigoev was a candidate for the Communist Party of South Ossetia. Chigoev was number 8 on the list, and as the party received enough votes for 8 seats, Chigoev was entitled to a seat in the Parliament of South Ossetia.

Chigoev was killed in a traffic accident in Tskhinvali on 9 January 2016. At the time of his death Chigoev was on the committee that was drafting the new Constitution of South Ossetia.

Political offices
Preceded by Aleksandr Shavlokhov	Prime Minister of South Ossetia; 1998–2001	Succeeded by Dmitry Sanakoyev
