= Torez Kulumbegov =

South Ossetian politician

- Хъуылымбегты Торез
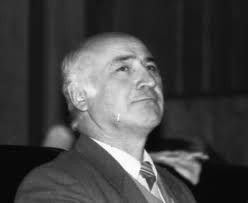

1st & 3rd President of South Ossetia
- In office September 9, 1992 – September 17, 1993
- Preceded by: Znaur Gassiev
- Succeeded by: Lyudvig Chibirov
- In office October 10, 1990 – May 4, 1991
- Preceded by: Position established
- Succeeded by: Znaur Gassiev

Personal details
- Born: September 2, 1938 Staliniri, Georgian SSR, Soviet Union
- Died: October 1, 2006 (aged 68) Moscow, Russia

Torez Georgievich Kulumbegov (Iron Ossetic: Хъуылымбегты Торез; Qwelembêgte Torêž, Georgian: ტორეზ კულუმბეგოვი, Russian: Торез Георгиевич Кулумбегов; September 2, 1938 – October 1, 2006) was a South Ossetian politician who served as the 1st and 3rd President of South Ossetia from 1990 to 1993.

== Career ==
Kulumbegov was the head of the South Ossetian State Television and Radio Broadcasting Company. He was principal of the Tskhinvali Secondary School No. 2.

During the collapse of the Soviet Union, ethnic conflict broke out between the South Ossetian Autonomous Oblast and Georgia. Kulumbegov was made head of the Soviet Supreme Council of the South Ossetia. Kulumbegov was invited for the talks with the Georgian President Zviad Gamsakhurdia, but was arrested and held prisoner by Georgian police in Tbilisi from 29 January 1991 until January 1992. While he was in prison Znaur Gassiev ruled as the 2nd chairman until his release. When he returned he was restored to his previous position, however, the title was renamed to the Chairman of the State Nyhas.

The Sochi agreement ending the South Ossetia war was signed by President of Russia Boris Yeltsin, President of Georgia Eduard Shevardnadze, Head of North Ossetia–Alania Akhsarbek Galazov, and Kulumbegov on 24 June 1992. Kulumbegov resigned as chair of the Supreme Soviet and Head of State in October 1993, and was replaced by Lyudvig Chibirov.

== Personal life ==
Kulumbegov died in Moscow, on 1 October 2006. His funeral was held in Tskhinvali on 3 October.

== Works cited ==
=== Books ===
- Burkadze, Zarina (2022). Great Power Competition and the Path to Democracy: The Case of Georgia, 1991-2020. Boydell & Brewer. ISBN 9781648250439.
- Hewitt, B. (2013). Discordant Neighbours: A Reassessment of the Georgian-Abkhazian and Georgian-South Ossetian Conflicts. Vol. 3. Brill Publishers. ISBN 9789004248922.

=== News ===
- Vaneev, Georgy (3 October 2006). Скончался бывший председатель Верховного Совета Южной Осетии Источник [The former chairman of the Supreme Council of South Ossetia has died.]. Caucasian Knot (in Russian). Archived from the original on 14 November 2026.
- Скончался Торез Георгиевич Кулумбегов [Torez Georgievich Kulumbegov has passed away.]. Ossetia Radio (in Russian). 5 October 2006. Archived from the original on 16 February 2012.

Political offices
New office	Chairman of the Supreme Council; 1990–1991	Succeeded by Znaur Gassiyev
Preceded by Znaur Gassiyev	Head of State of South Ossetia; 1992–1993	Succeeded by Lyudvig Chibirov
Preceded by Znaur Gassiyev	Chairman of the Supreme Council; 1992–1993	Succeeded by Lyudvig Chibirov
