= Aleksandr Shavlokhov =

South Ossetian politician (1940–2026)

- Александр Шавлохов

Prime Minister of South Ossetia
- In office 2 December 1996 – August 1998
- President: Lyudvig Chibirov
- Preceded by: Valery Hubulov
- Succeeded by: Merab Chigoev

Personal details
- Born: 29 April 1940 Stalinir, South Ossetian AO, Georgian SSR, Soviet Union
- Died: 21 January 2026 (aged 85) Tskhinvali, South Ossetia

Aleksandr Apollonovich Shavlokhov (Russian: Александр Аполлонович Шавлохов; 29 April 1940 – 21 January 2026) was a South Ossetian politician who served as Prime Minister from 1996 until August 1998.

== Life and career ==
Shavlokhov was born in 1940. He was educated as a mechanical engineer in Moscow. From 1965 until 1974, he worked at the "Elektrovibromashina" factory in Tskhinvali, where he was appointed director in 1973. From 1974 until 1981, he headed the executive committee of the Tskhinvali City Council.

In 1996, after Lyudvig Chibirov had been elected as South Ossetia's first president, Shavlokhov became Chibirov's prime minister. During his time as PM, foreign contacts of South Ossetia were intensified, and programs were adopted to deepen the integration of North and South Ossetia.

Shavlokhov died on 21 January 2026, at the age of 86.

Political offices
Preceded by Valery Hubulov	Prime Minister of South Ossetia; 1996–1998	Succeeded by Merab Chigoev
