= Konstantin Timerman =

- Константин Анатольевич Тимерман
- Timerman (right) and Dmitry Medvedev circa 2008
- Born: Konstantin Anatolyevich Timerman; October 11, 1977 (age 48); Novokuznetsk, Kemerovo Oblast, Russian SFSR, USSR
- Military career
- Allegiance: Russia (1994–2015)
- Branch: Russian Armed Forces (1994–2015); Wagner Group (2015-present)
- Rank: Lieutenant colonel
- Conflicts: Second Chechen War; Russo-Georgian War: Battle of Tskhinvali

Konstantin Anatolyevich Timerman (Ru: Константин Анатольевич Тимерман) is a Russian soldier who served as the acting battalion commander of the Joint Control Commission for Georgian–Ossetian Conflict Resolution (JCC-GOR) in 2008.

== Biography ==
Timerman was born on October 11, 1977, in Novokuznetsk, Kemerovo Oblast, Russian SFSR (now Russia). Intrigue arose about his familial origins after receiving the Hero of Russia in 2008; Timerman claims he has Russian and German heritage, although Russian-Israeli journalist Simon Briman reported that Timerman's ancestors are Dutch Jews.

He joined the Russian Armed Forces in 1994. Between 1999 and 2001, Timerman was a company commander in the 205th Brigade during the Second Chechen War. Between 2005 and 2007, Timerman was the commander of a tank battalion in the 70th Regiment, and later commanded a motorized rifle battalion of the 71st Regiment of the 42nd Motor Rifle Division. In December 2007, Timerman was appointed commander of the 2nd Motorized Rifle Battalion of the 135th Regiment of the 58th Guards Combined Arms Army based in the North Caucasus Military District.

=== Russo-Georgian war ===
Timerman fought in the Russo-Georgian War, commanding a regiment of the Joint Control Commission for Georgian–Ossetian Conflict Resolution (JCC-GOR), which was a peacekeeping force prior to the war. The Press Service and Information Directorate of the Russian Ministry of Defense described Timerman's actions during the battle of Tskhinvali as:

"On August 8, 2008, during an incursion by Georgian armed forces into the battalion's area of responsibility, Lieutenant Colonel Konstantin Anatolyevich Timerman skillfully and expertly organized the manning of posts, reconnaissance, and battalion command, as well as the security and defense of the base camp, in accordance with the peacekeeping mandate. Guided by the peacekeeping mandate, he attempted until the last moment to compel the Georgian side to observe the ceasefire and prevent the violation of the established borders. In response, the Georgian side opened fire with all types of weapons. Skillfully directing the actions of his subordinates in repelling an attack on the battalion's deployment point, Lieutenant Colonel Konstantin Anatolyevich Timerman demonstrated courage and heroism during the battle, personally killing six enemy personnel. Despite being wounded, he did not leave the battlefield and continued to skillfully direct the actions of his subordinates. During the first day of combat, Lieutenant Colonel K. A. Timerman's unit destroyed six tanks, four armored vehicles, and approximately 50 enemy personnel. Subsequently, after the arrival of reinforcements, Lieutenant Colonel K. A. Timerman refused hospitalization and continued to command the unit."

=== Postwar career ===
Ukrainian intelligence identified Timerman as a senior instructor for fire training in the Wagner Group since 2015. His personal number in the Wagner Group was M-1511.
