= Dmitry Sanakoyev =

South Ossetian and Georgian politician

- Дмитрий Санакоев

Defense Minister of South Ossetia
- In office 1996–2001
- President: Lyudvig Chibirov
- Preceded by: Nikolai Dzagoev

Prime Minister of South Ossetia
- In office 14 June 2001 – December 2001
- President: Lyudvig Chibirov
- Preceded by: Merab Chigoev
- Succeeded by: Gerasim Khugayev

Head of the Provisional Administration of South Ossetia
- In office 4 May 2007 – 4 November 2022
- Preceded by: Position established
- Succeeded by: Tamaz Bestaev

Personal details
- Born: 10 May 1969 (age 56) Tskhinvali, South Ossetian AO, Georgian SSR, Soviet Union
- Party: The Salvation Union of South Ossetia

Dmitry Ivanovich Sanakoyev (Russian: Дмитрий Иванович Санакоев; born 10 May 1969) is a South Ossetian and Georgian politician, a former official in the secessionist government of South Ossetia and later, from 2007 to 2022, served as the Head of the Provisional Administration of South Ossetia, a rival entity established in the Georgian-controlled territories in the South Ossetia region by the Georgian government.

== Defection to Georgia ==
At a press conference on 13 November 2006, Kokoity termed Sanakoyev and Karkusov, head of the alternative election commission and a former adviser to Kokoity, "traitors to their homeland and traitors to the South Ossetian people." The South Ossetian media launched a campaign to discredit and compromise Sanakoyev, accusing him of corruption, duplicity, and collaborating with Georgian intelligence. In December 2006, Sanakoyev formed a government, choosing not to appoint a defense minister.

On 10 May 2007, Sanakoyev was appointed by the President of Georgia as the Head of South Ossetian Provisional Administrative Entity. The next day Sanakoyev addressed the Parliament of Georgia in Ossetic, outlining his vision for a resolution of the conflict in South Ossetia (full text). The move earned praise from the United States State Department, but alarmed the de facto authorities in Tskhinvali, which ordered the blocking of traffic to ethnic Georgian villages and threatened to oust Sanakoyev’s government by force, moves that received the disapproval of the Russian government.

On 26 June 2007, Sanakoyev delivered a speech, in his native Ossetian, at the EU-Georgian Parliamentary Cooperation Committee in Brussels, his first appeal to the international community. He emphasized that "a direct dialogue between the Georgian and Ossetian peoples, and demilitarization of the region, are of crucial importance ... The European type of autonomy, like in South Tyrol, can serve as a model ... in unified Georgia ... where liberal democracy is being built".

On 3 July 2008, Sanakoyev survived an attack on the convoy he was traveling in when it hit a remote-controlled mine. Both Sanakoyev's administration and Georgian police officials blamed forces loyal to Kokoity's separatist government of South Ossetia for organizing the incident, but a representative of that government denied any connection with the attack.

Political offices
Preceded by Merab Chigoev	Prime Minister of South Ossetia; 2001	Succeeded by Gerasim Khugayev
