= Orders, decorations, and medals of South Ossetia =

Decorations, medals of the Republic of South Ossetia

Orders, decorations and medals of South Ossetia is a system of awards of the Republic of South Ossetia established in 2007. Decorations are divided into two grades: orders and medals, and the medals can be divided between state awards and departmental awards.

== Orders ==
	Ribbon	Order	Native name
1		Order of Uatsamonga	Уацæмонга
2		Order of Honor	Кады нысан
3		Order of Friendship	Дружбы

== Medals ==
	Ribbon	Medal	Native name
1	Защитнику Отечества	Medal "Defender of the Fatherland"	Защитнику Отечества
2	За Службу на Страже Мира в Южной Осетии	Medal "For Service in Guarding Peace in South Ossetia"	За службу на страже мира в Южной Осетии
3	South Ossetia Medal "Veteran of the Armed Forces of the State of Alania"	Medal "Veteran of the Armed Forces of the State of Alania"	Ветеран Вооруженных Сил Государства Алания
4	ЗА БОЕВЫЕ ЗАСЛУГИ	Medal "For Military Merit"	За боевые заслуги
5	ЗА БОЕВОЕ СОДРУЖЕСТВО	Medal "For Commonwealth in Battle"	За боевое содружество
6	ЗА ВОИНСКУЮ ДОБЛЕСТЬ	Medal "For Military Prowess"	За воинскую доблесть
7	МЕДАЛЬ ХУБУЛОВА	Medal of "Khubulov"	Медаль Хубулова
8	Южная осетия вооруженные силы за 20 лет безупречной службы	Medal "South Ossetia Armed Forces for 20 Years of Service"	Южной Осетии вооруженные силы за 20 лет безупречной службы
9	Джиоты Алан	Medal of "Jyota Alan"	Джиоты Алан

== Gallery ==
Order of Uatsamonga

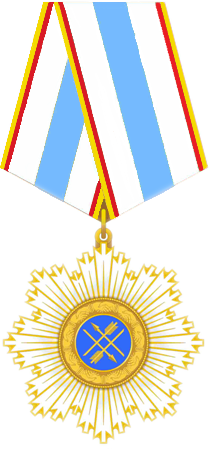
Order of Friendship

== See also ==
- Orders, decorations, and medals of Abkhazia
