= Joint Control Commission for Georgian–Ossetian Conflict Resolution =

Peacekeeping organization in the Caucasus (1992–2008)

The Joint Control Commission for Georgian–Ossetian Conflict Resolution (JCC) was a peacekeeping organization, operating in South Ossetia and overseeing the joint peacekeeping forces in the region. It was disbanded on October 10, 2008.

Created in 1992 after the South Ossetian War, the Commission consisted of four members with equal representation: Georgia, North Ossetia, Russia, and South Ossetia. Georgia declared its wish to withdraw from the JCC in March 2008, demanding a new 2+2+2 formula, including the EU, the Organization for Security and Co-operation in Europe (OSCE) and the Provisional Administrative Entity of South Ossetia in the place of North Ossetia. The command of the Georgian peacekeepers was transferred from the JCC to the Georgian Defense Ministry.

The commission was created by an agreement signed by the Head of Parliament of Georgia, Eduard Shevardnadze, and the President of Russia, Boris Yeltsin.

The Joint Peacekeeping Force (JPKF) created by the agreement consisted of three members with equal representation: Georgian, Russian and South Ossetian contingents. By September, 2008, Georgia left the JPKF following the Russo-Georgian War.

== Joint peacekeeping force (JPKF) in the 2008 Russo-Georgian War ==
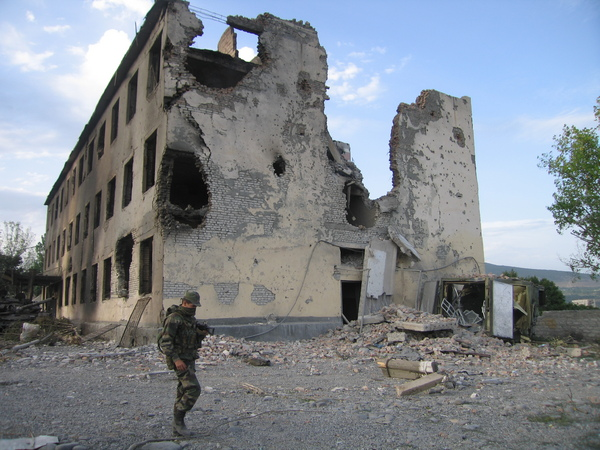
Headquarters of the Russian peacekeeping forces in Tskhinvali on August 18.

At 8:00 am on 1 August, a Georgian police lorry was blown up by an improvised explosive device on the road near Tskhinvali, injuring five Georgian policemen. In response, Georgian snipers assaulted some of the South Ossetian border checkpoints, killing four Ossetians and injuring seven. According to majority of reports, the South Ossetians were responsible for instigating the bomb explosion which marked the opening of hostilities.

The Russian deputy defence minister, Nikolay Pankov, had a secret meeting with the separatist authorities in Tskhinvali on 3 August. An evacuation of Ossetian women and children to Russia began on the same day. According to researcher Andrey Illarionov, the South Ossetian separatists evacuated more than 20,000 civilians, which represented more than 90 percent of the civilian population of the future combat zone.

Mortar and artillery exchange between the South Ossetian and Georgian forces erupted in the afternoon of 6 August along almost the entire line of contact, which lasted until the dawn of 7 August. Exchanges resumed following a brief gap in the morning. South Ossetian leader Eduard Kokoity announced that the South Ossetian armed forces were ready to go on the offensive in the next few hours. At 14:00 on 7 August, two Georgian peacekeepers were killed in Avnevi as a result of Ossetian shelling. At about 14:30, Georgian tanks, 122 mm howitzers and 203 mm self-propelled artillery began heading towards South Ossetia to dissuade separatists from additional attacks. During the afternoon, OSCE monitors recorded Georgian military traffic, including artillery, on roads near Gori. In the afternoon, Georgian personnel left the Joint Peacekeeping Force headquarters in Tskhinvali.

According to Gia Karkarashvili, ex-minister of defense of Georgia, Georgian servicemen of the JPKF were ordered by the Georgian command to leave their posts on August 7, at 3:00 p.m. This was one hour before the Georgian army received an order to move to the borders of South Ossetia. Karkarashvili claimed Georgian JPKF servicemen did not take part in the attack on the city they vowed to protect. However, Sergey Lavrov, minister of foreign affairs of Russia, later accused Georgian JPKF servicemen of taking part in the Georgian onslaught, and of "firing at their comrades-in-arms [from JPKF]".

Shortly before midnight of August 7, Mamuka Kurashvili, then a commander of the Georgian JPKF battalion, claimed Georgia started an operation to "reinstate constitutional order", and "cleanse the Georgian territory of criminal elements". Kurashvili took part in the attack on Tskhinvali.

According to Russian government, Russian peacekeeping battalion played a major role in the defense of Tskhinvali during the Georgian onslaught. Russian government reported ten peacekeepers from the Russian JPKF force were killed during the Georgian attacks on the base of Russian JPKF peacekeepers in Tskhinvali. According to Russian government: though vastly outnumbered, 250 Russian peacekeepers present in the cantonment repelled five Georgian attacks, destroyed six tanks, and four armored vehicles of the Georgian army. The peacekeepers were offering resistance for three days, until, on August 10, with Russian army units coming over from Northern Ossetia, Georgian army had to retreat from Tskhinvali. The Georgian army failed to take the cantonment of the Russian peacekeeping battalion.

Konstantin Timerman, acting commander of the Russian JPKF unit, was awarded the medal Hero of the Russian Federation, the highest award in the Russian military, and several servicemen of the unit were awarded the Order of Courage and the Cross of St. George for military heroism.

== Dissolution ==
On page 372 of volume III of the IIFFMCG report, the JPKF was disbanded as hostilities had ceased on the 10th of October, 2008 as the European Monitoring Commission had been deployed to the region.

== See also ==
- Sochi agreement
