= South Ossetian Regional Committee of the Communist Party of the Soviet Union =

The First Secretary of the South Ossetian regional branch of the Communist Party of the Soviet Union was the position of highest authority in the South Ossetia in the Soviet Union. The position was created in June 1918, and abolished in August 1991. The First Secretary was a de facto appointed position usually by the Politburo or the General Secretary himself.

== List of First Secretaries of the Communist Party of South Ossetia ==
Name	Term of Office		Life years
Name	Start	End	Life years
Chairman of the Organization Bureau
Vladimir Sanakoyev	June 1918	July 30, 1918	1884–1937
Chairman of the Regional Committee of the Communist Party
Vladimir Sanakoyev	July 30, 1918	1920	1884–1937
First Secretaries of the Regional Committee of the Communist Party
Sergey Gagloyev	1921	1921	1896–1938
Vladimir Sanakoyev	1921	April 22, 1924	1884–1937
Aleksandr Dzhatiyev	1924	?	1891–1937
Sergey Kudryavtsev	1929	1930?	1903–1938
Isaak Zhvaniya	1932	1934?	?–1937
Boris (Abdul-Bekir) Tautiyev	1936?	1937	?–1937
Georgiy Gochashvili	1937	1938	1904–?
Vladimir Tskhovrebashvili	February 1938	January 1949	1905–1977
Akaky Imnadze	January 1949	May 1953	1908–?
Ivan Kudzhiashvili	May 1953	1954	1906–?
Grigory Sanakoyev	1954	1959	1914–?
Vladimir Kozayev	1959	1962	1917–?
Iosif Chiayev	1962	February 1965	1907–?
Georgy Dzhussoyev	February 1965	November 1973	1926–
Feliks Sanakoyev	November 1973	April 1988	1939–
Anatoly Chekhoyev	April 1988	January 1990	1950–
Valnin Tskhovrebashvili	January 1990	February 1991	1933–
Znaur Gassiyev	February 1991	August 1991	1925–

== See also ==
- South Ossetia in the Soviet Union
- North Ossetian Regional Committee of the Communist Party of the Soviet Union

== Sources ==
- World Statesmen.org
