= Lyudvig Chibirov =

South Ossetian politician; former President of South Ossetia (born 1938)

- Цыбырты Людвиг (Iron Ossetic); Людвиг Чибиров (Russian)
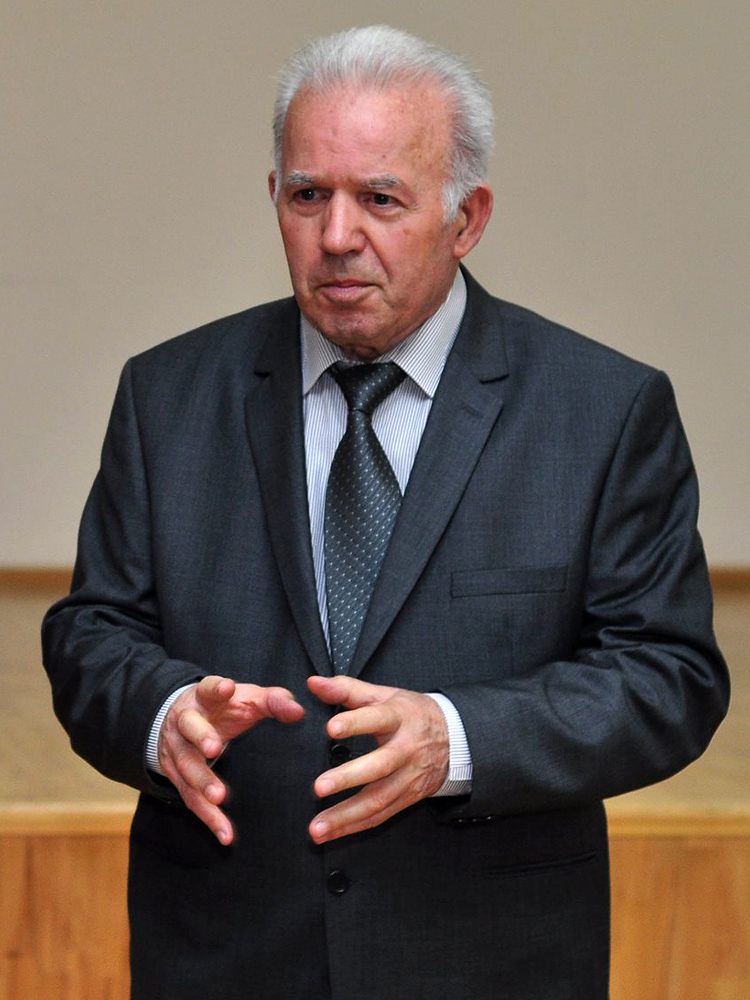
- Chibirov in 2015

1st President of South Ossetia
- In office 27 November 1996 – 18 December 2001
- Prime Minister: Valeriy Hubulov (acting); Aleksandr Shavlokhov; Merab Chigoev; Dmitry Sanakoyev
- Preceded by: Position established
- Succeeded by: Eduard Kokoity

Chairman of the Supreme Soviet
- In office 1994 – 27 November 1996
- Prime Minister: Feliks Zassiev; Vladislav Gabarayev; Valeriy Hubulov (acting)
- Preceded by: Position established
- Succeeded by: Position abolished

Chairman of the State Nyhas
- In office 17 September 1993 – 1994
- Prime Minister: Oleg Teziev; Gerasim Khugayev; Feliks Zassiev
- Preceded by: Torez Kulumbegov
- Succeeded by: Position abolished

Personal details
- Born: 19 November 1932 (age 93) Tskhinvali, South Ossetian Autonomous Oblast, Georgian SSR, USSR
- Party: Independent

Lyudvig Alekseyevich Chibirov (Iron Ossetic: Цыбырты Алексейы фырт Людвиг, romanized: Tseberte Alêksêye fert Lyudvig, Russian: Людвиг Алексеевич Чибиров; born 19 November 1932) was the Chairman of the Parliament and later, following inaugural elections the first president of South Ossetia. Born in 1932, Chibirov is a former member of the South Ossetian Parliament. Prior to the elections in 1996, he had been South Ossetia's head of state since 1993. When the post of Chairman of the Parliament was abolished in favor of the presidency, Chibirov became the first occupant of the new office.

During the 1996 elections, he received 65% of the vote compared with former Prime Minister Vladislav Gabaraev, who advocates South Ossetia's secession from the Republic of Georgia and its unification with North Ossetia in Russia, won about 20%. Georgian President Eduard Shevardnadze blasted the elections calling them "unlawful."

In the next elections in 2001, the 69-year-old Chibirov received less than 20% of the votes, while Stanislav Kochiev came in second with 25%, and the 38-year-old Eduard Kokoity (Kokoyev) won with more than 48% of the vote.

Political offices
Preceded by Torez Kulumbegov	Head of State of South Ossetia; 1993–2001	Succeeded by Eduard Kokoity
Preceded by Torez Kulumbegov	Chairman of the Supreme Council; 1993–1996	Succeeded by Kosta Georgievich Dzugaev
Preceded by position established	President of South Ossetia; 1996–2001	Succeeded by Eduard Kokoity
