= Order of Leon =

Republic of Abkhazia order

Awarded by Republic of Abkhazia
- Type: Order of merit
- Established: 4 December 1992
- Eligibility: Abkhazian and foreign citizens
- Awarded for: bravery in the service of the Republic of Abkhazia
- Status: Active

Precedence
- Next (higher): Order of Honour and Glory
- Next (lower): Order of Courage

Order of Leon is an Order of the Republic of Abkhazia.

Order of Leon has one class. It is awarded to is awarded to Abkhazian and foreign nationals for feats performed in a combat situation with a clear danger to life and ensuring the state security of the Republic of Abkhazia, in conditions associated with a risk to life. The author of the design of the order is Valery Gamgia.

It is named after Leon II of Abkhazia.

== Description ==
The order is a convex rhombus, the ends of which are made in the form of rays diverging from the center. In the middle of the badge is a circle, bordered by a bronze laurel wreath on a red enamel background with the inscription - Leon. In the center of the circle, on an enamel background is an image of the King Leon II of Abkhazia with a raised hand on a horse. Two crossed swords are located behind the main field of the order. The distance between the opposite ends of the rhombus is 56 mm.

== See also ==
- Leon II of Abkhazia
- Orders, decorations and medals of Abkhazia
