= Orders, decorations, and medals of Abkhazia =

Decorations, medals of the Republic of Abkhazia

Orders, decorations and medals of Abkhazia is a system of awards of the Republic of Abkhazia, formed by the Decree of the Supreme Council of the Republic of Abkhazia on 4 December 1992.

The awards of Abkhazia can be awarded to both citizens of Abkhazia and foreign citizens.

== Highest Title ==
Ribbon	Title	Native name
	Hero of Abkhazia	Aṕsny Afyrhaca

== Orders ==
	Ribbon	Order	Class	Native name
1		Order of Honour and Glory	1st	Akhdz-Apsha
1		Order of Honour and Glory	2nd	Akhdz-Apsha
1		Order of Honour and Glory	3rd	Akhdz-Apsha
2		Order of Leon		
3		Order of Courage		Afyrkhakarazy

== Medals ==
	Ribbon	Medal	Native name
1		Medal for Courage	Agumsharaz
2		Medal for Victory	Aiaairaz

== Gallery ==
Hero of Abkhazia

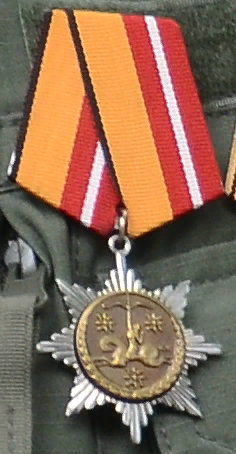
Order of Courage

== See also ==
- Orders, decorations and medals of South Ossetia
