= Order of Uatsamonga =

- Type: Award
- Awarded for: Special merits in society
- Country: South Ossetia
- Presented by: South Ossetia
- Eligibility: Ossetian and foreign citizens
- Established: 2007
- Ribbon bar of the award

Precedence
- Next (lower): Order of Honor

The Order of Uatsamonga (Iron Ossetic: Уацамонгӕ, Russian: Орден «Уацамонга», romanized: Orden "Uatsamonga") is a state award of South Ossetia. It was established in 2007. As of February 2015, it has no legislative support. In 2010, the Union of Knights of the Order was formed. The order is named for the Uatsamonga (Uacamonga), a magical cup mentioned in the Nart saga.

Many veterans of the Russo-Georgian War were awarded with the order, which afforded some veterans the highest paying pension.

== Statute ==
The order is awarded by the President of South Ossetia for displaying heroism and performing feats during the military conflicts. In May 2012, a meeting of the Knights of the Order discussed the draft law on the status of the award, which was planned to be submitted for consideration by the government on June 10 of the same year. In particular, it was assumed that persons awarded this order will be able to count on free medical care, education, travel in public transport and the receipt or construction of real estate. The order is awarded to cities when they are awarded the title Hero City.

Since 2019, holders of the order receive monthly payments to be added to salaries and/or pensions.

== Short description ==
The ribbon of the order consists of three equally wide alternating stripes, two red and one white, with a yellow border on the sides. The insignia looks like an eight-pointed silver star, partially covered with ruby enamel, with two gold crossed swords. On the central medallion, in a circle on white enamel, is the motto of the order and the image of a laurel branch. In the center of the medallion there is a golden relief image of a bowl.

== List of recipients ==
Awardee	Country	Date	Place
Hugo Chávez	Venezuela	23 July 2010	Caracas
Anatoly Bibilov	South Ossetia	2008	Tskhinvali
Vladimir Putin	Russia	2018	Moscow
Dmitry Medvedev (twice)	Russia	2018, 2023	Moscow
Valery Gergiev	Russia	2009	Moscow
Ibrahim Gazseev	South Ossetia	2008	Tskhinvali
Vitaly Churkin	Russia	2017 (posthumous)	Moscow
Bashar al-Assad	Ba'athist Syria	2018	Damascus
Daniel Ortega	Nicaragua	2010	Managua

== See also ==
- Orders, decorations, and medals of South Ossetia
