= Sochi agreement =

1992 treaty ending the South Ossetia War and Abkhazian War

The Sochi Agreement (officially titled in Russian: «Соглашение о принципах мирного урегулирования грузино-осетинского конфликта»), also known as the Dagomys Agreement (Дагомысские соглашения), primarily refers to the ceasefire agreement signed by Georgia and Russia in Sochi on June 24, 1992, which ended the South Ossetia War. The term may also refer to other agreements concluded in Sochi, including the Russo-Ukrainian agreement on the division of the Black Sea Fleet on June 23, 1992, the failed ceasefire agreement between Georgia and Russia during the War in Abkhazia on July 27, 1993, and a Russo-Georgian agreement concluded in 2003.

== South Ossetia agreement ==
Russia brokered a ceasefire and negotiated the agreement in 1992. The agreement primarily established a cease-fire between both the Georgian and South Ossetian forces, but it also defined a zone of conflict around the South Ossetian capital of Tskhinvali and established a security corridor along the border of the as yet unrecognized South Ossetian territories. The Agreement also created a Joint Control Commission and a peacekeeping body, the Joint Peacekeeping Forces group (JPKF). The JPKF was put under Russian command and was composed of peacekeepers from Georgia, Russia, and North Ossetia (as the separatist South Ossetian government was still unrecognized; South Ossetian peacekeepers, however, served in the North Ossetian contingent). In addition, the Organization for Security and Cooperation in Europe (OSCE) did agree to monitor the ceasefire and to facilitate negotiations. The OSCE sought to eliminate sources of tension, support the existing ceasefire, and facilitate a broader political framework to alleviate long term disharmony.

== Abkhazia agreement ==
Once again, a Russian brokered agreement in 1993, the Agreement on a ceasefire in Abkhazia and On a Mechanism To Ensure Its Observance, allowed for a moratorium on the use of force, the withdrawal of conflicting parties from the warzone within fifteen days, establishing a Russian-Georgian-Abkhaz control group to monitor the ceasefire, the return of the Abkhazian parliament to Sukhumi, the placement of UN observers in the territory, and the resumption of talks to settle the dispute. In August of the same year UNOMIG was put in place as the UN monitoring force. The truce was violated on September 27, when Abkhaz separatist forces launched an attack and captured the regional capital, Sukhumi, despite the presence of Russian peacekeepers, which prompted allegations that Russia had allowed the offensive to ensure a separatist victory. The conflict officially ended after the Agreement on a Cease-fire and Separation of Forces, also known as the 1994 Moscow Agreement, was signed the following year.

Once again, on March 6–7, 2003, Georgian president Eduard Sheverdnadze and Russian president Vladimir Putin signed another agreement that sought to include economic rehabilitation, resumption of rail networks, and the attraction of international investment. This would happen to turn into a disappointment, especially for the Georgians.

== Other Sochi summits ==
Russian president Boris Yeltsin and Ukrainian president Leonid Kravchuk held Russian-Ukrainian summit in Dagomys on 23 June 1992, where they partially resolved their dispute over Black Sea Fleet, agreeing on a joint use of the bases in Crimea and on division of Black Sea Fleet, while postponing talks on how to apportion the 45 cruisers, 28 submarines, 300 small and medium-sized ships, 150 aircraft, and 85 helicopters in the fleet. Georgia has also claimed parts of the fleet. Russia and Ukraine also agreed on introduction of hryvnia as Ukraine's new currency and to shift to world prices in their bilateral trade. They pledged to "work in concert to resolve violent conflicts in the region" and Yeltsin suggested a joint Russian-Ukrainian conference on Transnistria conflict. The sides failed to reach agreement on the control of nuclear weapons in Ukraine. Russia and Ukraine signed a general agreement on friendly ties and agreed to start negotiations on a new political treaty to confirm this relationship.

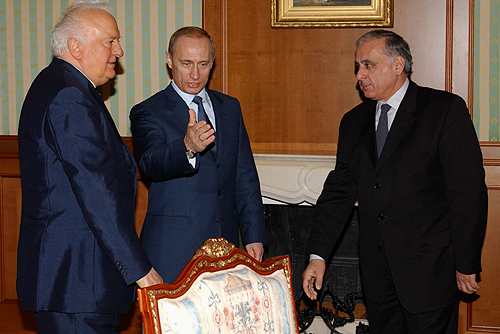
Then president of Russia Vladimir Putin meeting with then president of Georgia Eduard Shevardnadze and then prime minister of Abkhazia Gennady Gagulia in Sochi on 7 March 2003.

In 2003, Russian president Vladimir Putin met Georgian president Shevardnadze and Abkhazian PM Gennady Gagulia and set in motion a Sochi process that sought to create a Georgian-Russian-Abkhaz working groups on confidence building measures's (CBM). The parties sought to make it easier for the return of refugees and economic reconstruction. The Sochi process signified a regress from the multilateral to a bilateral format that left Georgia on its own to face Russia and the Abkhaz. It also was seen to undermine Georgia's argument that the Geneva process was the sole format for a comprehensive settlement of the conflict. In 2004, Russia was seen to violate the agreement as a Russian company begun maintenance work on the Sochi-Sukhumi railroad, which was legally Georgian, though controlled by Russia and the Abkhaz. The move was seen as a violation whereby restoration could only proceed in parallel with the safe return of Georgian refugees to Abkhazia beginning with the Gali district. However, there had been no progress on the return of refugees, and so, unilateral Russian actions on the railroad violated the Sochi agreement.

In 2008, U.S. president George W. Bush and Putin made a last-ditch attempt as incumbent presidents to resolve a protracted dispute over European missile defenses at another Sochi summit. This followed Russian officials objecting to U.S. plans to deploy ballistic missile defenses (BMD) in Poland and the Czech Republic. They had claimed that the stated American justification for the BMD deployments—that the systems are needed to defend the United States and European countries against an emerging Iranian missile threat—lacked credibility. Instead, they insisted the true objective of such moves along Russia's periphery was to weaken Russia's nuclear deterrent.

== See also ==
- Russian–Turkish memorandum, about the 2019 Turkish offensive into Syria
