= South Ossetia war (1991–1992) =

Conflict between Georgia and Russian-backed Ossetian separatists

1991–1992 South Ossetia War
- Part of Wars in the Caucasus, Georgian–Ossetian conflict and Dissolution of the Soviet Union
- Map of South Ossetia after the war, showing territories under Georgian and under South Ossetian separatist control
Date	5 January 1991 – 24 June 1992 (1 year, 5 months, 2 weeks and 5 days)
Location	South Ossetia, Georgia
Result	Inconclusive
Territorial changes	Division of South Ossetia into zones controlled by Georgia and South Ossetian separatists. Georgia maintains control of one-third of South Ossetia, mostly ethnically Georgian villages, while the rest is either controlled by the separatist government or is left in no-man's-land.

Belligerents
(Georgia (country)) Georgia	South Ossetia; Russia; (1992)

Commanders and leaders
(Georgia (country)) Zviad Gamsakhurdia; (Georgia (country)) Eduard Shevardnadze; (Georgia (country)) Tengiz Kitovani; (Georgia (country)) Dilar Khabuliani	(South Ossetia) Torez Kulumbegov; (South Ossetia) Znaur Gassiev; (South Ossetia) Oleg Teziev; (South Ossetia) Valeriy Hubulov; (South Ossetia) Alan Dzhioev; (Russia) Alexander Rutskoy; (Russia) Ruslan Khasbulatov

Units involved
(Georgia (country)) Georgian Defense Ministry forces (Georgia (country)) National Guard of Georgia (Georgia (country)) Internal Troops of Georgia Paramilitaries: Mkhedrioni	(South Ossetia) South Ossetian Republican Guard; (South Ossetia) South Ossetian irregulars; (North Ossetia–Alania) North Ossetian volunteers

Strength
(Georgia (country)) 3,000	(South Ossetia) Republican Guards: About 2,400; (South Ossetia) Irregulars: unknown

Casualties and losses
- Approximately 1,000 fatalities overall and 60,000–100,000 people displaced.

The 1991–1992 South Ossetia War (also known as the First South Ossetia War) was fought between Georgian government forces and ethnic Georgian militias on one side and the forces of South Ossetian separatists and Russia on the other. The war ended with a Dagomys Agreement, signed on 24 June 1992, which established a joint peacekeeping force and left South Ossetia divided between the rival authorities.

== Background ==
The territory of South Ossetia was part of Georgian kingdoms throughout antiquity and Middle Ages. Ossetian migration to the region began in the 13th and 14th centuries and is believed to be connected to the fall of Kingdom of Alania in the North Caucasus to the Mongols and later to Timur's armies. They retreated into the mountains of the central Caucasus and gradually started moving south, across the Caucasus Mountains into the Kingdom of Georgia. (Note: Coene, page 151) In the 17th century, under pressure from the Kabardian princes, Ossetians started a second wave of migration from the North Caucasus to the Kingdom of Kartli.

In 18th century, Ossetians became the first people in the Caucasus to form an alliance with Russia. Ossetia was among the first areas of the northern Caucasus to come under Russian domination, starting in 1774, and the capital, Vladikavkaz, was the first Russian military outpost in the region. By 1830, Ossetia was completely under Russian control.

Following the breakdown of the Tsarist regime in Russia, Ossetians allied with the Russian Bolsheviks, fighting a war against the newly independent Menshevik Georgia. Initially Georgia was successful, but in 1921, the Red Army invaded and conquered the country. In 1922 South Ossetian Autonomous Oblast was established within the Georgian Soviet Socialist Republic (SOAO) by the Soviet administration under pressure from Kavburo (the Caucasian Bureau of the Central Committee of the Russian Communist Party). It is believed that the SAOA was established by central Soviet government in exchange for Ossetian loyalty and support of Russian Bolsheviks in their fight against Georgian Mensheviks. This area had never been a separate entity prior to the Russian invasion. (Note: De Waal et al, Beyond Frozen Conflict, chapter 6. South Ossetia Today) The drawing of administrative boundaries of the South Ossetian AO was quite a complicated process. Many Georgian villages were included within the South Ossetian AO despite numerous protests by the Georgian population. While the city of Tskhinvali did not have a majority Ossetian population, it was made the capital of the South Ossetian AO. Between 1944 and 1952 Ossetian language schools were closed by the Soviet Union and the broadcasting and publishing in Ossetian was curtailed.

During the collapse of the Soviet Union, the tensions began to grow between Georgians and Ossetians as Georgians pushed for independence from the Soviet Union, while Ossetians wanted to remain within the renewed federation. In 1989, around 98,000 people lived in South Ossetia. Of these, 66.61% were Ossetian and 29.44% Georgian. Another 99,000 Ossetians lived throughout the rest of Georgia. The South Ossetian Popular Front (Ademon Nykhas) was created in 1988, a first Ossetian nationalist organization in the region which called for separation from Georgia. On 10 November 1989, the local South Ossetian authorities made a decision to transform South Ossetia into an "autonomous republic". This decision was revoked by the Georgian Supreme Soviet. On 23 November 1989, Georgians led by dissident Zviad Gamsakhurdia planned to organize a rally against what they saw as growing separatist tendencies of South Ossetian authorities in Tskhinvali, the capital of South Ossetia. South Ossetians prevented this by blocking the road. Violent clashes broke out resulting in several people being wounded. The Kremlin encouraged Ossetian separatism to undermine stability in Georgia and weaken its national independence movement. South Ossetia's territory cuts through historically Georgian lands. Its separation would wreak havoc on Georgia's territorial integrity, communications, and economy.

To counter pro-independence movements in the constituent Soviet republics, the Soviet government under Mikhail Gorbachev adopted a policy of supporting separatist entities within these republics to pressure them to remain in the Soviet Union. In April 1990, a law on the 'Delimitation of Powers' was passed by the USSR Supreme Soviet, which equalized rights of autonomies with those of the union republics. This meant that they could participate in negotiating New Union Treaty, which many union republics rejected. Gorbachev warned Georgia that if it tried to leave the "brotherly union", it would face problems in the regions on its own territory. Anti-Georgian sentiment began to grow in South Ossetia and Abkhazia with clandestine and open support from Moscow. The Ossetian and also Abkhaz separatists began to voice demands against Georgia, and received the arms and financial assistance from the Kremlin.

To counter Gorbachev's plans, the union republics passed the declarations of sovereignties which asserted the priority of the constituent republican power over the central power on their territories. While this did not mean full secession from the USSR, it was an important step towards such development. In May 1990, Georgian SSR passed a declaration of sovereignty. At the same time, at an extraordinary session of the Supreme Soviet of the Georgian SSR convened on 9 March 1990, the Soviet invasion of Georgia was officially denounced as "an occupation and effective annexation of Georgia by Soviet Russia." The Soviet Georgian government made another concession to the pro-independence movement in Georgia after officially dubbing the 1921 Red Army Invasion of Georgia as an "illegal occupation" and announced first multiparty election in the republic to take place in October 1990.

Meanwhile, on 11 September 1990, the regional South Ossetian Oblast Soviet declared independence from Georgia. The South Ossetian Soviet Democratic Republic was proclaimed within the Soviet Union. This contradicted plans of Georgian dissidents who wanted to declare independence from the USSR. The Georgian dissidents claimed that the Soviet authorities were using Ossetian separatism to pressure Georgia to remain in the Soviet Union. On 28 October 1990, the first free parliamentary elections were held in Georgian SSR, which saw a coalition of pro-independence Georgian dissidents led by Zviad Gamsakhurdia winning the majority in the Supreme Soviet. The election was boycotted by South Ossetians, and they responded by organizing their own vote for a South Ossetian parliament.

On 11 December 1990, Zviad Gamsakhurdia's government declared the South Ossetian election illegitimate and abolished South Ossetia's political status altogether to counteract separatism. (Note: ICG, "Georgia: Avoiding War in South Ossetia", page 3) Gamsakhurdia said that Ossetians had no right to declare independence on Georgian territory.

== Combatants ==
South Ossetian forces consisted of militia, volunteers from North Ossetia and other regions in North Caucasus. Most of their equipment and arms were former Soviet arms abandoned following the break-up of the Soviet Union. Former Georgian president, Eduard Shevardnadze, accused Russia of military involvement in the conflict. At the same time, the Ossetians claimed that Russian military and police failed to protect the local civilian population during Georgian attacks on Tskhinvali and surrounding Ossetian villages. The Georgian side claimed there was overt help from military units of the Russian Federation.

In early 1990, South Ossetia had only 300–400 poorly armed fighters. Led by the South Ossetian "Defense Minister" Oleg Teziev, a militia network across the region was created and professionalized as the South Ossetian force grew to 1,500 full-time fighters plus 3,500 volunteers. Georgia's forces were in much poorer shape. The ragtag Georgian forces composed of ethnic Georgians were not as well trained and equipped as their opponents. The Georgian National Guard that fought in the war was formed in January 1991, just before the fighting started. It was supposed to be a 12,000 strong force raised by conscription, but because of financial difficulties it had to be formed from volunteers instead. Several informal Georgian militias also participated in the conflict, including White Eagles (splinter group of the National Guard), White George, Black Panthers, Kutaisi National Guard and Merab Kostava Society. In late 1991, Gamsakhurdia purchased from Romania 1,000 AK-47 rifles at an apparently discounted price, $150 each, when the typical price for a Kalashnikov rifle during 1990–1991 was in the $250–$300 range.

== War ==
In December 1990, the situation in the region became increasingly chaotic. Towards the end of 1990, the situation for ethnic Georgians in Tskhinvali worsened sharply. There were reports of multiple cases of lootings and beatings committed both by Georgian and Ossetian paramilitaries. On 12 December 1990, gunmen driving a car in Tskhinvali opened fire from a submachine gun, killing three Georgians and wounding two in what has been described as a terrorist attack and an act of ethnic violence. Following this, Georgia declared a state of emergency in South Ossetia. The units of the Georgian MVD and the KGB entered the region to enforce the state of emergency. The commander of the Georgian Interior Ministry troops was appointed as mayor of Tskhinvali.

TASS reported on 28 December that some 2,000 people had stormed police headquarters in the South Ossetian capital, Tskhinvali, on 27 December and taken a group of Georgian policemen hostage. The hostages were released only after police set free a local man arrested for illegal possession of a firearm. By 1 January 1991, Ossetians had built barricades in Tskhinvali with concrete slabs, sandbags and trolley buses.

In the first days of January 1991, several Georgian militiamen were assassinated in Tskhinvali. On the night of 5 to 6 January 1991, the additional Georgian MVD units and the Georgian National Guard entered the city. According to Georgian media, the units sent to South Ossetia numbered 3000 men. Georgia also imposed an economic blockade on South Ossetia and blocked the road to Tskhinvali, while the Ossetians blockaded Georgian villages.

The urban warfare raged in Tskhinvali in the following three weeks. Tskhinvali was divided into an Ossetian-controlled western part and a Georgian-controlled eastern part. Ossetians engaged in shoot-outs with Georgian troops and threw home-made bombs, but later began to shoot from houses as Georgians tried to flatten the barricades with APCs. On 7 January, the Soviet President Mikheil Gorbachev ordered all armed formations to leave the region except those of the USSR Ministry of Internal Affairs. This also meant removal of the Georgian MVD and KGB troops which had been placed there since 12 December 1990. Gorbachev declared the South Ossetian declaration of independence from Georgia (while April 1990 law granted autonomies many new rights, it still did not grant them right to change their status) and Georgia's abolition of South Ossetia's autonomy as illegitimate. On 9 January, the Georgian Supreme Soviet held an extraordinary session and declared Gorbachev's decree as "interference into Georgia’s internal affairs". Chairman of Georgia's Supreme Soviet Zviad Gamsakhurdia stated that Gorbachev had provoked the confrontation to impose a direct presidential rule in the region, and that Georgia would not obey his decrees. Meanwhile, North and South Ossetia supported Gorbachev's decision.

On 25 January 1991, a ceasefire was negotiated by the Soviet troops between Georgian Minister of Internal Affairs Dilar Khabuliani and Ossetian representatives, which led to the Georgians withdrawal to the hills around the city. However, the economic blockade of South Ossetia was kept in place.

On 30 January, a leader of South Ossetian separatists, chairman of South Ossetian Oblast Soviet Torez Kulumbegov was arrested in Tbilisi. Georgian MVD had completed their withdrawal from Tskhinvali and according to a Georgian MVD spokesman, no shooting had been reported in the town for past three days.

According to TASS, barricades reappeared in Tskhinvali on 30 January, and the Soviet troops were ambushed while trying to take them down on the next day. According to Georgians, the Ossetians started burning down houses belonging to Georgians in Tskhinvali and surrounding villages, while according to Ossetians, Georgians starting shelling the city from the hills. In February 1991, the Soviet troops were patrolling Tskhinvali with the fighting renewing sporadically.

On 6 March, a statement signed by Zviad Gamsakhurdia on resolving the conflict was released, offering South Ossetia a cultural autonomy, local elections, and a local police force in exchange for dissolving the illegal armed groups.

The war in South Ossetia remained remarkably static, if brutal, throughout its course and had several peaks of intense fighting. Georgian forces took up positions in the hills around Tskhinvali and besieged the city. Other fighting took place around the city in the nearby villages and along the road to North Ossetia. The most intense period of war was in March and April 1991. On 23 March 1991, the chairman of Russia's Supreme Soviet, Boris Yeltsin, met Gamsakhurdia in Kazbegi, northeast Georgia, and agreed to push for efforts to withdraw Soviet troops from South Ossetia and create a joint Georgian-Russian police force to restore peace in the region. On 24 March, a temporary ceasefire was signed. However, the RSFSR Supreme Soviet rejected the agreement.

Zviad Gamsakhurdia asserted that the Soviet leadership was encouraging South Ossetian separatism in order to force Georgia not to leave the Soviet Union. Georgia declared its independence in April 1991.

According to Gerasim Khugaev, a South Ossetian chief administrator who replaced Torez Kulumbegov, by April 1991 Ossetians controlled the city of Tskhinvali, the Dzhava district and several other villages. Georgians had mostly left Ossetian areas and vice versa. The Dzhava district, a mountainous and hardly accessible region, remained largely unaffected by fighting, but on 29 April 1991 it suffered an earthquake which left 58 people dead and 6,500 people homeless.

In May 1991, an agreement was signed between Georgia, North Ossetia, the USSR, and the RSFSR to create a Joint Commission to resolve the conflict. In the period of June, July and August, the region remained relatively peaceful. A Joint Commission failed to be re-established after the summer vacation and the August Coup in Moscow, and the fighting resumed. In mid-September, Gamsakhurdia ordered the Georgian National Guard to advance into South Ossetia. As the National Guard was in the active state of mutiny against the President and Georgia was on the brink of civil war, only a few detachments followed the order, and they were repelled by the South Ossetian militia.

In late December 1991, the armed opposition and the rebel factions of the National Guard launched military coup in Tbilisi against Gamsakhurdia, leading to some Georgian paramilitaries departing from South Ossetia to Tbilisi. During the Tbilisi coup, violence in South Ossetia was limited to sporadic gunfire outside Tskhinvali. The conflict intensified in January 1992. Taking advantage of political paralysis in Tbilisi, on 19 January 1992 the separatists organized a referendum on Ossetian-controlled territories on proclaiming independence or joining Russian Federation. Using their newly obtained weapons and in particular artillery, Georgian National Guard and Mkhedrioni forces began a siege of Tskhinvali and outlying villages.

In spring 1992 the fighting escalated again, with sporadic Russian involvement. Independent sources confirm that the Russian army assisted and supplied the Ossetian rebels during the conflict. In March 1992, Eduard Shevardnadze assumed duties as the chairman of Georgia's ruling State Council. Soon after, Gamsakhurdia loyalists staged an armed rebellion, which consumed much of the new government's attention.

On 12 May 1992 Georgian officials sent 250 policemen to Tskhinvali, but Ossetian militants tried to capture them and led an assault on Georgian villages of Tamarasheni and Eredvi. Georgians counter-attacked and captured the village of Prisi near Tskhinvali. On 29 May, the Supreme Soviet of South Ossetia proclaimed the state sovereignty. In early June, Georgians advanced further towards the direction of the Tskhinvali and caputed the village of Teki in the vicinity of the city. On 10 June 1992, chairman of Georgia's State Council Eduard Shevardnadze and North Ossetian president Akhsarbek Galazov agreed on a ceasefire and a joint commission to monitor the situation, but the agreement collapsed soon, and fighting concentrated around the village of Teki. Georgians launched artillery assault on Tskhinvali. At that time, the South Ossetian conflict was one of the points of contention in Russia between the Russian parliament dominated by left-wing and nationalist opposition, and the democrats or pro-Western group which supported Russian president Boris Yeltsin. The left-wing and nationalist groups called for an anti-Georgian policy and annexation of South Ossetia into the Russian Federation, while the democrats supported Georgia's territorial integrity. As Russian president Boris Yeltsin departed to the US and Canada to agree on the Western aid to Russia, chairman of Russian parliament Ruslan Khasbulatov took a heavy-handed approach against Georgia and issued a statement, accusing Georgia of "genocide" and threatening to annex South Ossetia if Georgia did not sign a ceasefire agreement which would place the Russian peacekeepers in the region. Russian troops mobilized near Georgia–Russia border, and Russian helicopter gunships opened fire on Georgian tanks. The Georgian media reported that Georgia and Russia were on the brink of war and that the relations between the countries "had never been so tense".

On 24 June 1992, the Dagomys Agreement was signed between Russian president Boris Yeltsin and Georgian leader Eduard Shevardnadze. The ceasefire agreement left South Ossetia divided into areas controlled by Georgia and areas controlled by the unrecognised government of South Ossetia. It also created the Joint Control Commission (including Georgia, Russia, North Ossetia and South Ossetia) and, under JCC mandate, introduced the joint peacekeeping forces (JPKF), made up of Georgian, Russian and Ossetian soldiers. A small number of Organization for Security and Co-operation in Europe monitors was also deployed in the area.

== Aftermath ==
The military action of the conflict was "confused and anarchic". Neither side had disciplined armed formations, and commanders and soldiers were often acting in their own interests, even Russian local commanders. Military groups were controlled by political factions and not accountable to the respective governments. This led to the violation of ceasefires, taking of hostages and bombardment of civilian targets. Additionally, the North Ossetia-Georgian border went largely uncontrolled, providing an almost unhindered access point for weapons, fighters, and ammunition.

According to Human Rights Watch, the Georgian residents in Tskhinvali began to leave the city as soon as the war started on 6 January 1991 because of street fightings and violence committed by Ossetians against Georgians. At the same time, Georgian paramilitaries began similar retaliations and Ossetian civilians fled to Vladikavkaz in North Ossetia. During the war Georgian paramilitary groups committed acts of violence against Ossetian civilians within South Ossetia that were motivated by the desire to expel Ossetians and reclaim villages for Georgia, and by sheer revenge against the Ossetian people. Between 60 and 100 villages were burned down, destroyed by Georgian forces or otherwise abandoned. Several villages were ethnically cleansed by Georgian forces. On the other side, Georgians living in Ossetian controlled territory were "easy targets": Houses occupied by Georgians were singled out, looted and burned down. In the beginning of the conflict, Georgia cut off telephone connection, electricity and gas supply to South Ossetia, putting the region under the blockade. According to the Human Rights Watch the goal of the blockade was to harass the Ossetians. According to the Georgian power workers, they suspended power to the region because Ossetian separatists were using two factories there to illegally manufacture arms and assault Georgian families, and that they did not want to supply power for such actions. They stated that the blockade would be lifted if the separatist side agreed to conduct inspection of factories by a joint commission. The blockade reportedly resulted in cold-related casualties among the newborn in the Tskhinvali hospital.

During the war, approximately 1,000 people died. It also led to the creation of large numbers of refugees: more than 40,000 ethnic Ossetians were forced to flee from South Ossetia and Georgia proper, mainly into North Ossetia (part of Russia) and a further 23,000 ethnic Georgians fled from South Ossetia and settled in other Georgian areas. The flow of refugees into Northern Ossetia aggravated the tense ethnic situation there and played a significant role in the Ossetian–Ingush conflict. The South Ossetian refugees were met with dislike by many among North Ossetians, who disparagingly called them "Gamsiks" (after Zviad Gamsakhurdia), which has been described by some as an expression of North Ossetian nationalism in relation to South Ossetians.

== See also ==
- Georgian–Ossetian conflict
- Russo-Georgian War
