= South Ossetian Autonomous Oblast =

Former subdivisions in the Soviet Union

Coordinates: 42°20′N 44°00′E

South Ossetian Autonomous Oblast Хуссар Ирыстоны автономон бӕстӕ (Iron Ossetic) სამხრეთ ოსეთის ავტონომიური ოლქი (Georgian) Юго-Осетинская автономная область (Russian)
- Autonomous oblast of the Georgian SSR
- 1922–1990
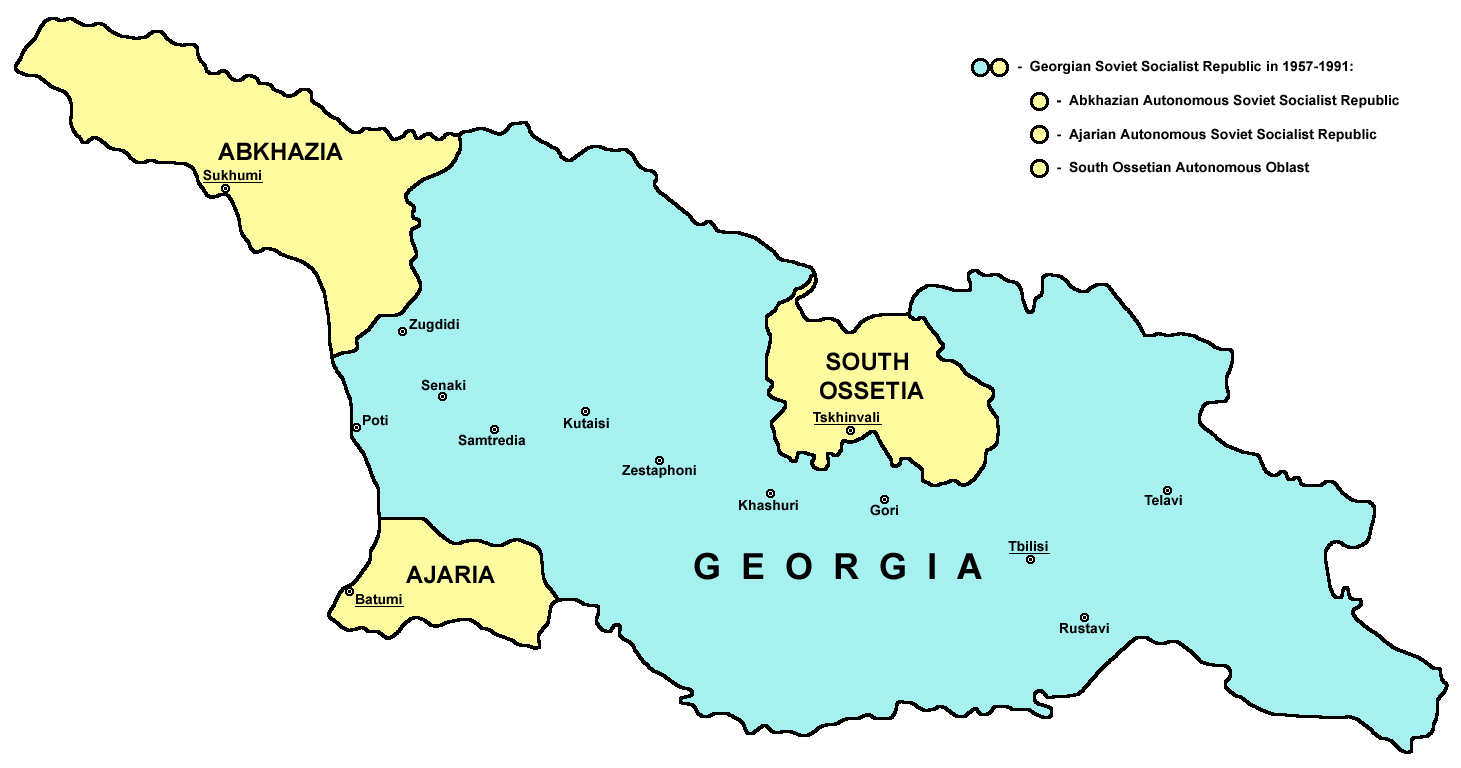
- Map of the Georgian SSR, 1957–1990. The South Ossetian AO is in the middle, highlighted in yellow.
- Capital: Tskhinvali (Note: Known between 1934 and 1961 as Staliniri)
  - Type: Autonomous oblast
- History
  - Established: 20 April 1922
  - Disestablished: 20 September 1990
Preceded by	Succeeded by
Democratic Republic of Georgia	South Ossetian Soviet Democratic Republic

South Ossetian Soviet Democratic Republic Хуссар Ирыстоны Советон Демократон Республикæ (Iron Ossetic) Юго-Осетинская Советская Демократическая Республика (Russian)
- Unrecognized republic of the Soviet Union
- 1990–1991
- Flag
- Capital: Tskhinvali
  - Type: Soviet republic
- History
  - Established: 20 September 1990
  - Disestablished: 21 December 1991
Preceded by	Succeeded by
South Ossetian Autonomous Oblast	South Ossetia; Georgia

The South Ossetian Autonomous Oblast (Note: Russian: Юго-Осетинская автономная область, romanized: Yugo-Osetinskaya avtonomnaya oblast'; Georgian: სამხრეთ ოსეთის ავტონომიური ოლქი, romanized: samkhret osetis avt'onomiuri olki; Iron Ossetic: Хуссар Ирыстоны автономон бӕстӕ, romanized: Xussar Irystony avtonomon bæstæ) was an autonomous oblast of the Soviet Union created within the Georgian SSR on April 20, 1922. It was an ethnic enclave created for the Ossetians within Georgia by Soviets as a reward for their political loyalty during the 1921 Soviet invasion of Georgia. Following the collapse of the Soviet Union and the South Ossetia war, its territory is controlled by the self-proclaimed Republic of South Ossetia, which is recognized only by five states, while Georgia and other countries consider it to be territory of Georgia.

The population of the South Ossetian AO consisted mostly of ethnic Ossetians, who made up roughly 66% of the 100,000 people living there in 1989, and Georgians, who constituted a further 29% of the population as of 1989.

== History ==
=== Background ===
The territory of South Ossetia was part of Georgian kingdoms throughout antiquity and Middle Ages. Ossetian migration to the region began in the 13th and 14th centuries and is believed to be connected to the fall of Kingdom of Alania in the North Caucasus to the Mongols and later to Timur's armies. They retreated into the mountains of the central Caucasus and gradually started moving south, across the Caucasus Mountains into the Kingdom of Georgia. (Note: Coene, page 151) In the 17th century, under pressure from the Kabardian princes, Ossetians started a second wave of migration from the North Caucasus to the Kingdom of Kartli.

In 18th century, Ossetians became the first people in the Caucasus to form an alliance with Russia. Ossetia was among the first areas of the northern Caucasus to come under Russian domination, starting in 1774, and the capital, Vladikavkaz, was the first Russian military outpost in the region. The Georgian Kingdom of Kartli-Kakheti, which included the territory of modern South Ossetia, was annexed by the Russian Empire in 1801. Ossetian migration to Georgian areas continued in the 19th and 20th centuries, when Georgia was part of the Russian Empire.

=== Establishment ===
Following the Russian revolution, the area of modern South Ossetia became part of the Democratic Republic of Georgia. In 1918, conflict began between the landless Ossetian peasants living in Shida Kartli (Interior Georgia), who were influenced by Bolshevism and demanded ownership of the lands they worked, and the Menshevik government backed ethnic Georgian aristocrats, who were legal owners. Although the Ossetians were initially discontented with the economic policies of the central government, the tension soon transformed into ethnic conflict. The first Ossetian rebellion began February 1, 1918, when three Georgian princes were killed and their land was seized by the Ossetians. The central government of Tiflis retaliated by sending the National Guard to the area. However, the Georgian unit retreated after they had engaged the Ossetians. Ossetian rebels then proceeded to occupy the town of Tskhinvali and began attacking ethnic Georgian civilian population. During uprisings in 1919 and 1920, the Ossetians were covertly supported by Soviet Russia, but even so, were defeated. Between 3,000 and 7,000 Ossetians were killed during the crushing of the 1920 uprising.

There was discussion to create a united republic for Ossetians, incorporating both North and South Ossetia. This was indeed proposed by Ossetian authorities in July 1925 to Anastas Mikoyan, the head of the kraikom (Bolshevik committee in charge of the Caucasus). Sergo Orjonikidze had opposed incorporating the proposed state into Russia, fearing it would lead to unrest in Georgia, so Mikoyan asked Stalin about placing all of Ossetia within Georgia. Stalin initially approved, but later decided against it, fearing it would lead to other ethnic groups in Russia demanding to leave the RSFSR, which would destroy the federation. Thus South Ossetia was remained within Georgia, while North Ossetia remained in the RSFSR.

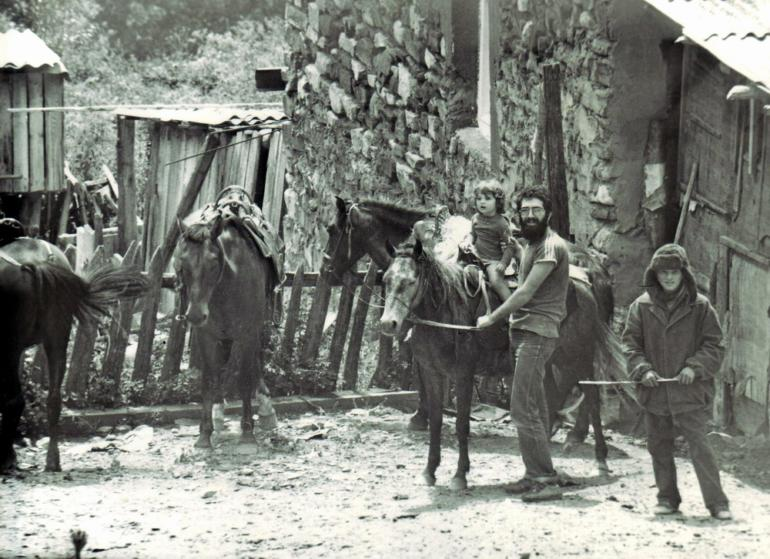
Village in the Roki Pass, 1986

=== End of the South Ossetian AO ===
In 1989, during the dissolution of the Soviet Union, violent unrest broke out in Tskhinvali between the Georgian independence-minded population of the region and Ossetians loyal to the Soviet Union. In September 1990 Ossetian nationalists in the South Ossetia's regional soviet declared independence from Georgia by announcing the creation of the "South Ossetian Soviet Democratic Republic" loyal to Moscow. After the Georgia's October elections to the Supreme Soviet, on December 11 1990, the autonomous Oblast held rival elections. On 12 December, gunmen driving a car in Tskhinvali opened fire from a submachine gun, killing three Georgians and wounding two in what has been described as a terrorist attack and an act of ethnic violence. The Supreme Soviet of the Georgian SSR responded to these actions by annulling the autonomy of South Ossetia and declaring a state of emergency to restore order.

== Culture and society ==
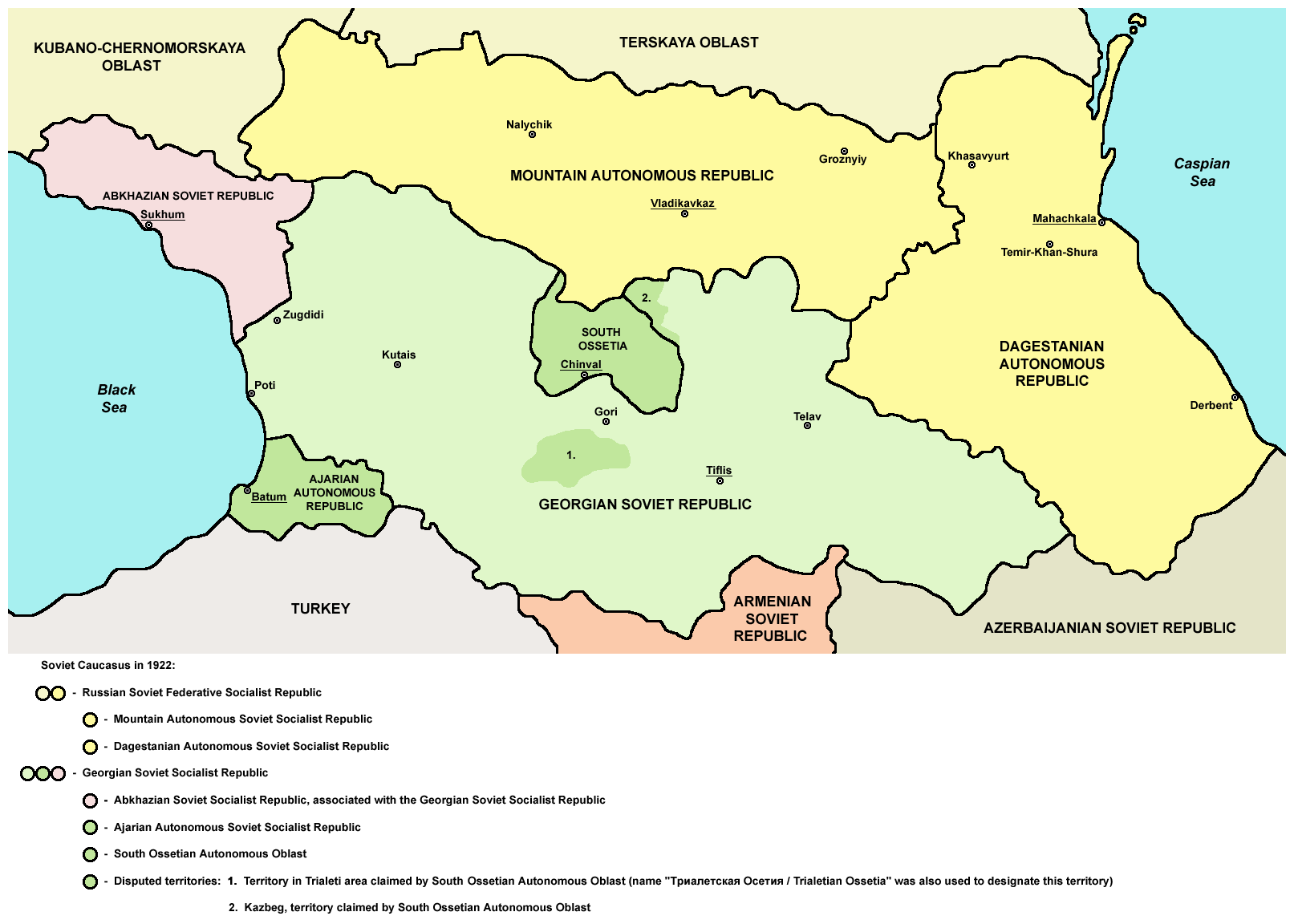
Caucasus territory in 1922 with South Ossetia (center, marked dark green, bordered) and disputed territories claimed by it shown (marked dark green, non-bordered, numbered)

=== Demographics ===
The main ethnic group of the South Ossetian AO was the Ossetians. Throughout the entire existence of the region, the Ossetians represented a stable majority of over two-thirds of the population. Georgians constituted the only significant minority, with between 25 and 30% of the population. No other ethnic group constituted more than 3% of the total population. About half of all families in the region were of mixed Ossetian–Georgian heritage. Considerable numbers of Ossetians lived elsewhere in Georgia as well, with upwards of 100,000 spread across the country.

Ethnicity	1926	1939	1959	1979	1989
Ossetians	60,351 (69.1%)	72,266 (68.1%)	63,698 (65.8%)	66,073 (66.5%)	65,232 (66.2%)
Georgians	23,538 (26.9%)	27,525 (25.9%)	26,584 (27.5%)	28,125 (28.3%)	28,544 (29.0%)
Jews	1,739 (2.0%)	1,979 (1.9%)	1,723 (1.8%)	1,485 (1.5%)	396 (0.4%)
Armenians	1,374 (1.6%)	1,537 (1.4%)	1,555 (1.6%)	1,254 (1.3%)	984 (1.0%)
Russians	157 (0.2%)	2,111 (2.0%)	2,380 (2.5%)	1,574 (1.6%)	2,128 (2.2%)
Total	87,375	106,118	96,807	99,421	98,527

=== Language ===
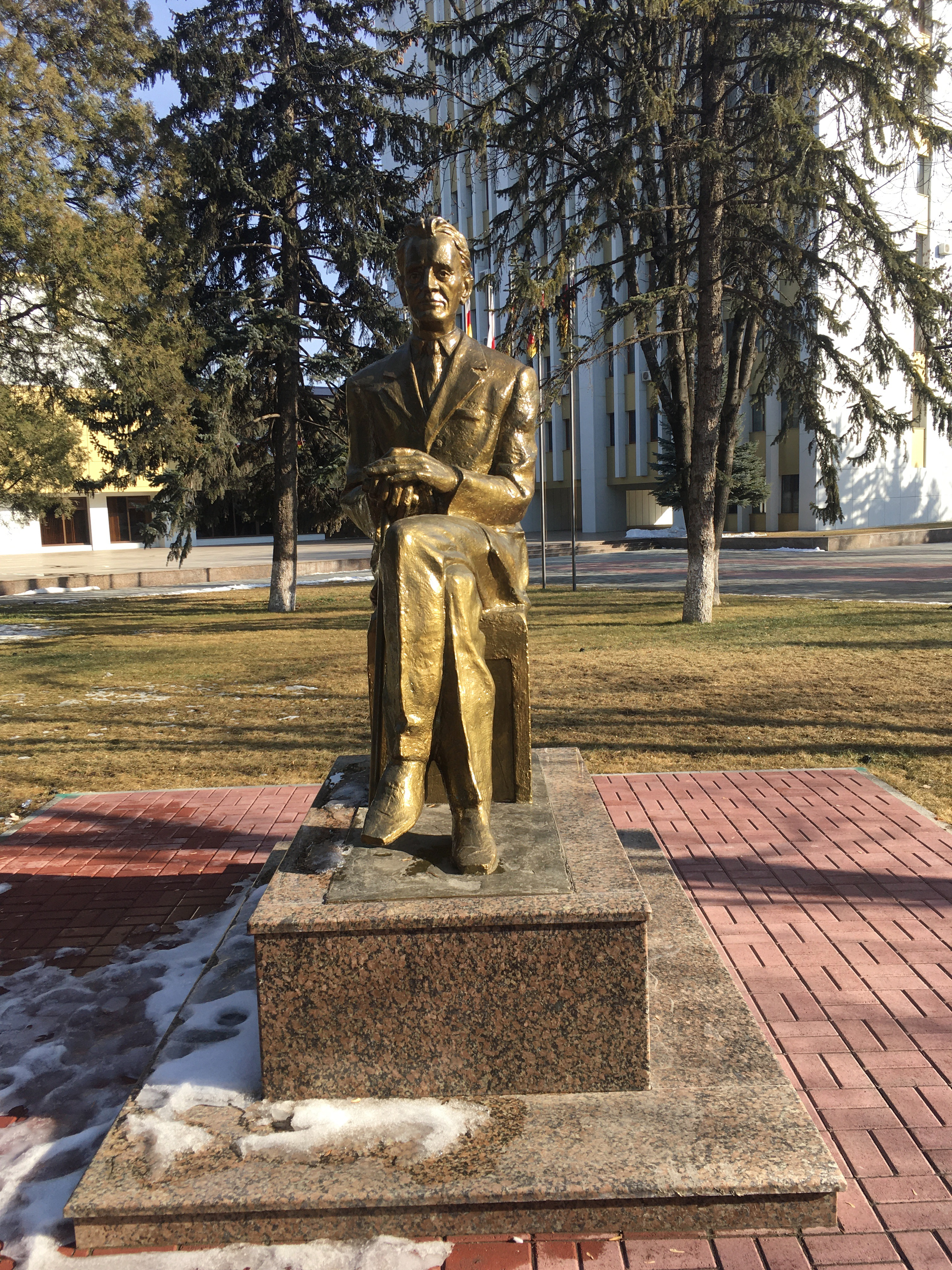
Statue in Tskinvali of the linguist Vasily Abaev (1900–2001), major scholar of Ossetian.

Most people in the South Ossetian AO spoke Ossetian, with smaller numbers using Russian and Georgian; all three were official languages of the region. Though Georgian was the language of the Georgian SSR, of which South Ossetia was part, most people in the South Ossetian AO did not speak the language; as late as 1989, only 14 per cent knew Georgian, and it was a proposal in August 1989 to make Georgian the only official language of public use that instigated the independence movement. Originally written in Cyrillic, Ossetian was switched to a Latin-based script in 1923, as part of the Latinization campaign of the Soviet Union. This was abandoned in 1938, with nearly every Latinized language switching to a Cyrillic script. Ossetian and Abkhaz were the only exceptions; both used a Georgian script (only in South Ossetia; North Ossetia used Cyrillic). This policy lasted until 1953 when South Ossetia abandoned the Georgian script for a Cyrillic-based one.

== See also ==
- Administration of South Ossetia
- South Ossetian Regional Committee of the Communist Party of the Soviet Union
- North Ossetian Autonomous Oblast
- North Ossetian Autonomous Soviet Socialist Republic

== Bibliography ==
- Birch, Julian (1996), "The Georgian/South Ossetian territorial and boundary dispute", in Wright, John F.R.; Goldenberg, Suzanne; Schofield, Richard (eds.), Transcaucasian Boundaries, London: UCL Press Limited, pp. 150–189, ISBN 1-85728-234-5
- Broers, Laurence (June 2009), "'David and Goliath' and 'Georgians in the Kremlin': a post-colonial perspective on conflict in post-Soviet Georgia", Central Asian Survey, 28 (2): 99–18, doi:10.1080/02634930903034096, S2CID 144297310
- Cornell, Svante E. (2001), Small Nations and Great Powers: A Study of Ethnopolitical Conflict in the Caucasus, London: Curzon Press, ISBN 978-0-70-071162-8
- George, Julie A. (2009), The Politics of Ethnic Separatism in Russia and Georgia, New York City: Palgrave Macmillan, ISBN 978-1-349-37825-8
- Hewitt, George (2013), Discordant Neighbours: A Reassessment of the Georgian-Abkhazian and Georgian-South Ossetian Conflicts, Leiden, The Netherlands: Brill, ISBN 978-9-00-424892-2
- Jones, Stephen F. (October 1988), "The Establishment of Soviet Power in Transcaucasia: The Case of Georgia 1921–1928", Soviet Studies, 40 (4): 616–639, doi:10.1080/09668138808411783
- Kolossov, Vladimir; O'Loughlin, John (2011), "Violence in the Caucasus: Economic Insecurities and Migration in the "De Facto" States of Abkhazia and South Ossetia", Eurasian Geography and Economics, 52 (5): 1–24, doi:10.2747/1539-7216.52.5.1 (inactive 12 July 2025)
- Marshall, Alex (2010), The Caucasus Under Soviet Rule, New York City: Routledge, ISBN 978-0-41-541012-0
- Martin, Terry (2001), The Affirmative Action Empire: Nations and Nationalism in the Soviet Union, 1923–1939, Ithaca, New York: Cornell University Press, ISBN 978-0-80-143813-4
- Saparov, Arsène (2015), From Conflict to Autonomy in the Caucasus: The Soviet Union and the making of Abkhazia, South Ossetia and Nagorno Karabakh, New York City: Routledge, ISBN 978-0-41-565802-7
- Souleimanov, Emil (2013), Understanding Ethnopolitical Conflict: Karabakh, South Ossetia, and Abkhazia Wars Reconsidered, London: Palgrave Macmillan
- Suny, Ronald Grigor (1994), The Making of the Georgian Nation (Second ed.), Bloomington, Indiana: Indiana University Press, ISBN 978-0-25-320915-3
- Zürcher, Christoph (2007), The Post-Soviet Wars: Rebellion, Ethnic Conflict, and Nationhood in the Caucasus, New York City: New York University Press, ISBN 978-0-81-479709-9
