= Georgian–Ossetian conflict =

1989–present conflict in the South Caucasus

- Part of Dissolution of the Soviet Union, and post-Soviet conflicts
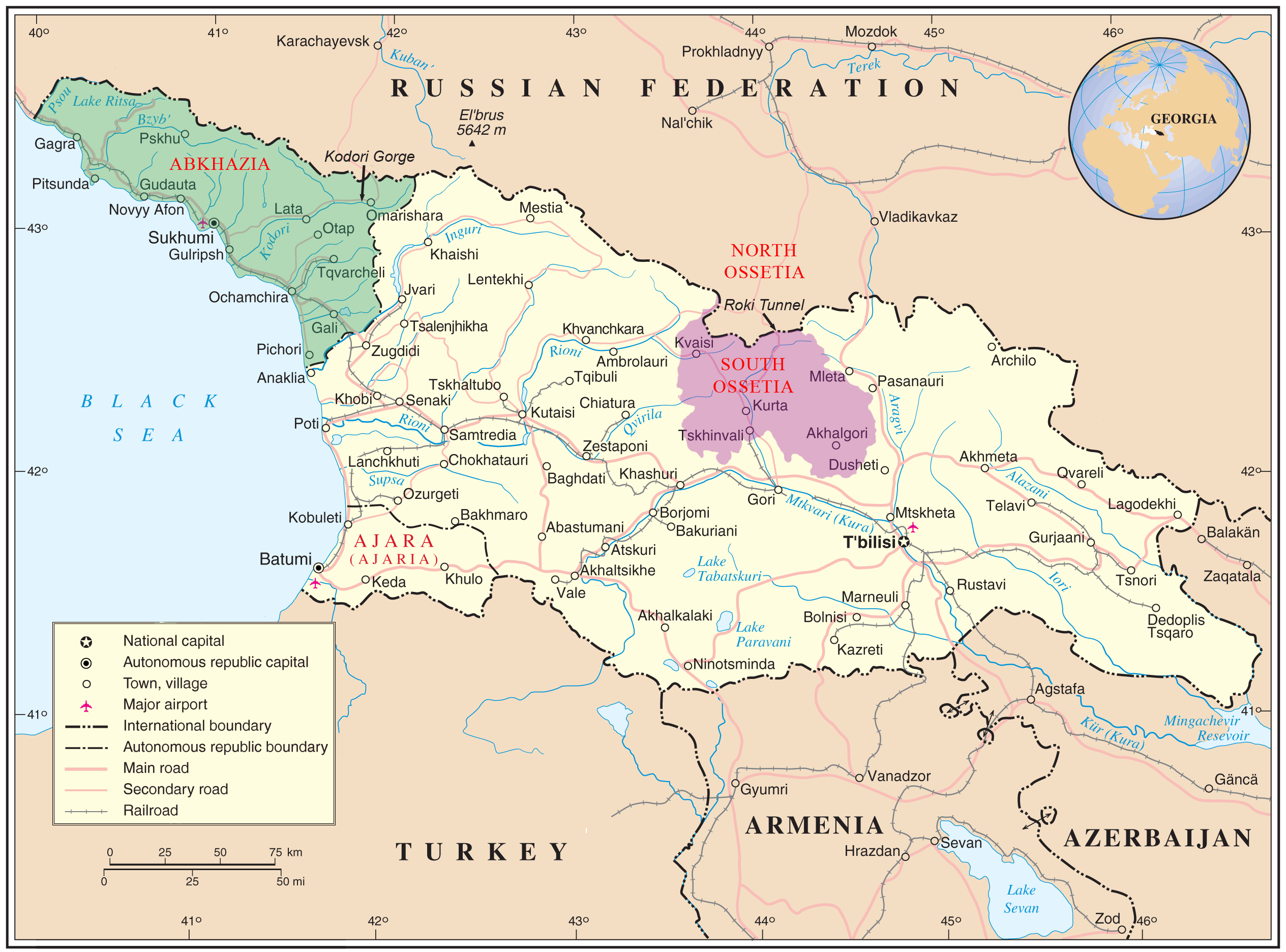
- Location of South Ossetia (purple) within Georgia
Date	10 November 1989 – present
Location	South Ossetia, Georgia
Status	Ongoing; frozen conflict

Belligerents
Georgia (Note: Georgian SSR before 1990)	South Ossetia (Note: South Ossetian Autonomous Oblast before 1990); Russia

The Georgian–Ossetian conflict is an ethno-political conflict over Georgia's former autonomous region of South Ossetia, which evolved in 1989 and developed into a war in 1991–1992. Despite a declared ceasefire and numerous peace efforts, the conflict, involving Georgia, Russia and self-proclaimed republic of South Ossetia, remained unresolved. In August 2008, military tensions and clashes erupted into the Russo-Georgian War. Since then, South Ossetia has been under de facto Russian control.

== Origins of the conflict ==
=== Background ===
The term "South Ossetia" first appeared during the 19th century. Throughout antiquity, the territory of South Ossetia was part of a region of Shida Kartli within the Georgian kingdom of Iberia. In the Middle Ages, the territory was disputed between various Georgian principalities and kingdoms before all of them were unified in the Kingdom of Georgia by 1008. During this period, the territory was part of the Duchy of Kartli. The migration of Alan-Ossetians to the region is believed to be connected to the fall of Kingdom of Alania in the North Caucasus in 13th and 14th centuries to the Mongols and later to Timur's armies. They retreated into the mountains of the central Caucasus and gradually started moving south, across the Caucasus Mountains into the Kingdom of Georgia. (Note: Coene, page 151) The territory of South Ossetia became part of the Kingdom of Kartli after the collapse of the Kingdom of Georgia, and it was held by the aristocratic Georgian Machabeli family, becoming known as Samachablo ("Land of the Machabeli"). In the 17th century, under pressure from the Kabardian princes, Ossetians started a second wave of migration from the North Caucasus to the Kingdom of Kartli. During this time, the Ossetians began to form their settlements in Samachablo; however, they were still outnumbered by native Georgians. In the 19th century, Georgian kingdoms and principalities were incorporated into the Russian Empire, and Ossetian migration to Georgian areas continued throughout the 19th and 20th centuries. The term "South Ossetia" appeared during this period, its first documented use dating to the 19th century. Until then, "North Ossetia" was referred to simply as Ossetia, and "South Ossetia" as Kartli or Samachablo. The term "South Ossetia" became widespread only after the South Ossetian Autonomous Oblast was established within the Georgian Soviet Socialist Republic by the Soviet administration under pressure from Kavburo (the Caucasian Bureau of the Central Committee of the Russian Communist Party) in 1922.

=== Early years of the Soviet Union ===
The conflict between Georgians and Ossetians dates back until at least 1918. In the aftermath of the Russian Revolution, the Democratic Republic of Georgia declared independence (26 May 1918) under the Mensheviks, while the Bolsheviks took control of Russia. Georgians suppressed a Bolshevik rebellion in present-day South Ossetia with great severity in 1918 and in the next year outlawed the National Soviet of South Ossetia. In June 1920, a Russian-sponsored Ossetian force attacked the Georgian Army and People's Guard. The Georgians responded vigorously and defeated the insurgents, with several Ossetian villages being burnt down and 20,000 Ossetians displaced in Soviet Russia. Eight months later, the Red Army successfully invaded Georgia and the South Ossetian Autonomous Oblast was created. Some believe that the Bolsheviks granted this autonomy to the Ossetians in exchange for their (Bolshevik) loyalty in fighting the Democratic Republic of Georgia and favouring local separatists, since this area had never been a separate entity prior to the Red Army invasion.

=== Late years of the Soviet Union ===
To counter pro-independence movements in the constituent Soviet republics, the Soviet government under Mikhail Gorbachev adopted a policy of supporting separatist entities within these republics to pressure them into remaining in the Soviet Union. In April 1990, a law on the "Delimitation of Powers" was passed by the USSR Supreme Soviet, which equalized the rights of autonomies with those of the union republics. This meant that they could participate in negotiations on the New Union Treaty, which many union republics rejected. Gorbachev warned Georgia that if it tried to leave the "brotherly union", it would face problems in the regions on its own territory. An anti-Georgian sentiment began to grow in South Ossetia and Abkhazia with clandestine and open support from Moscow. Ossetian and Abkhaz separatists began to voice demands against Georgia and received arms and financial assistance from the Kremlin.

The Kremlin encouraged Ossetian separatism to undermine stability in Georgia and weaken its national independence movement. It fanned the flames of separatism to undermine Georgia's independence and assert control over the strategically important South Caucasus. South Ossetia's territory cuts through historically Georgian lands. Its separation would wreak havoc on Georgia's territorial integrity, communications, and economy.

In the late 1980s, the Ossetian nationalist organization Adamon Nikhas ("Voice of the People") was created. On 10 November 1989, the South Ossetian Supreme Soviet asked the Supreme Soviet of the Georgian Soviet Socialist Republic for the status of the region to be upgraded to that of an autonomous republic. However, this application was rejected on 16 November. On 23 November 1989, Georgians organized a mass protest in Tskhinvali to oppose separatist tendencies.

South Ossetia declared its sovereignty on 20 September 1990. In October 1990, the Georgian parliamentary elections were boycotted by South Ossetia, which held elections to its own parliament in December of the same year. On 11 December 1990, the Georgian Supreme Council passed a bill that abolished South Ossetia's autonomous status to prevent separatism. Russia intervened, and a state of emergency was declared in South Ossetia.

On 4 May 1991, the South Ossetian Parliament declared its intention to separate from Georgia and unite with North Ossetia, which was located within the borders of the Russian Federation.

== Post-Soviet timeline ==
=== 1991–1992 South Ossetia War ===
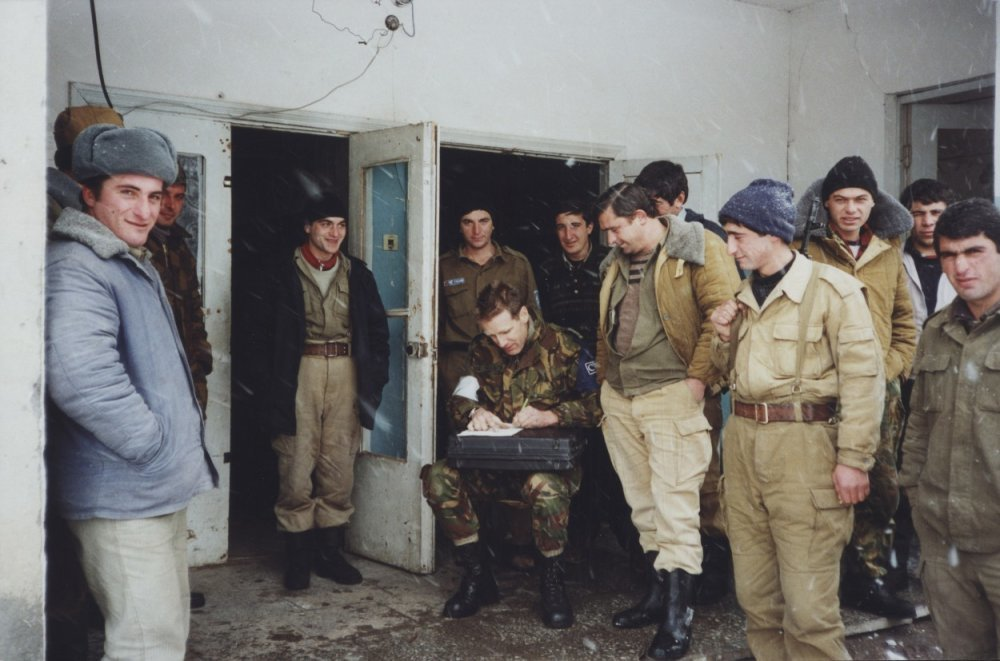
Dutch Major H.W. Verzijl of the OSCE mission monitoring a Georgian military post in South Ossetia in 1996

Amidst rising ethnic tensions, war broke out when Georgian police forces and paramilitary organizations entered the capital of South Ossetia, Tskhinvali, to restore order. More than 2,000 people are believed to have been killed in the war. The separatists were helped by former Soviet military units, who by now had come under Russian command. Approximately 100,000 Ossetians fled Georgia proper and South Ossetia, while 23,000 Georgians left South Ossetia. A ceasefire agreement (the Sochi Agreement) was reached on 24 June 1992. While it ended the war, it did not deal with the status of South Ossetia. A Joint Control Commission for Georgian–Ossetian Conflict Resolution and peacekeeping force, composed of Russian, Georgian and Ossetian troops, was set up. The Ossetian de facto government controlled the region independently from Tbilisi. The JPKF's activities were mainly concentrated in the Conflict Zone, which included an area within a 15 km radius from Tskhinvali.

The separatists retained control over the districts of Tskhinvali, Java, Znauri and parts of Akhalgori. The Tbilisi central government controlled the rest of Akhalgori and the Georgian villages in the Tskhinvali district.

Map of South Ossetia after the war, showing territories under Georgian and under South Ossetian separatist control

=== 1992–2003 ===
In 1996, the Ergneti market was opened and soon became the place where Georgians and South Ossetians traded. In 1996, Lyudvig Chibirov won the presidential elections in South Ossetia. A memorandum on "Measures for providing security and confidence building" was signed in Moscow on 16 May 1996, which was regarded as the first step towards a rapprochement between Georgia and the separatists of South Ossetia. This was followed up by several meetings between the President of Georgia, Eduard Shevardnadze, and the de facto President of South Ossetia, Lyudvig Chibirov. They met in Vladikavkaz in 1996, in Java in 1997, and in Borjomi in 1998. These resulted in some positive developments as the talks about IDP return, economic development, a political solution to the issues, and the protection of the population in the conflict zone.

There was no military confrontation for twelve years. While the peace process was frozen, Ossetians and Georgians engaged in lively exchanges and uncontrolled trade. The unresolved conflict encouraged development of such illegal activities as kidnapping, drug-trafficking and arms trading. Up to the end of 2003, a number of law enforcement officials from South Ossetia and Georgia proper allegedly were participating in criminal economic activities. Authorities on both sides reportedly cooperated to profit from illegal trade, as did Russian customs and peacekeeping troops.

== Timeline before 2008 ==
=== 2004 clashes ===
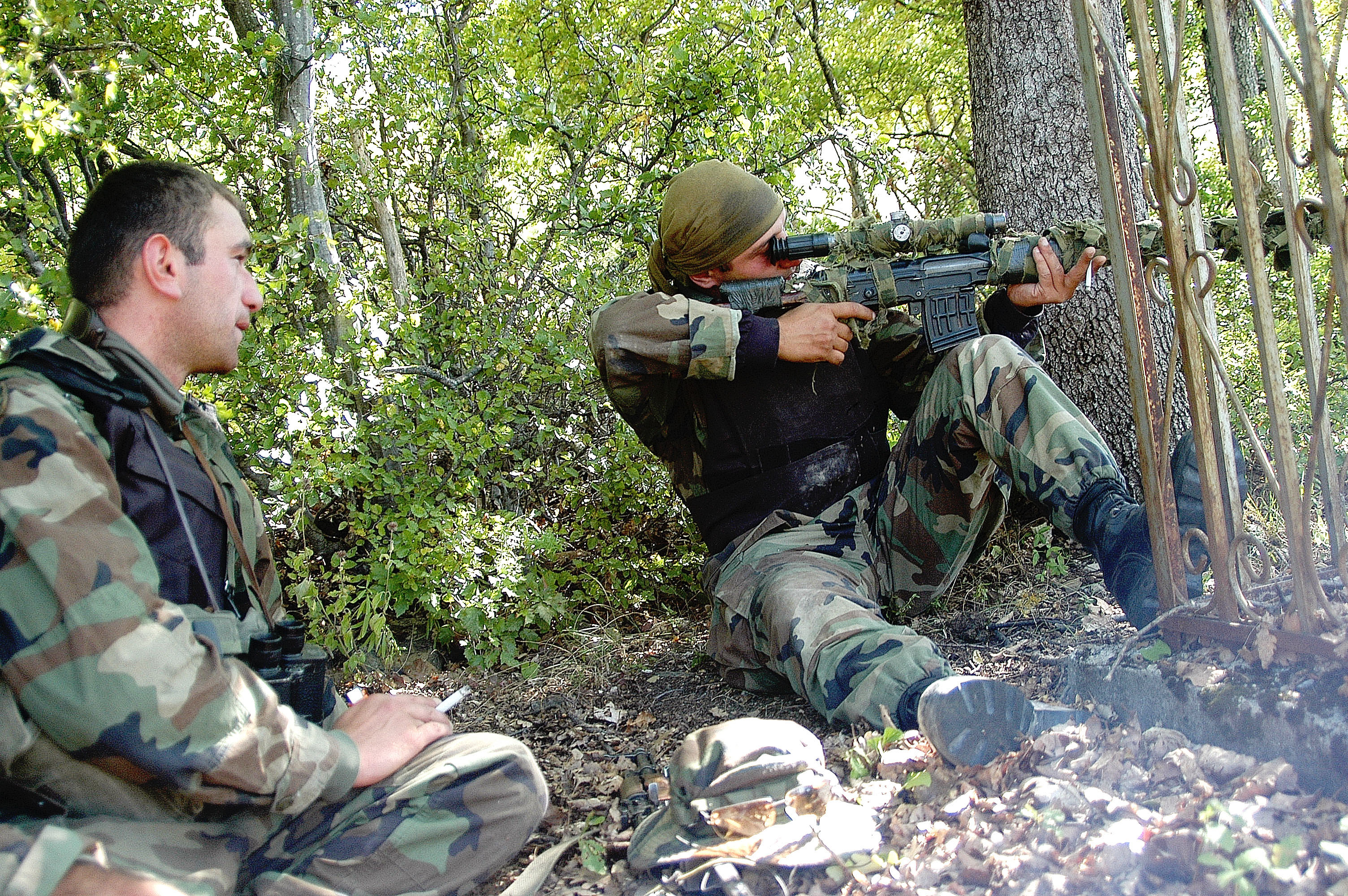

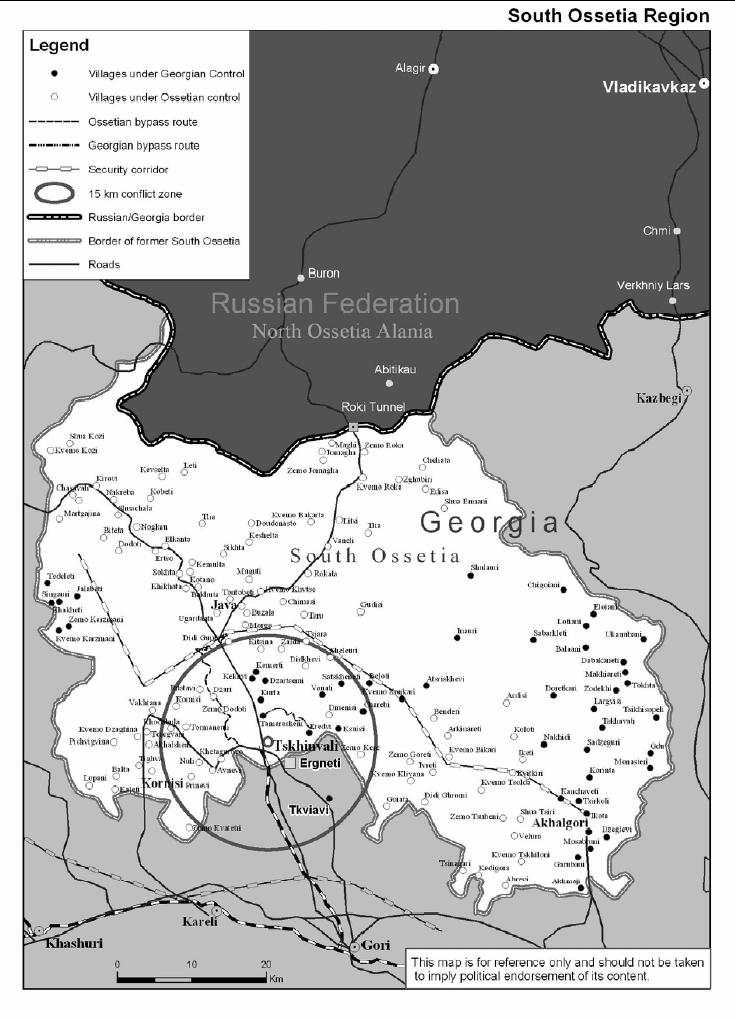
Detailed map of South Ossetia showing the secessionist and Georgian-controlled territories, November 2004

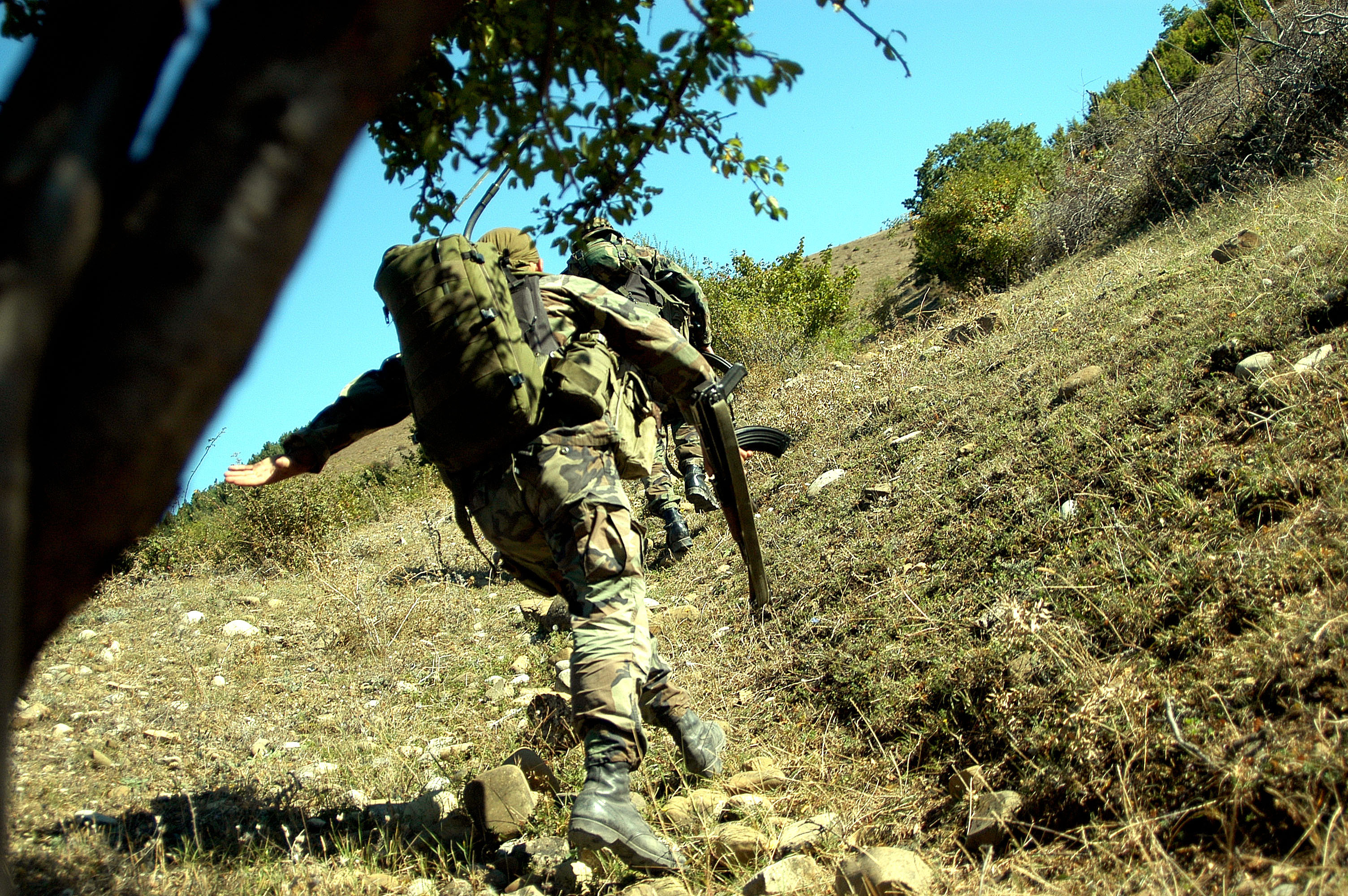
Soldiers of the 13th "Shavnabada" Light Infantry Battalion of the Georgian Army charging up a hill where Ossetian rebels were entrenched

When Mikheil Saakashvili was elected president in 2004, his goal was to return the breakaway regions of Georgia to central control.

Following the success in Adjara, President Mikheil Saakashvili's government turned their attention to South Ossetia.

In June, Georgia shut down the Ergneti market to prevent the flow of contraband goods, regain the customs revenue and financially weaken the Ossetian separatist government which was relying on smuggling. At the same time, Georgia focused on supporting Ossetian activists like Fagu inspired by the Georgian Kmara to set the stage for the "Ossetian Revolution" against the government of South Ossetia. Tensions caused by anti-smuggling campaign soon led to the military hostilities. Georgia's regional administration began to restore the alternative road to Didi Liakhvi.

On 7 July, Georgian peacekeepers intercepted a Russian convoy. The next day around 50 Georgian peacekeepers were disarmed and detained by the South Ossetian militias. The Georgian peacekeepers captured were all released on 9 July, with three exceptions. On 11 July 2004, Georgian president Saakashvili said the "crisis in South Ossetia is not a problem between Georgians and Ossetians. This is a problem between Georgia and Russia."

On 5 August 2004, Russian State Duma issued an official statement concerning the aggravation of situation around South Ossetia and Abkhazia in connection "with political actions of Georgian authorities". The statement warned that Russia could get involved in the conflict and would take "appropriate actions in case the lives of Russian citizens were jeopardized". Hundreds of Russian volunteers, mainly Cossacks, stated their readiness to "protect the people of South Ossetia" should the conflict escalate any further.

The tensions increased on the night of 10–11 August, when Georgian and South Ossetian villages in the area north of Tskhinvali came under fire and civilians were injured. Georgian and South Ossetian members of the JPFK are said to have been involved in the exchange of fire. On 13 August, Georgian Prime Minister Zurab Zhvania and de facto South Ossetian President Eduard Kokoity agreed on a ceasefire, which was breached multiple times by both sides. During the tensions in July and August, 17 Georgians and 5 Ossetians were killed. In emergency sessions of the JCC on 17 and 18 August in Tbilisi and Tskhinvali, the sides debated complex ceasefire proposals and demilitarization projects. At the same time, they expected fighting to resume and used the truce to improve their military positions and strengthen defences. A ceasefire agreement was reached on 19 August.

On 24 August, in an interview broadcast by Imedi television, the chairman of the Georgian parliament's Defense and Security Committee, Givi Targamadze, said that Russian military was prepared to launch a strike into Georgian territory, but the raid was preempted by Saakashvili's decision on 19 August to withdraw Georgian forces from strategic positions in South Ossetia. Targamadze said the Georgian government possessed secretly recorded video of Russian military preparations near the Georgian border.

At a high-level meeting between Georgian Prime Minister Zurab Zhvania and South Ossetian leader Eduard Kokoity on 5 November in Sochi, Russia, an agreement on demilitarization of the conflict zone was reached. Some exchange of fire continued in the zone of conflict after the ceasefire, apparently primarily initiated by the Ossetian side.

=== New peace efforts ===
Saakashvili presented a new vision for resolving the South Ossetian conflict at the Parliamentary Assembly of the Council of Europe (PACE) session in Strasbourg, on 26 January 2005. His proposal included broader forms of autonomy, including a constitutional guarantee of free and directly elected local self-governance. Saakashvili stated that South Ossetia's parliament would have control over issues such as culture, education, social policy, economic policy, public order, organization of local self-governance and environmental protection. At the same time South Ossetia would have a voice in the national structures of government as well, with a constitutional guarantee of representation in the judicial and constitutional-judicial branches and in the Parliament. Georgia would commit to improving the economic and social conditions of South Ossetian inhabitants. Saakashvili proposed a transitional 3-year conflict resolution period, during which time mixed Georgian and Ossetian police forces, under the guidance and auspices of international organizations, would be established and Ossetian forces would gradually be integrated into a united Georgian Armed Force. Saakashvili also said that the international community should play a more significant and visible role in solving this conflict.

Zhvania's premature death in February 2005 was a setback in the conflict resolution.

=== 2006 attack on a Georgian helicopter ===
On 3 September 2006, the South Ossetian forces opened fire at a Georgian MI-8 helicopter carrying Defense Minister of Georgia, Irakli Okruashvili, when it flew over the separatist-held territory. It landed safely in Georgian government-controlled territory. Although the South Ossetian authorities reported that the Georgian helicopter had entered their air space and fired shots at the ground, the Georgians denied the charge that shots had come from the helicopter. The South Ossetian officials confirmed their troops were responsible for the attack, but denied the claim that the aircraft was targeted because of prior intelligence that Okruashvili was on board. "We are not interested in having either Okruashvili or [Georgian president Mikheil] Saakashvili killed, as they are helping us to achieve independence," declared South Ossetian Interior minister Mikhail Mindzayev.

=== 2006 October incident ===
On 31 October 2006, the South Ossetian police reported a skirmish in the Java, Georgia district, in which they killed a group of 4 men. The weapons seized from the group included assault rifles, guns, grenade launchers, grenades and explosive devices. Other items found in the militants' possession included extremist Wahhabi literature, maps of Java district and sets of Russian peacekeeping uniforms. Those findings led the South Ossetian authorities to conclude that the militants were planning to carry out acts of sabotage and terrorist attacks. The South Ossetian authorities identified the men as Chechens from Georgia's Pankisi Gorge. South Ossetia accused Georgia of hiring the Chechen mercenaries to carry out terrorist attacks in the region.

The Georgian side flatly denied its involvement in the incident. Shota Khizanishvili, a spokesperson for the Georgian Interior Ministry, supposed that the incident could be connected to "internal conflicts in South Ossetia".

=== Rival elections of 2006 ===
On 12 November 2006, presidential election and referendum were held in South Ossetia. The separatist-controlled part of the region re-elected Eduard Kokoity as de facto president and voted for independence from Georgia. In the areas under Georgia's control, the Ossetian opposition organized rival polls electing Dmitry Sanakoyev as an alternative president and voted for negotiations with Georgia on a future federal agreement. The pro-Georgian government was never able to draw significant support away from the separatist authorities.

=== Georgia's new initiative ===
On 29 March 2007, the Russian Foreign Ministry warned in a statement that Tbilisi's plan to set up a temporary administrative unit in the part of breakaway South Ossetia would "shatter an already fragile situation". On 10 May 2007, Dmitry Sanakoyev was appointed as head of the Provisional Administrative Entity of South Ossetia by the President of Georgia. The next day, Sanakoyev addressed the Parliament of Georgia, outlining his vision of the conflict resolution plan. In response the South Ossetian separatists enforced mass blockade of Georgian villages in the conflict zone and Kokoity demanded the withdrawal of Georgian special-task troops and South Ossetia's interim government headed by "alternative president" Dmitry Sanakoyev.

On 24 July 2007, Tbilisi held its first state commission to define South Ossetia's status within the Georgian state. Chaired by Georgian Prime Minister Zurab Noghaideli, the commission included Georgian parliamentarians, representatives of the Ossetian community in Georgia and representatives of several Georgian human rights organisations. The talks were held with Sanakoyev's administration.

Sanakoyev's supporters launched a campaign against Kokoity named "Kokoity Fandarast" ("Goodbye Kokoity" in Ossetian language).

=== Tsitelubani missile incident 2007 ===
On 6 August 2007, a missile landed, but did not explode, in the village of Tsitelubani, some 65 km (40 mi) from Tbilisi. Georgian officials said that Russian attack aircraft, an SU-24 Fencer, violated its airspace and fired Raduga Kh-58 anti-radar tactically guided missile. Russia denied the allegations. The group of defense specialists from the United States, Sweden, Latvia and Lithuania stated late on 15 August that the plane flew from Russian to Georgian airspace and back three times.

== Events in 2008 ==
=== Pre-war clashes ===
Events prior to August 2008 are described in 2008 Russo-Georgian diplomatic crisis.

=== 2008 War in South Ossetia ===
Tensions between Georgia and Russia began escalating in April 2008. Fighting began in the night of June 14-15th 2008 when mortar fire and an exchange of fire broke out between South Ossetian and Georgian forces. South Ossetia claimed that mortar fire was launched from Georgian-controlled villages on Tskhinvali, the South Ossetian capital, and that their forces were responding to fire from Georgian forces on the outskirts of the capital. Georgia denied firing the first shot, saying instead that South Ossetia had attacked the Georgian-controlled villages of Ergneti, Nikozi and Prisi. Fighting further escalated when South Ossetian separatists fired upon a Georgian military vehicle on 1 August 2008. The explosion wounded five Georgian peacekeepers. In response, Georgian snipers assaulted the South Ossetian militiamen during the evening. Ossetian separatists began shelling Georgian villages on 1 August, with a sporadic response from Georgian peacekeepers and other troops in the region. Serious incidents happened in the following week after Ossetian attacks on Georgian villages and positions in South Ossetia.

At around 19:00 on 7 August 2008, Saakashvili announced a unilateral ceasefire and no-response order. However, South Ossetian separatists intensified their attacks on Georgian villages located in the South Ossetian conflict zone. Georgian troops returned fire and advanced towards the capital of the self-proclaimed Republic of South Ossetia, Tskhinvali, during the night of 8 August. According to Russian military expert Pavel Felgenhauer, the Ossetians were intentionally provoking the Georgians, so Russia would use the Georgian response as a pretext for premeditated military invasion. According to Georgian intelligence, and several Russian media reports, parts of the regular (non-peacekeeping) Russian Army had already moved to South Ossetian territory through the Roki Tunnel before the Georgian military operation.

The centre of Tskhinvali was reached by 1,500 men of the Georgian ground forces by 10:00 on 8 August. One Georgian diplomat told Kommersant on the same day that by taking control of Tskhinvali they wanted to demonstrate that Georgia wouldn't tolerate killing of Georgian citizens. Russia accused Georgia of aggression against South Ossetia, and launched a large-scale invasion of Georgia under the guise of peacekeeping operation on 8 August. Russian military captured Tskhinvali in five days and expelled Georgian forces. Russia also launched airstrikes against military infrastructure in Georgia. Abkhaz forces opened a second front by attacking the Kodori Gorge, held by Georgia. Russian forces occupied the Georgian cities of Zugdidi, Senaki, Poti and Gori (the last one after the ceasefire was negotiated). Russian Black Sea Fleet blockaded the Georgian coast.

Both during and after the war, South Ossetian forces and irregular militia conducted a campaign of ethnic cleansing against Georgians in South Ossetia, with Georgian villages around Tskhinvali being destroyed after the war had ended. The war displaced 192,000 people, and while many were able to return to their homes after the war, a year later around 30,000 ethnic Georgians remained displaced. In an interview published in Kommersant, Kokoity said he would not allow Georgians to return.

President of France Nicolas Sarkozy negotiated a ceasefire agreement on 12 August 2008. On 17 August, Russian president Dmitry Medvedev announced that Russian forces would begin to pull out of Georgia the following day. Russian forces withdrew from the buffer zones adjacent to Abkhazia and South Ossetia on 8 October and control over them was transferred to the European Union Monitoring Mission in Georgia.

== After the 2008 war ==
On 26 August 2008, Russia officially recognized both South Ossetia and Abkhazia as independent states.

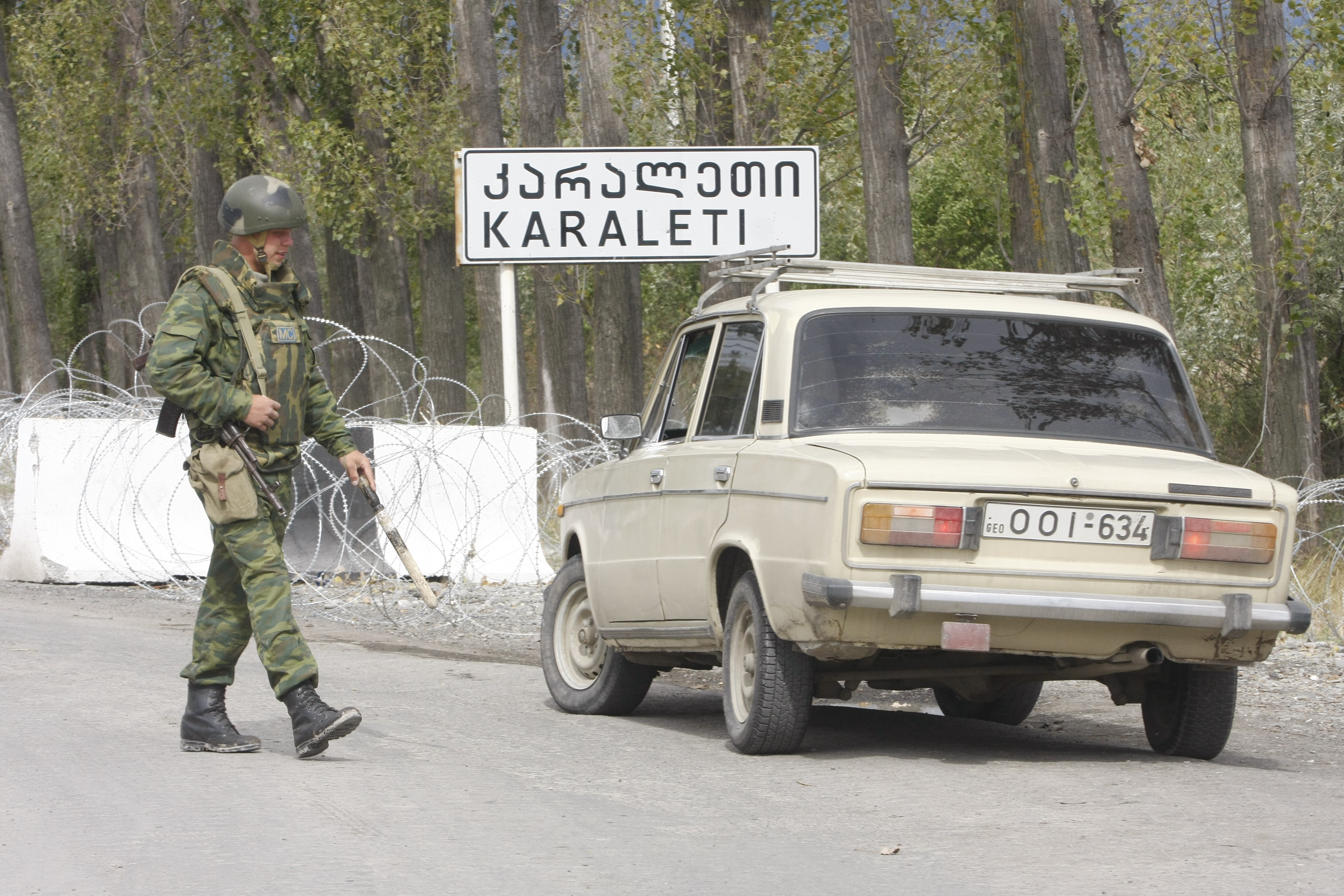
The checkpoint where Georgian policeman Tsotniashvili was shot

On 10 September 2008 a Georgian policeman was fatally wounded at a military checkpoint near Karaleti. He was believed to have been shot from a Russian security zone around 800 meters away. The Russian and South Ossetian army both denied any involvement in the shooting.

In July 2009, the media outlets reported that Georgia and Russia were on the brink of another war as both sides mobilized troops near Ergneti checkpoint.

In 2015, the prosecutor of the International Criminal Court requested authorisation from the court's judges to begin an investigation into the alleged war crimes in relation to the conflict. This case includes alleged crimes committed as part of a campaign to expel ethnic Georgians from South Ossetia as well as attacks on peacekeepers by Georgian and South Ossetian forces.

In 2018 the South Ossetian State Security Committee (KGB) abducted three Georgian citizens and killed one.

In the following years after the 2008 war Russian and Ossetian troops expanded the border into Georgia, evicting ethnic Georgians from their homes.

There have been several proposals on South Ossetia joining Russia following the war. The latest dates back to 2022.

=== 2019 Chorchana-Tsnelisi crisis ===
On 24–25 August 2019, tensions mounted at the administrative boundary line in South Ossetia as the Georgian police erected a checkpoint between the villages of Chorchana and Tsnelisi in response to ongoing Russian–South Ossetian demarcation works. On 29 August, movement of military equipment and personnel was noticed near Chorchana. South Ossetian official Egor Kochiev demanded immediate dismantling of Georgian police checkpoint, otherwise warning that South Ossetia would take "legal measures". Georgian officials responded by saying that Georgia does not accept "the language of ultimatums". The State Security Service of Georgia stated that the checkpoint was erected on Georgian-controlled territory and it is up to Georgian government to decide where to place police checkpoints on Georgian territory. The Ministry of Foreign Affairs of Georgia called on de facto South Ossetian authorities to stop provocations and unlawful demarcation works. On 29 August, South Ossetian officials abruptly left the meeting with Georgian government conducted in the Incident Prevention and Response Mechanism (IPRM) format.

In September, the South Ossetian authorities closed all crossing points with Georgian government-controlled territory, aggravating the humanitarian situation in the region and placing some 2,500 ethnic Georgians remaining in the Akhalgori district at a particular risk.

Representatives of Tbilisi, Moscow and Tskhinvali continued discussing the situation during a series of "technical meetings", but serious security challenges remained. Georgian officials refused to have any talks about placement of police checkpoints on Georgian controlled territory.

=== Present— ===
On 6 November 2023, Russian Federation Border Guards murdered a Georgian civilian and detained another near the de facto border in the vicinity of Kirbali village.

On 22 April 2026, the State Security Service of Georgia arrested a South Ossetian resident on the charges of spying for Russia by collecting information regarding the deployment, forces, and assets of the Georgian law enforcement and the locations of Georgian strategic infrastructure.

As of 2024, four members of the United Nations (UN) recognise South Ossetia as a sovereign state – Russia, Venezuela, Nicaragua and Syria. The Georgian government and all other UN member states regard South Ossetia as sovereign territory of Georgia.

== See also ==
- Abkhazia conflict
- East Prigorodny conflict
- Georgian Civil War
- Georgia–South Ossetia border
- International recognition of Abkhazia and South Ossetia
- Politics of Georgia
- Russo-Georgian War
- South Ossetian independence referendum, 2006
- Transnistria conflict
