= Murder of Tamaz Ginturi =

Killing of Tamaz Ginturi
- Part of Georgian–Ossetian conflict
- Date: November 6, 2023- November 9, 2023
- Victims: (Georgia (country)) Tamaz Ginturi (executed) (Georgia (country)) Levan Dotiashvili
- Perpetrator: Border Service of the Federal Security Service of the Russian Federation

On November 6, 2023, two Georgian citizens, Tamaz Ginturi and Levan Dotiashvili, were attacked by the Border Service of the Federal Security Service of the Russian Federation (FSB) near the border of Georgia and the partially recognized self-proclaimed state of South Ossetia, resulting in the murder of Ginturi and the illegal detention of Dotiashvili, sparking an international diplomatic incident as the event took place on the eve of the planned release of a European Commission report that is to recommend if Georgia should be granted European Union membership candidate status or not.

== Victims ==
Tamaz Ginturi (aged 58) and Levan Dotiashvili (aged 33) were both residents of Kirbali, a village ~500m from the internationally unrecognized South Ossetian-Georgian border. Ginturi was a veteran of the Russo-Georgian War as a member of the Karaleti Special Forces.

== Events ==
The border between South Ossetia and Georgia is manned jointly by the FSB and the South Ossetian State Security Committee (KGB) and have engaged in the practice of "creeping occupation" or "creeping annexation", where, periodically, Russian and South Ossetian forces move the border fence marking the boundary of South Ossetia deeper into Georgian territory a couple dozen meters at a time. Due to this, the border has moved from 500m away from the village, to right on top of it, with South Ossetia "annexing" the church and graveyard just to the north of the village.

Both Ginturi and Dotiashvili lost loved ones in the 2008 war who were buried in the village's cemetery; in Ginturi's case, his father. On November 6, 2023, the pair made an attempt to pay respects in the cemetery when FSB personnel opened fire, shooting Ginturi several times in the chest and back and taking Dotiashvili into custody, sending him to a prison in Tskhinvali. According to Dotiashvili, the Russian forces did not attack when they crossed the border, or paid respects at the cemetery, but rather ambushed the pair on the doorstep to the locked, abandoned, St. George of Lomisi Church where they tried to light a candle for their lost ones. According to residents of Kirbali, Ginturi was not killed instantly, but rather slowly bled to death while Russia border guards prevented anyone from approaching and offering aid.

Immediately after the murder of Ginturi and kidnapping of Dotiashvili, the State Security Service of Georgia (SUS) convened a meeting with Russian representatives and the EU Monitoring Mission. At said meeting, Russian officials agreed to release Dotiashvili and to punish Ginturi's killers. Meanwhile, the Foreign Ministry of South Ossetia stated that Ginturi and Dotiashvili "displayed an extreme level of aggression towards the servicemen of the border guard and posed a threat to their life and health", refusing to apologize for the incident. Additionally, South Ossetian officials reported that Ginturi was killed while attempting to cross the border while intoxicated, a claim rejected by both Georgian and Russian officials, and directly contrary to Dotiashvili's testimony that the pair came under attack while attempting to return to Georgia. Additionally, South Ossetian officials denied any deaths, and stated that one suspect was taken to a hospital in Georgia, which never happened, and that both Ginturi and Dotiashvili were "radical representatives" of Mikheil Saakashvili and that the pair sought to destroy the South Ossetian border and state and called on the Georgian government to recognize South Ossetia as independent to prevent further border incidents.

Dotiashvili would be released and returned to Georgian authorities on November 9, where he was able to testify about the course of events on the incident. He stated that there was a warning shot as the pair attempted to open the door to the church, which resulted in the pair running to their car in an attempt to leave, with Ginturi being killed attempting to drive back to the border. Dotiashvili stated that the Russian personnel instructed him to use Ginturi's phone to call an ambulance and report the incident to local Georgian authorities. Shortly after the Ministry of Internal Affairs of Georgia announced they would be pursuing legal charges on the perpetrators for violating Articles 109 and 143 of the Criminal Code of Georgia on “premeditated murder” and “illegal deprivation of liberty." Georgian Public Defender, Levan Ioseliani, announced on November 29 that his office was actively collecting evidence for the trial.

Ginturi's body was recovered on the same day as his death by local Georgian police and was given a funeral with full military honors on November 11 which was attended by his relatives, friends, fellow villagers, politicians, and human rights activists. Georgian President Salome Zurabishvili attended the funeral and met with Ginturi's family in their home to offer condolences.

On November 12, Russian sources claimed that Ginturi had been attempting to force open the door of the church with an ax and threatened an FSB agent that told him to stop and ignored a warning shot before being killed, in contrast to the testimony of Dotiashvili who stated the pair fled when they heard the warning shot, and that Ginturi was killed in their car.

On November 14, the Georgian Parliament observed a moment of silence for Tamaz Ginturi. At the event, the Speaker of Parliament Shalva Papuashvili stated that "the primary national objective for Georgia and all Georgians is to put an end to the occupation and restore territorial integrity."

== Accounts ==
=== Dotiashvili ===
Ginturi and Dotiashvili crossed the border without incident and paid respects at the local cemetery. When they found the door to the church locked, Ginturi attempted to pry it open with an ax to light a candle for their loved ones. The pair then heard a warning shot and ran back to their car in an effort to leave, only for Ginturi to be shot in the back and chest as Russian border guards had surrounded the pair unbeknownst to them. Dotiashvili was detained. Dotiashvili then was made to call Georgian emergency services to pick up Ginturi's body before being taken to a prison in Tskhinvali.

=== Russia ===
Ginturi and Dotiashvili crossed the border without incident and paid respects at the local cemetery. When they found the door to the church locked, Ginturi attempted to pry it open with an ax. Then a Russian border guard approached the pair and ordered them to stop. Ginturi then threatened the guard who, in turn, fired a warning shot. When Ginturi ignored the warning, he was killed and Dotiashvili was arrested and sent to a prison in Tskhinvali.

=== South Ossetia ===
Ginturi and Dotiashvili, agents of the former Georgian President Mikhail Saakashvili, attempted to drunkenly cross the border with an ax on a mission to destroy border installations, and were repelled after a short fire fight by Russian border guards, with one of the two being seriously wounded and taken to a Georgian hospital.

== Reactions ==
- Girchi — More Freedom chairman Zurab Japaridze criticized the ruling Georgian Dream party that "[The murder] is the result of Georgian Dream's policy of supposedly having peace in the country. We can all see what kind of peace there is in reality. In any case, as long as we are weak, as long as our policy is to not antagonize Russia and to be on our knees, this will continue as usual."
- (European Union) The European Parliament passed a resolution on November 23, 2023, reiterating their unwavering support Georgia's sovereignty and territorial integrity within its internationally recognized borders, condemning the murder and kidnapping, and called for increased sanctions on South Ossetia in response to the incident.
- Georgian Dream leader Mamuka Mdinaradze denounced efforts by the opposition to politicize the incident stating that “Today, there are attempts to exploit this tragedy by those who left us with this burdensome legacy, those who led the Georgian military into war (Mikhail Saakashvili)."
- Georgian Dream chairman Irakli Kobakhidze stated the incident demonstrates "the most burdensome consequence of the treacherous policies of the former government (of Mikhail Saakashvili), which we encounter daily."
- Georgian Dream MP Irakli Kadagishvili stated that "We’ve encountered isolated, tragic incidents. However, there are individuals advocating for heightened confrontation. Escalating the situation could trigger unmanageable developments. Can anyone from the present opposition take responsibility for this? The events in Kirbali are an outcome of their past actions [when they were in power].” again blaming the incident on the government of Mikhail Saakashvili.
- (Russia) Russian Deputy Foreign Minister Mikhail Galuzin condemned calling the incident a "murder" and blamed the incident on "the aggression of Georgia under the leadership of Saakashvili against the population of South Ossetia and Russian peacekeepers."
- Georgian President Salome Zurabishvili called the murder “a brutal attack on Georgian statehood.”
- (Georgia (country)) Georgian Prime Minister Irakli Garibashvili stated that the murder demonstrated “the difficult security situation on the ground and speaks of the dire consequences of the occupation.”
- United States Mission to the Organization for Security and Cooperation in Europe ambassador Michael R. Carpenter issued a statement condemning the killing and called on Russia to withdraw its forces from the conflict zone in accordance with the 2008 ceasefire.

== See also ==
- 2012 Moldova security zone incident
- Murder of Archil Tatunashvili
