= Murder of Archil Tatunashvili =

2018 crime in South Ossetia

Killing of Archil Tatunashvili
- Part of Georgian–Ossetian conflict
- Date: February 22, 2018- February 23, 2018
- Victims: (Georgia (country)) Archil Tatunashvili (executed) (Georgia (country)) Levan Kutashvili (Georgia (country)) Ioseb Pavliashvili
- Perpetrator: South Ossetian State Security Committee
- Accused: (South Ossetia) Davit Gurtsiev (South Ossetia) Alik Tamboev
- Charges: Deprivation of liberty, murder
- Verdict: Guilty in absentia

On February 22, 2018, the South Ossetian State Security Committee (KGB) abducted three Georgian citizens: Archil Tatunashvili, Levan Kutashvili and Ioseb Pavliashvili. Officials declared Tatunashvili dead on February 23, sparking an international diplomatic incident just before the 2018 Russian presidential election.

== Archil Tatunashvili ==
Archil Tatunashvili was a former soldier in the Georgian Army. He was born in the village of Kanchavetti in the Akhalgori Municipality in the Tskhinvali Region but was forced to flee following the ethnic cleansing of Georgians in South Ossetia. In the years before the incident he had secured a pass from South Ossetia's KGB to freely travel through the de facto Republic and had crossed the border several times with no problems to visit his elderly grandmother. Tatunashvili had served in the 300 man strong Georgian peacekeeping battalion during the Iraq war and was deployed there during the Russo-Georgian war.

== Murder ==
Tatunashvili was kidnapped by Russian forces in Akhalgori near the de facto border with Georgia on February 22, 2018. According to his family, he had traveled across the border into South Ossetia to visit his old family home. He was kidnapped alongside two other Georgian civilians: Levan Kutashvili and Ioseb Pavliashvili. He would be declared dead by South Ossetian officials on February 23. The Government of South Ossetia initially refused to return his body causing his family to personally petition Georgian Prime Minister Giorgi Kvirikashvili to increase pressure. Shortly afterwards Kvirikashvili met with Ilia II of Georgia, imploring him to ask Patriarch Kirill of Moscow to directly confront Vladimir Putin on the issue of returning the body.

According to the South Ossetian government, Tatunashvili was seeking to destroy a border instillation to discredit Russia's foreign policy ahead of the 2018 Russian presidential election and was detained without incident, but during his transfer to a detention cell he had lunged for a guard's gun, lost his balance and fell down a flight of stairs before being taken to a hospital where he died of "heart failure."

His body was returned to Georgia on March 20, in a transfer facilitated by the Red Cross. His body had all its internal organs removed and showed extensive signs of torture with over 100 different wounds across his body. The South Ossetian government refused requests from both the Georgian Government and the European Union Monitoring Mission in Georgia to see the body before the transfer.

=== Aftermath ===
After Tatunashvili's body was recovered he was buried at the Mukhatgverdi military cemetery near Tbilisi with full military honors. Kutashvili and Pavliashvili where released from South Ossetian prison on February 24 but where initially not permitted to return to Georgia. The pair where eventually allowed to cross the border on March 11.

On December 16, 2020, the Mtskheta District court charged two South Ossetian security officers, Davit Gurtsiev and Alik Tamboev to life in prison in absentia for the murder of Tatunashvili. The pair have had an outstanding warrant for their arrest from Interpol since September 2018 and are sanctioned under the Otkhozoria–Tatunashvili List.

== Reactions ==
On his would be 38th birthday in 2021, Georgian foreign minister David Zalkaliani commemorated Archil as a "an example of bravery and heroism" stating also that the Georgian government was seeking some method of charging his murderers for their crime. That same day Akhalgori Regional Governor Nugzar Tinikashvili laid a wreath on his grave with a representative from the Ministry for Reconciliation and Civic Equality alongside speaker of parliament Gia Volski, intelligence director Irakli Beraia, and MPs Pridon Injia and David Zilpimiani. Georgian military officials have also visited his tomb, including a February 22, 2026, visit by Deputy Commander of the Defense Forces and Chief of the General Staff Joni Tatunashvili and Chief Sergeant of the Aviation and Air Defense Command Revaz Mtsituri.

The United States expressed its "deep concern" in the death of Tatunashvili at the hands of Russian forces and offered condolences to his family and reiterated their fully support of Georgia's international borders, and rejecting the Russian occupation of Abkhazia and South Ossetia, urging Russia to fulfill its commitments to the 2008 ceasefire agreement and withdraw to pre-conflict positions across the border.

The United Kingdom's ambassador to Georgia, Justin McKenzie Smith, also expressed that he was "deeply concerned by the death of [a] Georgian citizen." Stating that the British government expected the government of South Ossetia to engage in a transparent investigation, release the other two kidnapped Georgians, as well as allow international human rights and humanitarian institutions into the breakaway republic while reaffirming Georgia's territorial integrity.

The European Union issued a statement calling the death of Tatunashvili as "a source of grave concern" and called for the release of the other two detained Georgians. Similarly, the European Union Monitoring Mission in Georgia also issued a statement calling for further communication with the Russian side regarding the death, and stating it was "of paramount importance" that Russia ensure "all necessary documentation is exchanged to ascertain the cause of death."

President of the Council of Europe's Congress of Local and Regional Authorities, Gudrun Mosler-Törnström, denounced the killing: “I would like to join with the entire international community in expressing my outrage and sorrow at this tragic event” and reaffirmed the Congress' recognition of Georgia's borders.

Russian foreign ministry spokeswoman Maria Zakharova denied that the murder had any impact on Georgian relations although it was an "regrettable incident" that was attributed to Mikheil Saakashvili and that any claims Russian forces where shifting the border where "false information" and called on Georgia to recognize the independence of South Ossetia.

Amnesty International called for Russian officials to "ensure a thorough, prompt and impartial investigation into the death of [Tatunashvili]" and that his detention and death violated Article 6(1) of the International Covenant on Civil and Political Rights.

== See also ==
- Murder of Tamaz Ginturi
