= Frozen conflict =

Armed conflict ending with no peace treaty

In international relations, a frozen conflict is a situation in which active armed conflict has been brought to an end, but no peace treaty or other political framework resolves the conflict to the satisfaction of the combatants. Therefore, legally the conflict can start again at any moment, creating an environment of insecurity and instability.

The term has been commonly used for post-Soviet conflicts, but it has also often been applied to other extended and unresolved territorial disputes. The de facto situation that emerges may or may not match the official position asserted by either party to the conflict. For example, in the Division of Korea, both North Korea and South Korea officially assert claims to the entire peninsula; however, there exists a well-defined border between the two countries' areas of control.

Frozen conflicts sometimes result in partially recognized states. For example, the Republic of South Ossetia, a product of the frozen Georgian–Ossetian conflict, is recognized by eight other states, including five UN member states; the other three of these entities are partially-recognized states themselves.

Since aggressors are not defeated, frozen conflicts can be seen as appeasement and rewarding aggression. The Status Quo of Aggression could also be the result of an impasse due to matching military might and can trigger hesitance to take immediate military action, especially action against another great power.

== Current frozen conflicts ==
=== Africa ===
==== Western Sahara ====
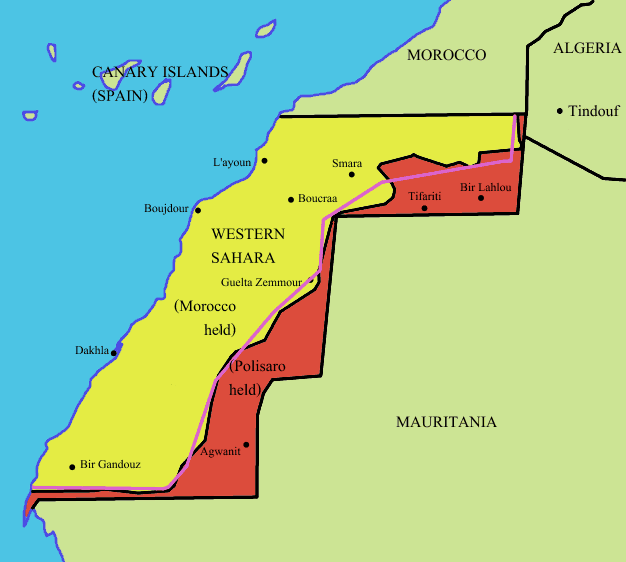
Status quo in Western Sahara since 1991 cease-fire: most under Moroccan control (Southern Provinces), with inner Polisario-controlled areas forming the Sahrawi Arab Democratic Republic.

The Western Sahara conflict has been largely frozen since a ceasefire in 1991, although various disturbances such as the Independence Intifada have broken out since then. Control of the territory of Western Sahara remains divided between the Kingdom of Morocco and the Polisario Front.

=== Asia ===
==== Abkhazia and South Ossetia ====
The Abkhaz–Georgian conflict and Georgian–Ossetian conflict have led to the creation of two largely unrecognized states within the internationally recognized territory of Georgia. The 1991–92 South Ossetia War and the 1992–93 War in Abkhazia, followed by the Russo-Georgian War of August 2008, have left the Russian-backed republics of South Ossetia and Abkhazia in de facto control of the South Ossetia and Abkhazia regions in north and northwest Georgia. These interventions have been interpreted as a Kremlin strategy to destabilize other post-Soviet states and extend Russia's sphere of influence.

==== Cyprus ====
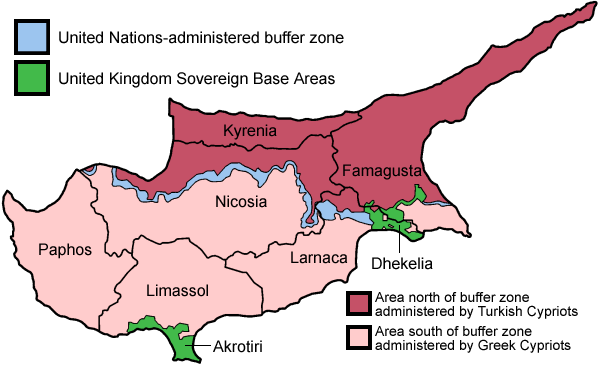
A map of divided Cyprus

The Cyprus dispute has been frozen since 1974. The northern part of Cyprus is under the de facto control of the Turkish Republic of Northern Cyprus, but this is not recognized internationally except by Turkey.

==== Kashmir ====
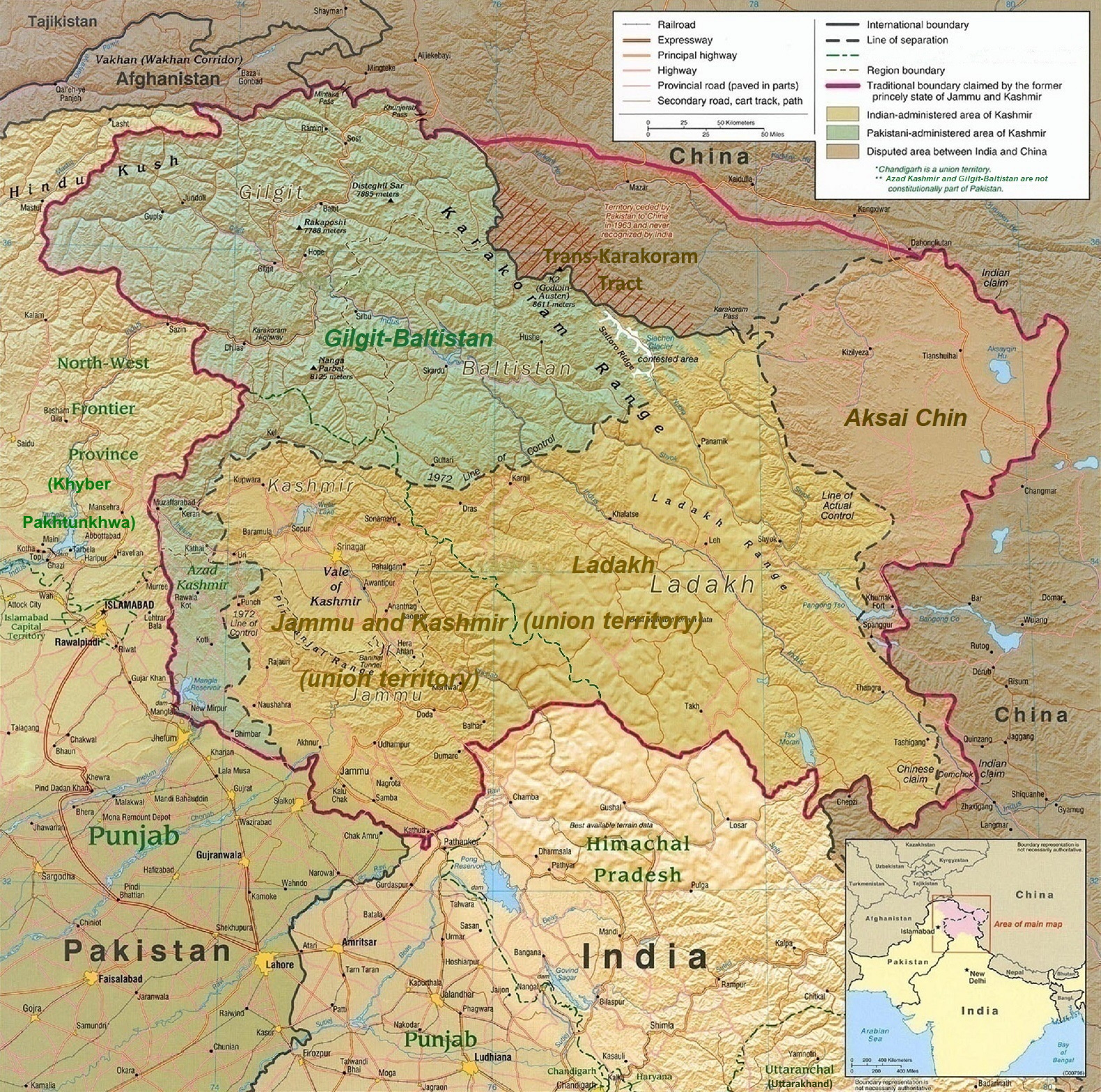
India claims the entire erstwhile princely state of Jammu and Kashmir based on an instrument of accession signed in 1947. Pakistan claims Jammu and Kashmir based on its majority Muslim population, whereas China claims the Shaksam Valley and Aksai Chin.

India and Pakistan have fought at least three wars over the disputed region of Kashmir, in 1947, 1965, and 1999. India claims the entire area of the former princely state of Jammu & Kashmir on the basis of its ruler formally acceding to India amidst a Pakistani invasion after partition, and administers approximately 43% of it. Pakistan has also claimed it since the partition, based on its majority Muslim population, and controls approximately 37% of the region while encouraging proxy war tactics in Kashmir. The remaining territory is controlled by the People's Republic of China; some of it was occupied during the Sino-Indian War, and some was conferred on the PRC by Pakistan.

==== Korean peninsula ====
The Korean conflict was frozen from 1953, when a ceasefire ended the Korean War. Both the North Korean and South Korean governments claim the entire Korean peninsula, while de facto control is divided along the military demarcation line in the Korean Demilitarized Zone. Both North Korea and South Korea are recognized by the vast majority of other nations, although they do not recognize each other.

==== Mainland China and Taiwan ====
The conflict between Mainland China and Taiwan has been frozen since 1949. No armistice or peace treaty has ever been signed and debate continues as to whether the civil war has legally ended. Officially, both the People's Republic of China (PRC) based in Beijing and the Republic of China (ROC) based in Taipei consider themselves to be the sole legitimate government of the entirety of China. While the latter especially is not recognized by a majority of countries and states internationally, it remains a de facto independent administration in Taiwan and several other islands, and the PRC's de facto administration is in Mainland China, Hong Kong and Macau.

=== Europe ===
==== Kosovo ====
The dispute over the status of Kosovo remains frozen since the end of the Kosovo War, fought in 1998–1999 between Yugoslav forces (the Federal Republic of Yugoslavia) and the ethnically Albanian Kosovo Liberation Army. The Kosovo region has been administered independently by the United Nations Interim Administration Mission in Kosovo since the war. Kosovo unilaterally declared its independence from Serbia in 2008, but it is recognized by 108 UN member states, as Serbia still considers Kosovo part of its territory.

==== Transnistria ====
Since the ceasefire which ended the Transnistria War (1990–1992), the Russian-influenced breakaway republic of Transnistria has controlled the easternmost strip of the territory of Moldova. The republic is internationally unrecognized, and Moldova continues to claim the territory.

== Former frozen conflicts ==
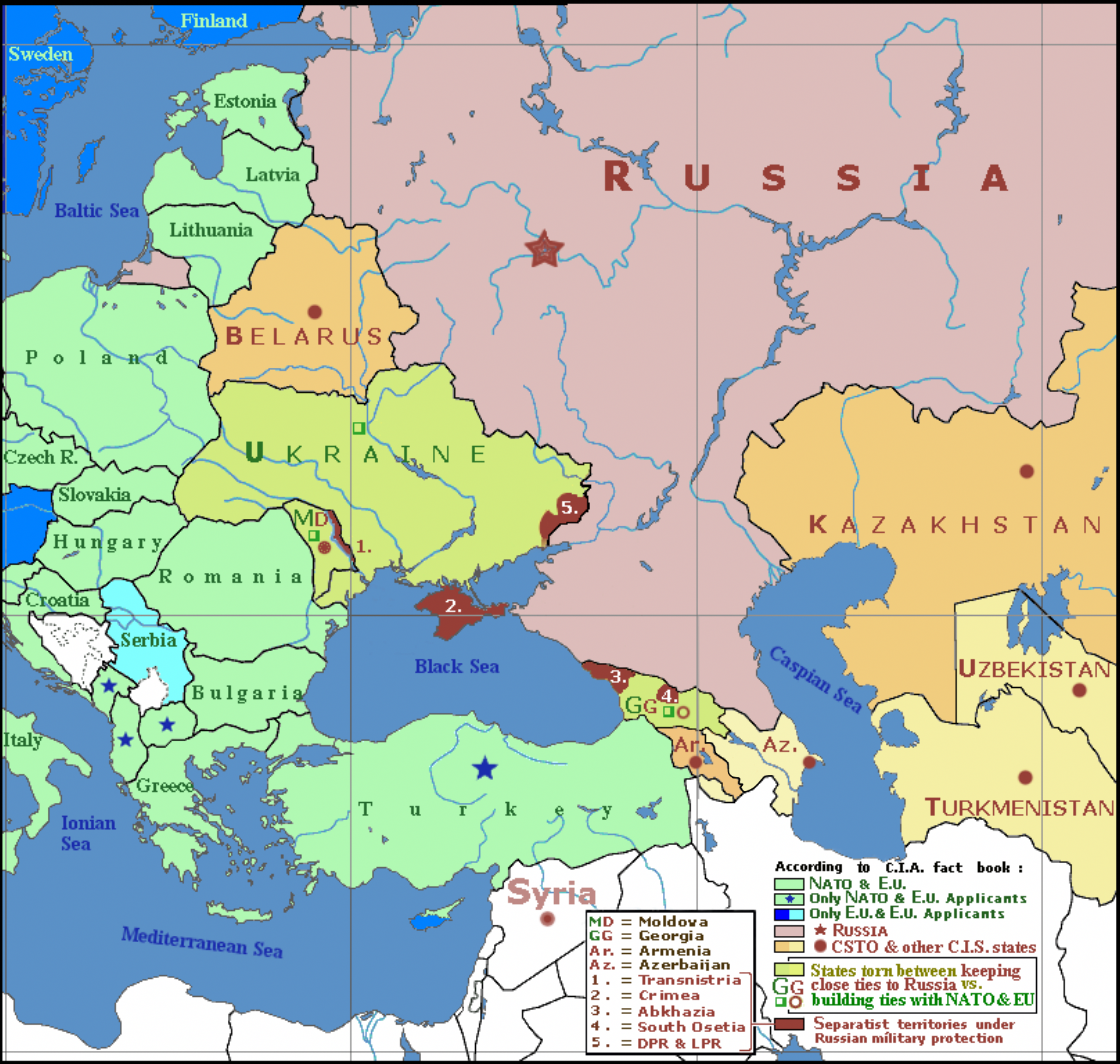
Geopolitics of Eastern Europe and West Asia from 2008 to 2022, showing the frozen conflict zones of Transnistria, Crimea, Abkhazia, South Ossetia, and Donbas (numbered 1–5), as well as Northern Cyprus (lighter region within Cyprus). The Gaza Strip, Israel, Kosovo, and the West Bank also appear on the map, although they are not highlighted. Frozen conflict zones elsewhere in the world do not appear on this map.

=== Israel, Palestine, and the Arab League (Golan Heights) ===
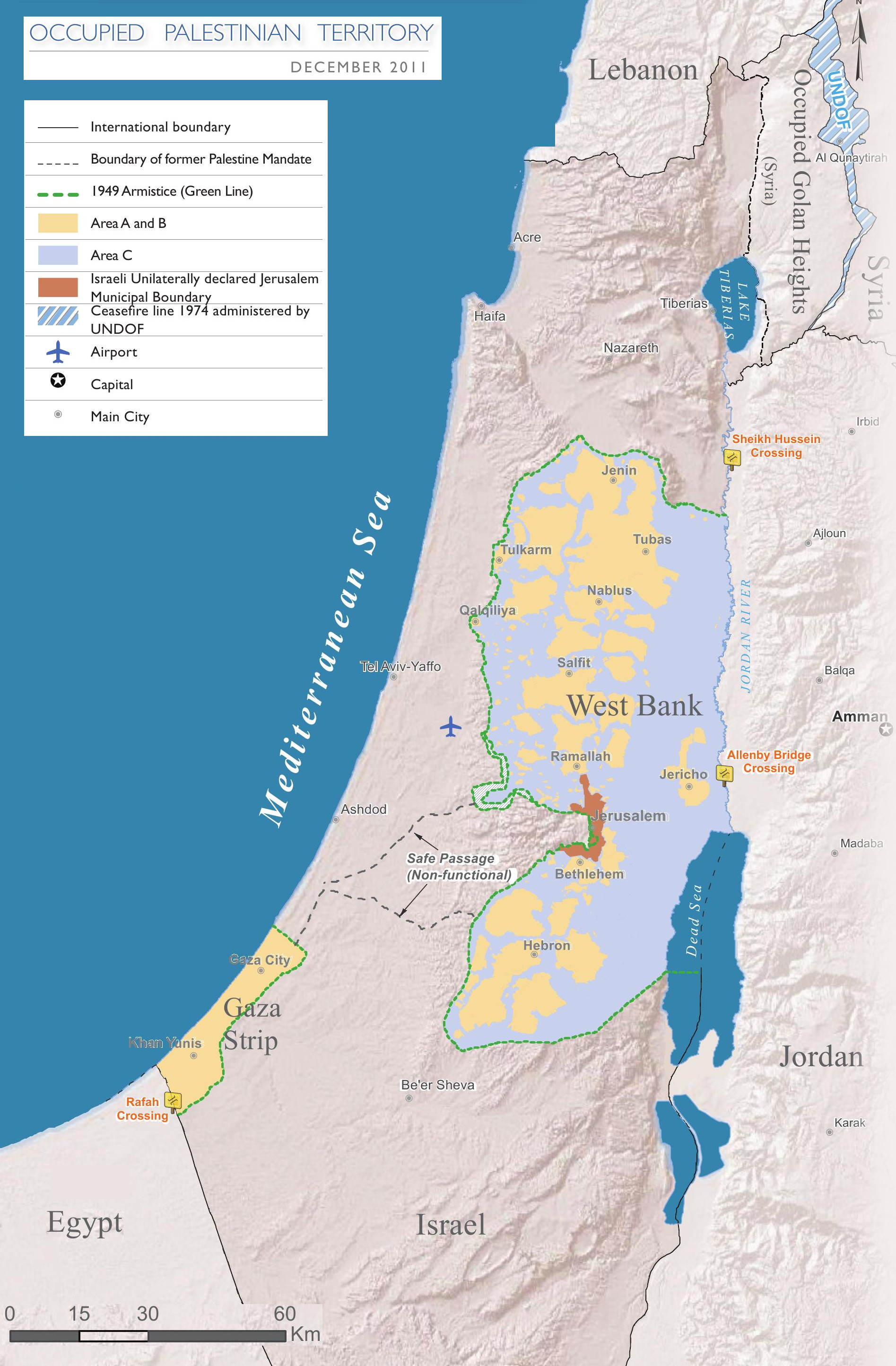
Area C (blue) is part of the West Bank under full Israeli control, in 2011.

The Arab–Israeli conflict was a conflict between Israel and its Arab neighbours, including the Palestinian National Authority that has its origins in the late 19th and early 20th centuries. Israel refuses to recognize Palestinian statehood, while some Arab countries and groups refuse to recognize Israel. Israel has de facto control of East Jerusalem and claims it as its integral territory, although it is not internationally recognized as such. Similarly, most of the Golan Heights are currently under de facto Israeli control and civil administration, whereas most of the international community rejects that claim. The United States formally recognized Israeli sovereignty over the Golan Heights in 2019 through a proclamation by President Donald Trump. However, in recent years, a few Arab states and Israel had formed an alliance to contain the Islamic Republic of Iran and its proxies as part of the Iran–Israel proxy conflict.

=== Nagorno-Karabakh ===
The Nagorno-Karabakh conflict is a frozen conflict with periods of full-scale escalations. The dissolution of the Republic of Artsakh following the 2023 Azerbaijani offensive in Nagorno-Karabakh was seen by some sources as the end of the conflict, though Armenia and Azerbaijan have not formalized an end to the dispute.

=== Russo-Ukrainian War ===
The Russo-Ukrainian war broke out as a Russian reaction to the Euromaidan and the successful Ukrainian Revolution in early 2014. The War in Donbas developed into a frozen conflict after the 2015 Minsk II agreement, which reduced large-scale fighting but failed to produce a lasting settlement. The front line remained largely static for years, with sporadic clashes and ongoing political deadlock between Ukraine and the Russian-backed separatist forces.

The frozen status of the conflict ended in February 2022, when Russia launched a full-scale invasion of Ukraine, dismantling the previous ceasefire framework and escalating the war into an active conflict.

== See also ==
- Civil war
- Cold peace
- Cold war (term)
- List of territorial disputes
- Military history of the Russian Federation
- Protracted social conflict
