= Georgian civil war =

Georgian civil war may refer to:

- Georgian civil war of 1033-1058
- Georgian civil war of 1463–1490
- Georgian civil war of 1623–1658
- Georgian civil war of 1991–1993
