= Post-war Russo-Georgian crisis in 2008–2009 =

2008 diplomatic crisis between Georgia and Russia

After the Russo-Georgian War in August 2008, a number of incidents occurred in Abkhazia and South Ossetia. Tensions between Georgia, Ukraine, the United States and the NATO on one side and Russia, South Ossetia and Abkhazia on the other side remained high in 2008–2009.

== Post-war events in 2008 ==
=== September 2008 ===
==== 1 September 2008 ====
On 1 September 2008, an interview with retired Colonel and Putin critic Vladimir Kvachkov was published. Kvachkov said that Russia had an opportunity to install a new regime in Georgia in August 2008 and the new leader of pro-Russian "democratic" government had already been selected by 12 August. The Russian spetsnaz had the orders to land in Tbilisi and either capture or kill President of Georgia Mikheil Saakashvili. Kvachkov refused to confirm whether Igor Giorgadze was supposed to become Georgia's new president.

Georgian MP Koba Khabazi declared that Georgia must lay claim to the city of Sochi in Russia. He also said that the world was now divided into two blocs: the Communist bloc and the others.

Russian Foreign Minister Sergey Lavrov proposed to impose arms embargo against Saakashvili's regime. This initiative was seen as aimed against the United States and Ukraine.

The Russian Foreign Ministry declared that Georgia was hindering the return of 15 thousand Russian citizens to Russia. Foreign ministry official Andrey Nesterenko claimed that Georgia had begun rearming and the Georgian forces were regrouping on the Georgia–South Ossetia border.

On 1 September 2008, a human chain was formed in Tbilisi and other Georgian cities upon Saakashvili's initiative. Catholicos-Patriarch of All Georgia Ilia II of Georgia gave his blessing.

In response to the sharp escalation with the West over invasion of Georgia, Russia began the largest military exercises in 20 years, named Stability 2008. 47 thousand troops would prepare for the probable nuclear war with the NATO in the 74-day exercises. The simulation scenario envisaged the launch of the Russian nuclear strike on the United States and the total annihilation of all enemy forces. President of Russia Dmitry Medvedev addressed the participants of the exercises in late September and referred to the war in South Ossetia in his speech.

==== 2 September 2008 ====
On 2 September 2008, Russian president Dmitry Medvedev called his Georgian counterpart a "political corpse". American officials suggested that the United States was considering to assist Georgia in the Georgian military rebuilding.

Russian foreign ministry official Andrei Nesterenko accused Georgia of recreating artillery installations near Gori, Georgia and of a military build-up near the security zone of South Ossetia.

President of Abkhazia Sergei Bagapsh declared that no new Russian bases would be built in Abkhazia. He also said that the Russian Black Sea Fleet would not relocate to Abkhazia and only the Russian land forces would continue their presence. Bagapsh said that the Russian recognition of Abkhazia was the end of the unipolar world. Bagapsh warned the West against rearming Georgia which could lead to the World War III. He also warned Georgia against "saber-rattling", otherwise Georgia could lose its statehood.

Anatoliy Nogovitsyn, Deputy Chief of the General Staff of the Armed Forces of the Russian Federation, declared that the US military transport had made 76 flights to Tbilisi in the period from August 13 to September 1 and delivered 1,200 tons of cargo. Nogovitsyn declared that Russia had withdrawn all regular forces from Abkhazia and South Ossetia deployed during the "peace enforcement" operation and only peacekeepers remained there.

The Ministry of Foreign Affairs of Georgia notified the Russian embassy of terminating diplomatic relations. The Russian embassy in Tbilisi would stop operations on 3 September.

An editorial in The Washington Times argued that old Russian weapons were still potent in the battle as evidenced in August 2008.

==== 3 September 2008 ====
$1 billion aid for Georgia was announced by the White House on 3 September 2008. Georgia would receive about half of aid during the remaining term of office of George W. Bush.

As of 3 September 2008, the official Georgian military casualties in the war were announced to be 156 killed.

==== 4 September 2008 ====
On 4 September 2008, Alexander Babakov, Deputy Chairman of the State Duma, compared the Russian invasion of Georgia to Soviet advance into Nazi Germany in the World War II during a discussion on the role of Ukraine in the August 2008 war. Konstantin Zatulin, Deputy Chairman of the Committee of the State Duma on CIS Affairs and Relations with Compatriots, declared that the conflict with Georgia stabilized the situation in the North Caucasus and secured territorial integrity of Russia.

The OSCE began monitoring of the road between Tskhinvali and the Georgian village of Karaleti.

During his visit to Georgia, Vice President of the United States Dick Cheney called the Russian invasion "an illegitimate, unilateral attempt" to alter the borders of Georgia. Cheney stated, "Russia's actions have cast grave doubts on Russia's intentions and on its reliability as an international partner." Cheney said that the US would support Georgia in joining NATO. Chairman of the Russian State Duma Foreign Affairs Committee Konstantin Kosachev claimed that Cheney was creating "anti-Russian axis".

Russian envoy to NATO Dmitry Rogozin said that Russia would not be indifferent to Georgia's accession to NATO and that Russia would not cooperate with NATO over Afghanistan anymore. Rogozin denounced "insolent" visit of the Secretary General of NATO to Georgia projected to take place on September 15–16.

Pavel Borodin, the State Secretary of the Union State of Russia and Belarus, declared that Abkhazia and South Ossetia could join the Union State by the year's end.

==== 5 September 2008 ====
On 5 September 2008, an editorial in Newsweek argued that if the United States decided to rebuild the Georgian army for battling against Russia, NATO's Eastern European members could demand the acquisition of the same defense capabilities.

USS Mount Whitney arrived in Poti. Russian foreign ministry official Andrei Nesterenko stated that Russia would not respond militarily to the increased presence of the NATO in the Black Sea.

Nicaragua recognized the republics of Abkhazia and South Ossetia on 5 September 2008.

==== 6-7 September 2008 ====
On 6 September 2008, Abkhaz president Sergei Bagapsh announced plans to make Abkhazia an Offshore financial centre and to join the Commonwealth of Independent States. He also supported the Russian intervention in the Georgian-Ossetian conflict, saying that if Russia had not intervened, the Abkhaz forces would not have stopped in Poti or Kutaisi.

The foreign ministers of the European Union decided to dispatch observers to Georgia.

Deputy Chairman of the State Duma Vladimir Zhirinovsky declared that Russia should have occupied the whole of Georgia during the war and eliminated the Georgian statehood.

==== 8 September 2008 ====
On 8 September 2008, the International Court of Justice launched hearings into Georgia vs Russia case to examine Russia's role in the ethnic cleansing of Georgians upon Georgia's request.

President of Belarus Alexander Lukashenko declared that Belarus would consider the recognition of Abkhazia and South Ossetia after 2008 Belarusian parliamentary election.

Russian foreign ministry official Andrei Nesterenko announced that BP had stopped transporting oil via the Baku–Supsa Pipeline. Nesterenko said that the Georgian infrastructure losses were $1 billion, while the Georgian currency reserves lost $1.25 billion.

It was reported that Abkhaz de facto authorities allegedly began pressuring the schools in Gali District, Abkhazia to stop teaching in Georgian.

Georgia reported that Russian military near Poti strengthened their presence.

United States Department of State official Matthew Bryza said that the United States did not recognize the Russian buffer zones in Georgia as legal. He also said that the United States would not support an arms embargo against Georgia. Russian Foreign Ministry official Andrei Nesterenko said that Russia was against the deployment of a separate EU mission to Georgia. Russian envoy to NATO Dmitry Rogozin said that Russia would stop cooperating with the NATO if Georgia was granted a MAP because this would mean that "NATO took the side of the aggressor".

2 Polish journalists were arrested near the village of Karaleti by the Russian and South Ossetian forces and were being treated as the Prisoner of wars.

MediaNews agency alleged that the Russian 58th Army had actually lost 1789 soldiers and 105 tanks in the war.

President of France Nicolas Sarkozy and Medvedev signed another agreement on a Russian pullback from Georgia. After meeting with the French president, Medvedev said the withdrawal depended on assurances that Georgia would not use force. The meeting between the European officials and Russian president had lasted over 4 hours. It emerged that after Medvedev had taken a break and left the meeting, Sarkozy threatened to abandon the negotiations because he opposed the Russian demand to remove the point on the Russian withdrawal from Georgia. Medvedev announced that after the international contingent would be deployed to the areas bordering Abkhazia and South Ossetia by 1 October 2008, Russia would withdraw its troops from undisputed Georgia within 10 days. Medvedev said that he had been given a document signed by Saakashvili relinquishing the right of the use of force. President of the United States George W. Bush recalled a draft nuclear cooperation treaty from the United States Congress. Georgian president Saakashvili signed the updated Medvedev-Sarkozy peace plan on the night of 9 September. Saakashvili said that he had shown an evidence to the EU leaders that Georgia did not initiate the hostilities in August 2008.

==== 9 September 2008 ====
On 9 September 2008, Anatoliy Nogovitsyn, deputy chief of the Russian General Staff, met with ambassadors and military attachés of more than 100 countries. He said that the US aid in deploying of Georgian military from Iraq "created a precedent of complicity in the armed conflict on the side of Georgia." Nogovitsyn stated that the Georgian Buk missile system responsible for downing 4 Russian planes was installed east of Gori.

Russia established diplomatic relations with South Ossetia and Abkhazia on 9 September 2008.

On 9 September, anonymous Russian military official said that Russia began complete pullout from Georgia; however, later on the same day, the reporter in Karaleti and Georgian official did not confirm the beginning of the pullout. Russia declared that 7,600 Russian soldiers would remain in Abkhazia and South Ossetia. Russian troops withdrew from Ganmukhuri near the border with Abkhazia, which, according to Georgian Security Council chief Alexander Lomaia, was one of 24 Russian checkpoints or positions outside separatist territories as of 9 September. At the United Nations Security Council, Russian Ambassador Vitaly Churkin proposed a resolution imposing arms embargo on Georgia. Eric S. Edelman, Under Secretary of Defense for Policy, said that "Georgia, like any sovereign country, should have the ability to defend itself and to deter renewed aggression."

Nino Burjanadze, former chairperson of the Parliament of Georgia, said in an interview that Georgia would never accept the loss of the territories and nobody, even Russia, had the right to dictate the Georgian people who should be the president of Georgia.

The New York Times reported that the Russian recognition of Abkhazia and South Ossetia gave new aspirations to separatists in Tatarstan and elsewhere in Russia that they could obtain independence too.

==== 10 September 2008 ====
On 10 September 2008, the International Herald Tribune suggested that Russia was probably waiting for Georgian resistance movement to begin fighting against Russian troops in order to legitimize sustained military occupation of Georgia.

It was reported that the Russian Foreign Ministry was expecting Belarus, Syria, Libya, Jordan and Morocco to recognize Abkhazia and South Ossetia.

A Georgian policeman was killed in a village north of Gori. The shooting happened several hundred meters from a Russian checkpoint in Karaleti, 12 miles (19 km) from South Ossetia. Russian officials denied responsibility, saying that it may have been perpetrated by South Ossetians. The Russian forces barred Ukrainian delegation from visiting Karaleti.

Russian Foreign Minister Lavrov said that the EU-signed document on the deployment of the EU observers to Abkhazia and South Ossetia was irrelevant for Russia. Gennady Zyuganov, leader of the Communist Party of the Russian Federation, said that the Russian leadership made a "grave mistake" by allowing the EU into the conflict zone. Sean McCormack, the United States Department of State representative, said that Russian deployment of 7,600 troops in Abkhazia and South Ossetia "of course, would be a violation of the ceasefire that they signed in August."

Russia's NATO envoy Dmitry Rogozin called on the NATO leadership to postpone a visit to Georgia planned on September 15–16 because it was "inappropriate". Roman Kolodkin, Russian representative in The Hague, asked the international court to reject Georgia's complaint because Russia had "no effective control" over South Ossetia or any Georgian area. Two days later, the Russian Foreign Ministry requested the court to completely remove Georgia's complaint from agenda.

On 10 September 2008, the Russian Central Armed Forces Museum began an exhibition dedicated to the August 2008 war, where Georgian military items captured in Tskhinvali were displayed. Another exhibition featuring the Georgian tanks was opened at the Kubinka Tank Museum.

Head of the Chechen Republic Ramzan Kadyrov said that the Russian recognition of South Ossetia would not cause Chechnya to reconsider being part of Russia and seek independence.

Russian analyst, who shared the views of Aleksandr Dugin, wrote that Gori was a key to the Caucasus region and Russia and South Ossetia had to gain the control of Gori Municipality, while Armenia had to gain Samtskhe–Javakheti and Tsalka Municipality. Thus contiguous Russia-Ossetia-Armenia-Iran axis would be established after Georgia's disintegration and the West would be kept out from the Caspian region.

==== 11 September 2008 ====
On 11 September 2008, former head of Yukos and prisoner Mikhail Khodorkovsky supported the Kremlin's actions in Georgia and Russian recognition of South Ossetia.

On 11 September 2008, the Valdai Discussion Club met with the leader of South Ossetia. Eduard Kokoity said that South Ossetia wanted to join Russia. He also said that the West was ready to recognize united Ossetia if North Ossetia had left the Russian Federation before Kosovo's recognition. Chairman of the Parliament of South Ossetia Znaur Gassiev stated that Kokoity and Medvedev had decided that South Ossetia would join Russia in several years. However, in several hours Kokoity changed his mind and said that South Ossetia would remain independent. Member of the State Duma Anatoly Aksakov noted that a federal constitutional law envisaging the admission of a foreign country or its part into the Russian Federation had been adopted for 7 years and described the procedures. Russian Foreign Minister Sergey Lavrov said in Warsaw, "South Ossetia does not want to join anything. It understood that without declaring independence it would not be able to provide for its own safety." Lavrov also said that U.S. officials had stated that if Georgia attempted "an armed action against Ossetia, then it will scrap their plans for NATO membership." Lenta.ru suggested that Kokoity was not an independent president of a real independent country, but the governor of de facto Russian region. Anonymous source in the Presidential Administration of Russia told Nezavisimaya Gazeta that Kokoity had been asked to keep silence about joining Russia. Member of the State Duma Aleksey Mitrofanov said that Kokoity was given a recommendation not to make such statements which would cause the escalation of tensions with the West.

President Medvedev said that the Georgian "aggression" and continued militarization compelled Russia to rearm and obtain new weapons. He accused the United States of cooperating with "the rotten regimes."

Member of the Georgian opposition Kakha Kukava said that "Russia clearly understands that it would be impossible to replace Saakashvili with [Igor] Giorgadze."

Georgian president Saakashvili told the Associated Press that claims that the US were sending military aid to Georgia was Russian propaganda and there was "no way Georgia can fight wars with Russia".

==== 12 September 2008 ====
On 12 September 2008, Interfax wrote that the world changed on 8 August 2008 and Russia would no longer refrain from acting against Ukraine even if the latter was supported by the United States and the Russian fleet would not leave Crimea.

Russian online journal alleged on 12 September 2008 that American neocons, headed by Randy Scheunemann and George Soros, were lobbying for the US recognition of several regions of Russia as independent in response to the Russian recognition of Abkhazia and South Ossetia.

Eduard Kokoity declared that he would not allow the international monitors to enter South Ossetia. It was reported that talks with Russia failed as Russia did not agree to the deployment of 80 OSCE observers to Georgia.

President Medvedev said that he would not have hesitated to attack Georgia even if Georgia had a MAP. He also said that NATO's consideration of Georgia's membership was offensive for Russia. Medvedev said that Saakashvili had "a mass of pathologies" and "takes narcotic drugs".

On 12 September 2008, the Asian Development Bank gave a $40 million low-interest credit to Georgia in response to the Russian invasion of Georgia. The International Herald Tribune stated that this move by Chinese-dominated bank was one of the rebuffs to Putin by Asia.

On 12 September 2008, the Secretary-General of the GUAM Organization for Democracy and Economic Development declared that Georgia would no longer buy the Russian products and would instead purchase the Ukrainian products.

==== 13 September 2008 ====
Pullout of Russian troops from Georgia began on 13 September 2008. Russian troops began withdrawing from western Georgia, and by 11:00 MSK, the posts near Poti were abandoned. Withdrawals from Senaki and Khobi also took place. The Georgian authorities confirmed the Russian withdrawal from Poti.

Georgian policeman was killed in Ganmukhuri on the Abkhazia–Georgia border. Georgian media reported that South Ossetians took 6 Georgians hostage in the villages of the Tskhinvali District and threatened to burn ethnic Georgians alive if they did not leave their homes. Minister of Internal Affairs of Georgia Vano Merabishvili announced that the special forces would be deployed near the administrative boundaries of Abkhazia and South Ossetia in response to the recent killings of the Georgian policemen.

Spouse of President Saakashvili Sandra Roelofs described the events in the beginning of August 2008 in an interview. She also said that the arrival of 5 European presidents in Tbilisi on 12 August was a turning point.

==== 14 September 2008 ====
On 14 September 2008, Abkhaz authorities accused Georgia of blowing up Excavator belonging to the Russian peacekeeping forces in Gali district.

It was announced that Georgia had resumed the export of electric power to Krasnodar Krai.

Russian Foreign Minister Sergey Lavrov landed at the Babushera airport in Abkhazia, launching an official visit to Sukhumi. Lavrov declared that the border between Abkhazia and Russia would be as transparent as borders within the European Union. Sergei Bagapsh said that the mass return of the Georgian refugees to Abkhazia would not happen.

==== 15 September 2008 ====
On 15 September 2008, RIA Novosti reported that according to Russian military intelligence, Georgia had lost around 3 thousand servicemen in the August 2008 conflict and the Georgian government was artificially lowering the casualties.

Russia's NATO envoy Dmitry Rogozin said that if Georgia was invited to join NATO, the alliance members risked finding themselves in a war against Russia.

Russian Foreign Minister Sergey Lavrov arrived in Vladikavkaz and took a road passing through the Roki Tunnel to Tskhinvali. He met with South Ossetian president Eduard Kokoity near the Roki Tunnel. Lavrov criticized Saakashvili's position that Georgia's commitment to non-use of force would become actual if Abkhazia and South Ossetia were recognized as parts of Georgia as a rejection of the EU-Russia agreement. Lavrov also stated that Ukraine was "shamelessly" using the August 2008 conflict to pursue pro-NATO policy. Head of the OSCE mission in Georgia Terhi Hakala met with Lavrov in Tskhinvali and discussed unimpeded access to South Ossetia for the OSCE. When Lavrov returned to Moscow, he warned against facilitating "the penetration of the anti-Russian virus into the minds of the Georgian people" and that he did "not advise anyone to insult Russia". Lavrov stated that the United States did not grant entry visas for South Ossetian and Abkhaz authorities to attend the United Nations Security Council. The OSCE did not agree to the Abkhaz and Ossetian participation in talks in Geneva scheduled for 15 October 2008.

==== 16 September 2008 ====
On 16 September 2008, Eduard Kokoity abolished taxes in South Ossetia until the end of 2008. Prime Minister of Russia Vladimir Putin declared that a control mechanism should be established to oversee the spending for South Ossetia's reconstruction.

Georgia handed over the bodies of the two Russian pilots, shot down during the conflict, to Russia.

Russia's NATO envoy Dmitry Rogozin said that the international investigation of the war by NATO would not be unbiased and Condoleezza Rice could participate in the investigation.

Pro-Russian party in Latvia proposed the recognition of Abkhazia and South Ossetia.

Vladimir Zhirinovsky told Vladimir Putin that the United States had selected Irakli Alasania, who allegedly had been an agent of the Central Intelligence Agency for 10 years, as the new president of Georgia.

==== 17 September 2008 ====
On 17 September 2008, Russian envoy to NATO Dmitry Rogozin claimed that the Russian intelligence had gotten American plans to use Georgia against Iran and Washington had already started "active military preparations on Georgia's territory" and that the "reason why Washington values Saakashvili's regime so highly" was that he had allowed the US to do so. Rogozin also asserted that the independence of Abkhazia and South Ossetia would be recognized by 20-25 countries in the next year and half.

Medvedev and presidents of Abkhazia and South Ossetia signed treaties in Moscow. Medvedev accused Georgia of "revanchist" tendencies and of rearming for "aggression". Abkhazia and South Ossetia announced plans to apply for admission into the Union State, Commonwealth of Independent States and Collective Security Treaty Organization. The Georgian Foreign Ministry said that the treaties were illegitimate. Eduard Kokoity announced at a press conference that South Ossetia wanted to join Russia.

==== 18 September 2008 ====
On 18 September 2008, Russian Foreign Minister Sergey Lavrov claimed that Georgia's foreign allies were going to train terrorists in Georgia. Lavrov declared that the recognition of Abkhazia and South Ossetia would not serve as a precedent for Transnistria and Nagorno Karabakh. He said that following the Russian recognition, the Russian forces in Abkhazia and South Ossetia were no longer peacekeepers and announced that the Russian military bases would be built in the newly recognized republics.

==== 19 September 2008 ====
On 19 September 2008, Gagauzia and the Government in exile of the Republic of Serbian Krajina recognized Abkhazia and South Ossetia.

Georgian president Saakashvili told Le Monde newspaper that Putin had promised to implement Northern Cyprus scenario in 2006.

The Russian Foreign Ministry official proposed to relocate the office of the UNOMIG from Abkhazia to Georgia. Deputy Assistant Secretary of State David Merkel stated that the United States would help Georgia to restore its military capabilities.

Russian president Dmitry Medvedev met with the public in the Kremlin and discussed Russia's international relations and an internal situation within the country. Medvedev said that the Georgian people were not guilty for the "aggression" and "genocide" perpetrated by the "criminal regime".

==== 20 September 2008 ====
On 20 September 2008, South Ossetia celebrated the 18th year of independence and held a military parade in Tskhinvali. Deputy Foreign Minister of South Ossetia said that the guests had arrived from Chechnya, Kabardino-Balkaria, Rostov Oblast and Belgium. The finale of the parade resembled that of the 1945 Moscow Victory Parade.

President of Nicaragua Daniel Ortega said that the countries of Latin America were considering the recognition of Abkhazia and South Ossetia.

==== 21 September 2008 ====
On 21 September 2008, the Georgian authorities stated a Georgian policeman was killed and three wounded after shots were fired "from the direction of the [nearby] Russian army checkpoint" on the administrative border between Abkhazia and Georgia, with the ensuing trade of fire between Georgian police and Abkhaz-controlled territory continuing for several minutes. Abkhaz authorities confirmed that shootout in the Georgian village of Khurcha had occurred, but denied that the Abkhaz forces were participating in the incident.

==== 22 September 2008 ====
The Ministry of Internal Affairs of Georgia reported that the Russian drone was shot down near Gori on the morning of 22 September. The Russian military denied the loss of the drone.

On 22 September 2008, a mine wounded two Georgian policemen on the administrative border between Abkhazia and Georgia.

It was reported that Hansjörg Haber, chief of the European Union Monitoring Mission in Georgia (EUMM), had already landed in Tbilisi in the previous days.

Boris Gryzlov, the Chairman of the State Duma, visited Tskhinvali. He thanked Marat Kulakhmetov, the commander of the Russian peacekeepers, for his actions during the war.

==== 23 September 2008 ====
On 23 September 2008, Deputy Chairman of the State Duma Vladimir Zhirinovsky said that Russia would militarily invade Ukraine in defense of the residents of Crimea and south-eastern Ukraine if they asked for Russia's help similar to South Ossetia.

Alexander Babakov, Deputy Chairman of the State Duma, proposed to establish a CIS tribunal to try Georgian president Saakashvili.

Abkhaz president Bagapsh announced that Abkhazia would reinforce its border with Georgia. He said that the Russian forces would be deployed in the upper Kodori Valley and the Russian military bases would be established in Gudauta and Ochamchire.

Viktor Ivanov, head of the Federal Drug Control Service of Russia, said that it was Georgia's fault that Russia had become the main consumer of Afghan heroin because Georgia had severed diplomatic relations with Russia and was no longer cooperating in the war with the drugs.

Georgian president Saakashvili addressed the United Nations General Assembly. He said that Georgia approved of the investigation of the causes of the war and would fully cooperate with the investigators.

The EU monitors landed in Georgia.

==== 24 September 2008 ====
On 24 September 2008, a Russian military truck was arrested near the village of Odzisi in the Mtskheta Municipality. The truck contained ammunitions and explosives. The Russian driver said he had lost his way. He was handed over to OSCE observers.

The Georgian authorities announced that the museum of Joseph Stalin in Gori would be transformed into the museum of the Russian aggression.

==== 25 September 2008 ====
On 25 September 2008, Le Nouvel Observateur reported that anonymous high-ranking Russian official said that Putin had declared at the closed government meeting that the war with Georgia showed that the moment arrived when Russia could oppose the West. Putin believed that while the Baltic states were forever lost, Russia still had a chance to restore its hegemony over the rest of the Soviet territory and was waiting for the next probable opportunity in Crimea. The official said that the union of Russia, Belarus, South Ossetia and Abkhazia would be created soon.

Presidents of Abkhazia and South Ossetia appealed to the President of Belarus to recognize their independence.

Vladimir Putin said that the border between Russia and South Ossetia could be abolished. He further said that relations with Georgia would be restored in the future. He said that ties with the civilian sector in Georgia should be maintained.

Bombing claimed the life of a 13-year-old South Ossetian resident in the suburb of Tskhinvali. Minister for Foreign Affairs of Abkhazia Sergei Shamba accused Georgia of terrorism.

As of 25 September 2008, 53 of the Georgian soldiers buried at the Mukhatgverdi military cemetery were still unidentified.

==== 26 September 2008 ====
On 26 September 2008, Georgian president Saakashvili said in an interview with Newsweek that "For nationalists in Russia, the Russian Empire will not be back until Crimea is back."

United States Secretary of State Condoleezza Rice warned the Russian companies against the beginning of mining in Abkhazia and South Ossetia or the U.S. relations with Russia would be jeopardized.

==== 27-29 September 2008 ====
On 27 September, Russian Foreign Minister Sergey Lavrov said at the UN General Assembly session that the European security architecture did not pass the test during the recent war in Georgia. Lavrov said that "Georgian bombing of sleeping city of Tskhinvali" caused an end to Georgia's territorial integrity.

By 29 September 2008, the entire staff of the EU monitoring mission had arrived in Georgia.

Eduard Kokoity announced that South Ossetia would put Georgian president Saakashvili on the most wanted list as a "war criminal".

==== 30 September 2008 ====
On 30 September 2008, Georgian police arrested several residents of Senaki who were spying for Russia.

Russian ambassador Vyacheslav Kovalenko left Georgia along with other workers of the Russian embassy.

The Russian forces near Karaleti attempted to bar the entry of the EU observers into the "buffer zone" bordering South Ossetia. The Russian forces in South Ossetia announced that European monitors would not be admitted into the "buffer zone" bordering South Ossetia.

Georgian Interior Ministry official Shota Utiashvili reported that the Russian spy drone fell down in Akhalgori Municipality.

93 Georgian servicemen were given awards for their participation in the war.

=== October 2008 ===
==== 1-2 October 2008 ====
On 1 October 2008, the European Union Monitoring Mission in Georgia began operation in Georgia.

The South Ossetian authorities accused Georgian saboteurs of firing on a car with 3 Ossetians in the village of Diseu.

The Secretary of the Security Council of Russia, Nikolai Patrushev, said that nuclear weapons could be deployed on the territories of Ukraine and Georgia if they became NATO members.

President Medvedev said that there were no ideological differences between the USA and Russia which could lead to a war between two countries.

On 2 October 2008, Tbilisi City court confirmed previous court ruling that the Russian company MegaFon had to pay fines for illegal operation in South Ossetia.

==== 3-5 October 2008 ====
On 3 October 2008, seven Russian soldiers were killed and another seven wounded by a car bomb that exploded near the Russian military base in Tskhinvali. Among them was Colonel Ivan Petrik, the peacekeeper's Chief of Staff. The attack was denounced by the French Presidency of the European Union. The Russians accused the Georgians of orchestrating the "terrorist attack", claiming that just before the blast, the Russians had seized two cars with four Georgians and munitions, which were taken to Tskhinvali. Interfax was told by a military spokesman that an explosive device equaling about 20 kg of TNT detonated. The South Ossetian leader accused Georgian special forces of "state terrorism", while the Georgian government blamed Russia for the incident, with the Interior Ministry spokesman Shota Utiashvili describing it as a provocation aimed to prolong Russian military presence in Georgia. Georgian official also said only Ossetians could enter the area controlled by Russia and suggested that only "geniuses" could arrange the stealing and transportation by the Ossetians. Russian newspaper Kommersant also speculated that the attack could be used by Russia as a pretext to prolong its military presence in the buffer zones bordering South Ossetia and Abkhazia. The Government of South Ossetia announced on 5 October that financial aid would be given to the families of the killed and wounded peacekeepers. Anonymous South Ossetian official reported that the car had belonged to the OSCE convoy.

By 5 October 2008, four Georgian citizens escaped from the South Ossetian captivity.

On 5 October 2008, the Russian forces began disassembling checkpoints near the Abkhaz boundary. The Russians disassembled a checkpoint and withdrew from Nabakhtevi. The Russian forces lowered the Flag of Russia in Nadarbazevi.

==== 6 October 2008 ====
On 6 October 2008, the Georgian village of Pakhulani (uk) near the Abkhaz boundary was attacked overnight with grenade launchers from Abkhazia. The last blast at around 08:00 coincided with the arrival of the EU observers. A blast took place near the car convoy of the Russian peacekeepers and the EU monitors near the Enguri Dam. Abkhaz border guard was shot near the administrative border between Abkhazia and Georgia. The Russian Foreign Ministry accused "some forces in Tbilisi" of attempting to provoke a new war.

The Georgian Foreign Ministry gave permission to the Swiss embassy to represent the interests of Russia.

South Ossetia decided to open border with Georgia.

On 6 October 2008, Abkhaz representatives visited the European Parliament and attended a hearing organized by Cem Özdemir.

==== 7-9 October 2008 ====
On 7 October 2008, the Holy Synod of the Russian Orthodox Church did not accept the Abkhaz and South Ossetian eparchies into a constituent body of the Russian Orthodox Church. This decision was influenced by the Georgian church's support of Moscow's jurisdiction over the Ukrainian church. According to Protodeacon Andrey Kuraev, the Russian Orthodox Church broke up with the Kremlin's line because it did not want to lose the only Orthodox ally amidst the pending dispute with the Ecumenical Patriarchate of Constantinople.

On 8 October 2008, Russian president Medvedev said in Évian-les-Bains that NATO membership of Georgia and Ukraine "means gaining an upper hand on Russia, while not to receive means capitulating before Russia."

The Russian military announced that the last Russian forces had left the buffer zone bordering South Ossetia by 20:30 on 8 October.

On 9 October 2008, the Council of the heads of the Foreign ministries of the Commonwealth of Independent States (CIS) adopted a resolution in Bishkek terminating the mandate of the CIS peacekeeping force in Abkhazia.

The Russian forces abandoned all posts in Zugdidi and Tsalenjikha districts. Georgian interior minister Vano Merabishvili called on the population of the "buffer areas" to return to their homes. The Russian Foreign Ministry announced that the buffer zones bordering Abkhazia and South Ossetia would now be monitored by the EU mission.

==== 12-14 October 2008 ====
On 12 October 2008, an editorial published by South Ossetian OSInform Information Agency suggested that the time has come to demand the return of the Truso gorge, Gud gorge, and the Kobi structural basin from Georgia.

The Russian Defence Ministry rejected the Georgian allegation that the Russian military planes had flown into Georgia's airspace.

On 13 October 2008, the South Ossetian authorities alleged that a Georgian armed unit had made an unauthorized incursion into South Ossetia to terrorize the residents of South Ossetia before withdrawing.

On 14 October 2008, Andrey Illarionov, former adviser to Vladimir Putin, told EUobserver that if Saakashvili had not engaged the Russo-Ossetian forces in Tskhinvali on 7 August 2008 and resisted their advance on Tbilisi for several days, his government would have been deposed and Igor Giorgadze would have been installed as the leader of Georgia.

The South Ossetian authorities accused Georgia of kidnapping 2 employees of the South Ossetian interior ministry, while South Ossetia's Presidential Commissioner for Human Rights David Sanakoev accused Georgia of intentionally provoking tensions.

State Duma deputy Konstantin Zatulin declared that the Russian leadership severed relationship with the President of Ukraine, Viktor Yushchenko, after the August war.

Russian journalist Maxim Kalashnikov wrote that the Russian army units deployed during the war to South Ossetia were in poor condition. He also wrote that the operation to take Crimea was being considered; however, capturing Crimea would be three times more difficult than the operation against Georgia.

==== 15-16 October 2008 ====
On 15 October 2008, Russian analyst Vyacheslav Nikonov gave an interview to Der Spiegel on the aftermath of the Russo-Georgian war. He said that Russia could no longer guarantee Ukraine's territorial integrity if the war began between Crimea and Ukraine's central government. He further said that Ukraine posed more threat for Russia than Georgia.

On 15 October 2008, talks began between Georgia, Russia and the United States in Geneva. Russian and Georgian NGOs urged the participants to pay attention to the human rights. Abkhaz delegation participated in a separate meeting and did not meet the Georgian side. Georgian president Saakashvili announced that the Russian side abandoned the negotiations prematurely.

On 16 October 2008, First Deputy Prime Minister of Russia Sergei Ivanov announced that Russian military orders in 2009 would total 1.3 trillion Russian rubles (US $50 billion). Such large military spending was linked to the war in South Ossetia. In comparison, Russian military spending was 113 billion rubles in 2003.

South Ossetian Interior Minister Mikhail Mindzaev declared that international monitors bring no benefits.

==== 17-19 October 2008 ====
On 17 October 2008, the Russian State Duma adopted a statement calling on the international community to exert pressure on Georgia to accept the return of Meskhetian Turks. Nino Burjanadze rhetorically asked the host of Echo of Moscow on 9 November why Russia was not giving Russian passports to Meskhetian Turks living in Krasnodar Krai while Russian passports were quickly awarded to the residents of Abkhazia and South Ossetia.

It was reported that the Russian law enforcement agencies believed that the recently activated militants in Ingushetia were acting on orders from the Georgian special agencies.

On 18 October 2008, the Georgian media reported that a bridge in the village of Adzva in Gori Municipality was partially blown up allegedly by Ossetians.

On 18 October 2008, according to South Ossetia, a police post was fired upon from an ethnic Georgian village, with no casualties. South Ossetian Interior Minister Mikhail Mindzaev called the incident as part of a series of provocations by Georgia. South Ossetian police were given orders to return fire should they be on the receiving end of a firing from the Georgian side.

On 19 October 2008, the Georgian village of Khurcha near the Abkhaz boundary was attacked with mortars and grenades.

The Russian forces did not allow the entry of Assistant Secretary of State for European and Eurasian Affairs Daniel Fried and the convoy of the US embassy into occupied Akhalgori Municipality.

Latvian television channel TV3 accused a worker of the Russian embassy in Latvia of preparing an assassination of Georgian president Saakashvili in 2004.

==== 21-24 October 2008 ====
On 21 October 2008, the police car was blown up by a mine near the village of Avnevi and one policeman was injured.

The South Ossetian authorities announced that the governmental commission on the boundary delimitation would be established; however, the border with Georgia would not yet be demarcated.

On 22 October, three Abkhaz, including the head of the Abkhaz military intelligence, were killed in Gali district. Abkhaz president Sergei Bagapsh said that the murder of the head of the Abkhaz military intelligence was the "terrorist attack" by Georgia.

On 23 October 2008, Georgian official Shota Utiashvili reported that the number of the Russian forces deployed in South Ossetia had grown by 2,000 troops and the total number now was 7,000. However, the Russian defense and foreign ministries rejected this report.

Sergey Lavrov claimed that the EU monitors were ignoring a Georgian military build-up near Abkhazia and South Ossetia, which could cause "dangerous clashes". Russian journalist arrived in the buffer zone near South Ossetia and did not see any Georgian forces contrary to Lavrov's claim on the Georgian violation of the Sarkozy-Medvedev agreement.

On 24 October 2008, the Georgian Interior Ministry reported that the Russians had blown up the bridge connecting Abkhazia with the Zugdidi Municipality.

==== 25-27 October 2008 ====
On 25 October 2008, a bomb exploded in the Georgian village near the administrative border with Abkhazia killing the governor of Georgia's Tsalenjikha Municipality, Giorgi Mebonia. One Abkhaz serviceman was wounded in Gali district that day.

On 26 October 2008, Bagapsh accused Georgia of terrorism and attempting to "detach the Gali district" from Abkhazia. Bagapsh accused the European monitors of pro-Georgian bias. In the evening, Abkhaz authorities accused Georgia of having opened fire on the border post.

On 27 October 2008, Russian military expert Pavel Felgenhauer wrote that the hostilities between Russia and Georgia could resume in early 2009 due to the effects of the 2008 financial crisis.

Member of the Abkhaz parliament said that some Georgian villages near the Abkhaz border were historical Abkhaz territories, which were "illegally" given to Georgia during the Soviet era, and Abkhazia would get them back.

Russia summoned an emergency meeting of the UN Security Council to discuss the situation in Abkhazia and South Ossetia.

The EU monitors met with South Ossetian interior minister Mikhail Mindzaev, which was the first meeting between the EU mission and the South Ossetian authorities.

==== 28-31 October 2008 ====
On 28 October 2008, the commander of the Georgian peacekeepers, Mamuka Kurashvili, told the Georgian parliamentary commission on the causes of the war that he witnessed how the Russian warplanes bombed the Russian peacekeeping posts.

On 29 October 2008, the Russian State Duma ratified cooperation agreements with Abkhazia and South Ossetia.

Member of the State Duma Semyon Bagdasarov said that Georgia was a "small mini-empire" and Russia had to "confederate Georgia". He said that Russia had to direct propaganda on the regional minorities of Georgia and transform Georgia into Lebanon. Bagdasarov also stated that Saakashvili's resignation would not cause Georgia's pro-USA policy to change. In response, Georgian MP Petre Mamradze said that the Russian special services had plans for partitioning Georgia into 6-7 parts and their annexation already back in the 90s.

On 31 October 2008, a bridge connecting South Ossetia with the undisputed Georgian territory was destroyed in a blast.

The Russian Federal Service for Veterinary and Phytosanitary Supervision claimed that Georgia was responsible for the outbreak of African swine fever virus in Stavropol Krai.

=== November 2008 ===
==== 1-2 November 2008 ====
On 1 November 2008, Eduard Kokoity appointed Aslanbek Bulatsev as the Prime Minister of South Ossetia and Russian Major-General Yuri Tanaev as defense minister.

On 1 November 2008, Deputy Assistant Secretary of State Matthew Bryza met with Russian Deputy Foreign Minister Grigory Karasin and discussed the situation in Abkhazia and South Ossetia.

On 2 November 2008, Georgian president Saakashvili told Focus magazine that Russia could renew hostilities in the coming weeks.

==== 5-7 November 2008 ====
On 5 November 2008, President Medvedev declared that the United States used the war in Georgia as a pretext for the accelerated deployment of American anti-missile systems in Europe. He further stated in his first Presidential Address to the Federal Assembly that "the local adventure of the Tbilisi regime has triggered fueling up tensions far outside the region, in entire Europe and worldwide." Medvedev accused Georgia of having "destabilized the principles of global order." He accused the West of double standards, but nevertheless said that "the South Ossetian crisis has demonstrated the capability of effective decisions by Europe and we will enhance our relations with Europe in the field of security." Medvedev declared that Russia would not retreat from the Caucasus. Medvedev's announcement to deploy 9K720 Iskander ballistic missile systems in Kaliningrad Oblast was seen as a challenge to the freshly elected US president Barack Obama. The European countries expressed concern over Medvedev's announcement on the deployment of the rockets. After his victory, US President-elect Obama called a number of international leaders, but not Russia's president Dmitry Medvedev. On 9 November 2008, Russian Deputy Foreign Minister Alexander Grushko said that Russia would not deploy Iskander systems in Kaliningrad Oblast if the United States did not install anti-missile shield in Poland and the Czech Republic.

On 7 November 2008, South Ossetian president Eduard Kokoity accused Georgia of being responsible for the terror attack in Vladikavkaz on 6 November. However, Aleksandr Bastrykin, the head of the Investigative Committee of Russia, ruled out the Georgian responsibility.

On 7 November 2008, the Georgian opposition held a rally in Tbilisi for the first time since August 2008.

Johan Verbeke, the UN Secretary-General's Special Representative in Georgia, visited Sukhumi.

==== 8-11 November 2008 ====
On 8 November 2008, the South Ossetian forces entered the Georgian village of Perevi bordering South Ossetia. The next day, the number of the South Ossetian militants increased to 70 and two tanks arrived in Perevi. On 11 November, the South Ossetian authorities said that Perevi was part of Dzau District of South Ossetia contrary to the position of the EUMM that Perevi was outside of South Ossetia. The South Ossetians left the village on 16 November 2008. French president Nicolas Sarkozy approved of the withdrawal.

The Georgian Orthodox Church officials met with Russian Deputy Foreign Minister Grigory Karasin in Moscow on 8 November 2008, which marked the first official meeting between Russia and Georgia since August 2008. Georgian clergy also met with the Russian orthodox church officials and discussed ecclesiastical jurisdiction over Abkhazia and South Ossetia.

On 10 November 2008, two Georgian policemen were killed and three wounded after the police car was hit by a mine near the village of Dvani in the morning. The EUMM condemned the attack.

The South Ossetian authorities discovered the documents containing the names of Ossetian spies working for Georgia in the Georgian village now controlled by South Ossetia.

On 11 November 2008, Russian human rights activist Ella Polyakova reported that about two hundred Russian conscripts and contractors could not leave South Ossetia for home despite the expiration of their service term. Caucasian Knot reported on 20 November that Russian contract soldiers stationed in South Ossetia complained about very low wages compared to what they had been promised before their deployment and poor conditions. The soldiers were receiving 2 times higher wages in Russia.

==== 12-13 November 2008 ====
On 12 November 2008, Chief of the General Staff of the Armed Forces of Russia Nikolay Makarov said that the construction of the Russian military bases in Abkhazia and South Ossetia would be completed in 2009.

On 13 November 2008, Dmitry Medoyev, South Ossetian presidential envoy to Russia, alleged that 21 South Ossetian citizens had been kidnapped from the buffer zone monitored by the EU monitors since 8 October.

Russian State Duma deputy said that Russia was considering to build a base for the Black Sea Fleet in Ochamchire in Abkhazia. Abkhaz foreign minister Sergei Shamba said that negotiations on the establishment of the naval base were underway.

Member of the defense committee of the Russian State Duma Mikhail Musatov said that Russia would buy unmanned aerial drones in Israel because Georgian Israeli-made drones had performed well.

==== 14-18 November 2008 ====
On 14 November 2008, high-ranking Russian official said that Russia would completely withdraw from the Treaty on Conventional Armed Forces in Europe if Georgia and Ukraine were granted NATO MAP.

On 15 November 2008, the EUMM monitors arrived near the Abkhaz boundary to investigate the incident, in which one Georgian policeman had been shot dead, and they were also shot at.

On 16 November 2008, the South Ossetian authorities returned the bodies of 10 Georgian servicemen to Georgia. Earlier, the bodies of 43 killed Georgian servicemen had been returned to Georgia. Georgia returned the remains of the Russian pilot to Russia on 18 November.

On 17 November 2008, a Russian drone fell in the Georgian village of Plavi near the South Ossetian boundary. When the Georgian interior ministry team arrived to investigate, the drone detonated and killed 2 and wounded 9 people.

On 18 November 2008, Russian Defense Minister Anatoly Serdyukov declared in Turkey that Georgia's NATO membership could provoke far more serious conflict than the August 2008 war.

==== 19 November 2008 ====
On 19 November 2008, second Geneva talks between Georgia, Russia, the United States and Abkhaz and South Ossetian representatives were held.

One South Ossetian official was injured upon arrival in the village of Ksuisi.

The Chief of the Russian General Staff, Nikolay Makarov, said that the staff of the Russian military bases in Abkhazia and South Ossetia were already selected. The bases would be located in Tskhinvali, Java and Gudauta. The construction would be finished in late 2010.

==== 20-24 November 2008 ====
On 20 November 2008, Russian Armoured personnel carriers and Abkhaz servicemen entered the Georgian territory and attacked the Georgian servicemen in Ganmukhuri with machine guns and grenade launchers; several hours later grenades were fired on Ganmukhuri from the Abkhaz side and the Russian helicopters hovered over the Georgian village. Abkhaz authorities instead accused the Georgian police of illegally crossing into Abkhazia.

On 21 November 2008, the Georgian National Olympic Committee sent a letter to the International Olympic Committee requesting to refrain from holding the Olympic Games in Sochi due to "security risk".

On 23 November 2008, the Russian forces opened fire when the car convoys of Georgian and Polish presidents passed near the Georgia–South Ossetia border; however, the limousine carrying Saakashvili and Lech Kaczyński did not suffer any damage. The Russian defense and foreign ministries denied the attack on the presidential convoy. Kaczyński said that the idea to visit the South Ossetian checkpoint had belonged to him. The South Ossetian information committee declared that nothing had happened near the border and there was no shooting from South Ossetia. Russian Foreign Minister Lavrov called this incident "yet another provocation" by Georgia. The Visegrád Group and other European countries condemned the attack. South Ossetian information minister Irina Gagloeva confirmed on 25 November that the border guards had fired warning shots into the air to stop the convoy.

On 24 November 2008, Russian president Medvedev signed the ratified law on friendship with Abkhazia and South Ossetia, which had been adopted by the State Duma on 29 October.

==== 25-26 November 2008 ====
By 25 November 2008, Georgian TV station Rustavi 2 reported that Russian Vympel unit was planning assassination of Saakashvili.

On 25 November 2008, it emerged that Secretary of State Condoleezza Rice was working with the European partners to make Georgia and Ukraine NATO members without resorting to MAP. On 26 November, Condoleezza Rice said that the United States would no longer push for granting MAP for Georgia and Ukraine. American officials admitted that the NATO meeting in the following week would not give MAP to Georgia and Ukraine. Rice referenced the British proposal to find alternative to MAP. Two days later, Russian president Medvedev welcomed Rice's announcement, "I am pleased that reason prevailed, unfortunately, at the end of the current US administration."

On 26 November 2008, US Ambassador to Russia John Beyrle said that Abkhazia and South Ossetia would still remain unrecognized by the majority of the world in 5 years.

Georgian interior minister Vano Merabishvili gave a testimony to the Georgian parliament's commission on the causes of the war. He showed photos taken in July 2007 proving that the construction of Russian military bases in Tskhinvali and Java had already started and photos taken in August 2008 showed that the construction had been finished before the Russian invasion. He also showed a video proving that buyers from Iran and Syria were in Java witnessing the launch of OTR-21 Tochka missiles towards Gori.

==== 27-30 November 2008 ====
On 27 November 2008, Eduard Kokoity declared that he wanted to establish visa requirements for Georgia.

South Ossetian official Inal Pliev accused the EU monitors of ignoring the Georgian deployment of BM-21 Grad systems near South Ossetia since the war's end.

On 28 November 2008, Russia's NATO envoy Dmitry Rogozin said that the United States were planning to replace Saakashvili with Nino Burjanadze as the President of Georgia.

It was reported that the Russian authorities were considering the building of additional roads over the Caucasus mountains for communication with the Russian military bases in South Ossetia, while the South Ossetian authorities reported that the construction of the road on the Mamison Pass had already started.

On 29 November 2008, Prime Minister of Denmark Anders Fogh Rasmussen said in Tbilisi that Denmark supported Georgia's accession to NATO without MAP, but not isolation of Russia because NATO and Russia needed each other.

Deputy Defense Minister of South Ossetia Ibrahim Gazseev accused Georgia of opening fire on South Ossetian settlements on 29 November.

=== December 2008 ===
==== 1-2 December 2008 ====
On 1 December 2008, journalist Elena Milashina wrote for Novaya Gazeta that ISU-152 artillery had been deployed on the Zar road before August 2008 in violation of the Dagomys agreement. During the war, Georgia opened the humanitarian corridor on the Zar road and fleeing South Ossetian civilians were caught in the artillery duel between the Georgians and the Ossetian forces in Java. Journalist witnessed the construction of the road from Tskhinvali to Akhalgori; the Russian government had secretly started the construction before the war.

Ruslan Aushev, former Head of the Republic of Ingushetia, said that the Russian recognition of Abkhazia and South Ossetia was a mistake. He further said that South Ossetia's independence was "laughable" and South Ossetia's final fate would be unification with North Ossetia. He warned to expect a new war in the Caucasus.

The scheduled session of the Supreme State Council of the Union State of Russia and Belarus was postponed. Scheduled visit of President of Belarus Alexander Lukashenko to Moscow was also canceled. Russian newspaper Kommersant linked these cancellations to Lukashenko's non-fulfilment of his promise on the recognition of Abkhazia and South Ossetia despite receiving $2 billion credit from Russia.

Federal Security Service (FSB) official claimed in an interview with Komsomolskaya Pravda that Georgia was intending to use Chechen militants for the sabotage against the Russian forces in Abkhazia and South Ossetia.

US president George Bush decreed on 25 November 2008 to allocate funds for the insurance of all American merchant ships against war risks in the Black Sea until March 2009 in connection with the situation in Georgia. Meanwhile, RBK Daily reported on 2 December 2008: "In the corridors of power, it is assumed that the sequel to the Caucasian war will be far from being five days long." Mikhail Chernov, Secretary of International Movement for United Ossetia, commented on Bush's decree that a new war could begin in January–March 2009. Due to inability to move in the snow from the north, Russia would be forced to enter Georgia from Armenia to aid South Ossetia and capture Akhalkalaki Municipality. After the war's end, Gori Municipality and Trialeti would be annexed into South Ossetia to guarantee the security of South Ossetia and "Georgia as a state will cease to exist", therefore Russia would gain a direct overland connection with Armenia.

France, Germany, Italy, Spain, Belgium, Netherlands and Luxembourg were against granting MAP to Georgia and Ukraine at the Brussels summit of the NATO foreign ministers on 2 December. Vladimir Putin later suggested that the new US administration was seeking to improve relations with Russia: "We hear at an expert level from those people, who have close ties with the President-elect [Barack Obama], his inner circle, that it is not necessary to accelerate this process [of NATO expansion], it is not necessary to spoil relations with Russia."

==== 4 December 2008 ====
On 4 December 2008, Abkhaz president Sergei Bagapsh announced that the Abkhaz military would be deployed to the security zone in Gali district after the withdrawal of the Russian peacekeeping contingent. He announced the beginning of the distribution of the Abkhazian passports to the residents of Gali district. The Abkhaz military deployment to the Georgian border began on 10 December.

Deputy Chairman of the Department of Combat Training of the Russian Ground Forces Vladimir Chabanov announced that special mountain units, prepared for action in high altitude conditions, would be created and deployed in the military bases in South Ossetia and Abkhazia. It was announced that the Russian Defense Ministry was planning to sign a contract with the Russian Mountaineering Federation for the training of 1000 military alpinism instructors. One member of the Public Council under the Ministry of Defense of the Russian Federation said that Russia could have to wage the war with Georgia in mountainous terrain in the next 10–15 years.

==== 5 December 2008 ====
Nezavisimaya Gazeta reported on 5 December 2008 that there were problems in the formation of the military bases in Abkhazia and South Ossetia since the actual wages turned out to be 3 times lower than promised and recruited contract soldiers from the North Caucasus were abandoning the army.

On 5 December 2008, the Georgian interior ministry reported that the Georgian village of Mereti had been fired into by the Ossetians.

Russian Foreign Minister Sergey Lavrov urged the OSCE to work on resuming natural gas supplies from Georgia to Tskhinvali for averting the "humanitarian catastrophe" in South Ossetia.

Deputy chief of Russia's General Staff Anatoliy Nogovitsyn claimed that Georgia would start a "new military adventure" against Abkhazia and South Ossetia with the backing of NATO. Assistant Secretary of State for European and Eurasian Affairs Daniel Fried called on Russia to allow the international observers into South Ossetia because there was no need for "a cycle of retaliations, tension, threats".

==== 8 December 2008 ====
On 8 December 2008, Switzerland decided to represent Russia's diplomatic interests in Georgia.

Newly-appointed Minister of Foreign Affairs of Georgia Grigol Vashadze said that he maintained friendly relations with several high-ranking Russian diplomats. He said that restoration of diplomatic relations with Russia was possible.

Patriarch Ilia II of Georgia held the memorial service of recently deceased Patriarch Alexy II of Moscow in Georgian at the Cathedral of Christ the Saviour in Moscow. The next day, Ilia II met with Russian president Medvedev. Ilia II returned to Tbilisi on late 11 December. He told journalists that Medvedev supported return of Georgian refugees. Press secretary of the Russian president Natalya Timakova confirmed that Medvedev had supported the return of Georgian refugees to the Georgian territories.

Russian military expert Pavel Felgenhauer noted that although Moscow was hoping that Saakashvili would soon be overthrown by the Georgian opposition, many Georgians did not support the Georgian opposition who were seen as borderline traitors. Felgenhauer argued that Russia might again attack Georgia in the spring.

==== 10 December 2008 ====
On 10 December 2008, South Ossetian president Eduard Kokoity told Komsomolskaya Pravda that the Russian government officials and the heads of the Russian regions had been advising him against close ties with Russia because Russian Federation would have soon dissolved. According to Kokoity, Saakashvili had offered him $20 million in 2003 for abandoning pro-Russian orientation.

At around 11:00, the Georgian police car hit a mine in the area near the South Ossetian border, which recently had been de-mined, without any casualties. Later, fire was opened on the OSCE car near the South Ossetian boundary from the South Ossetian side.

Nikolay Makarov, the Chief of the Russian General Staff, rejected the reports that Russia was going to attack Georgia in Spring 2009. Makarov declared that the conflict with Georgia triggered the military reforms in the Russian army.

EU envoy Pierre Morel and UN envoy Johan Verbeke met with Abkhaz foreign minister Sergey Shamba in Sukhumi.

==== 12 December 2008 ====
On 12 December 2008, Eduard Kokoity announced plans to rename the street of Joseph Stalin in Tskhinvali into the street of Dmitry Medvedev. Kokoity added that another central street in Tskhinvali would be named after Vladimir Putin. In June 2011, two streets in the new Moskovsky district of Tskhinvali were named after Putin and Medvedev.

Russian Deputy Foreign Minister Grigory Karasin said that Georgia "should take the first steps" to reestablish relations with Russia.

Russian company Russobit-M released a video game titled Confrontation: Peace Enforcement. The game is set in 2009, when Georgia undertakes another attempt at capturing Abkhazia and South Ossetia. NATO, Poland and Ukraine are also involved in the conflict against Russia.

On 12 December 2008, the Russian forces withdrew from Perevi; eight hours later they re-entered the village and Georgian police withdrew after the Russians warned they would fire. The European ambassadors were barred from entering the village. The Russian Foreign Ministry claimed on 19 December that Georgia deployed special police forces to Perevi "in gross violation of the Medvedev-Sarkozy plan" after the Russian withdrawal and the Russian forces were compelled to return to the village to prevent the crisis.

==== 15 December 2008 ====
On 15 December 2008, Andrey Lugovoy told El País newspaper that were he in place of Russian president Dmitry Medvedev, he would have ordered the physical elimination of Saakashvili.

Konstantin Kosachev, chairman of the Russian State Duma Foreign Affairs Committee, said that Georgia and Ukraine would sooner or later become NATO members. He continued: "And if we continuously insist that this is unacceptable for us, it will be very difficult for us to establish relations with the West after they enter."

==== 16-17 December 2008 ====
On 16 December 2008, Russian ambassadors to Abkhazia and South Ossetia presented their credentials to the respective presidents.

Georgian metropolitan bishop Peter of Chkondidi and Russian archbishop Feofan of Stavropol met at the Civic Chamber of the Russian Federation to discuss mending ties between Russia and Georgia. The meeting was also attended by Georgian journalist Malkhaz Gulashvili, researcher Mamuka Areshidze and former Russian ambassador to Georgia Vyacheslav Kovalenko. The next day, members of the Georgian opposition supporting Georgia's neutral status visited Moscow to gain the support of the Russian government. One member of the Georgian opposition said that if Georgia joined NATO, then the independence of Abkhazia and South Ossetia сould be recognized by more than 10 rogue states, which could spell an end to Georgia's attempts at reintegration of these territories. Russian expert Mikhail Vinogradov suggested that the talks on the reintegration of Abkhazia and South Ossetia into Georgia would be possible in 5 years.

Deputy Assistant Secretary of State Matthew Bryza said that if Russian provocations in Georgia did not stop, "it is difficult to predict what will happen".

The Chief of the Russian General Staff, Nikolay Makarov, said that the officers capable of managing troops in the conflict between Russia and Georgia had to be individually searched for throughout the Russian army in August 2008.

On 16 December 2008, an editorial published by Russian KM.RU newspaper stated that the return of Igor Giorgadze from Russia to Georgia would be a "nightmare" for Saakashvili's government.

On 17 December 2008, The New York Times reported that the United States European Command had carried out a secret assessment of the Georgian army in October–November 2008. The condition of the Georgian army was rated as poor despite years of American training.

==== 18-19 December 2008 ====
On 18 December 2008, the Georgian interior ministry reported that a Georgian policeman was injured in the village of Khurvaleti near South Ossetia as a result of the attack from South Ossetia.

Alexander Bortnikov, the director of the Federal Security Service (FSB), announced that FSB had arrested several Georgian spies in 2008.

Grigory Karasin said that the Russian forces would not leave Abkhazia and South Ossetia until the complete security for these territories was guaranteed.

Former Georgian security minister Igor Giorgadze said that no dissident could have come to power in the Soviet republics without Moscow's permission. Giorgadze further claimed that modern Georgia was actually ruled by Matthew Bryza. He also said Georgian ethnos would disappear in the battle against Russia in the near future. Giorgadze suggested that Georgia could lose its statehood if it continued to pursue anti-Russian policy. He said that Georgia would be reunited with Abkhazia and South Ossetia if the geopolitical situation around Russia changed. Giorgadze said that he hoped that he would be allowed to run for president of Georgia. Member of the State Duma Sergei Markov said that the Georgian opposition was against new pro-American members of the opposition, Nino Burjanadze and Irakli Alasania. He further stated that the chances of Igor Giorgadze to become Georgia's president were small due to the current anti-Russian stance of the Georgian people; however, such stance could be changed and Giorgadze could have a chance.

On 19 December 2008, Russian Deputy Defense Minister Nikolay Pankov announced that the families of the killed Russian soldiers would each receive $100,000 and the wounded soldiers would get $30,000. Pankov announced in February 2009 that 19 of the killed Russian servicemen had been married and apartments would be awarded to their spouses.

==== 22-26 December 2008 ====
On 22 December 2008, Russia voted against the continuation of the OSCE mandate in Georgia after January 2009.

On 23 December 2008, the chairman of the Union of Georgians in Russia, Mikheil Khubutia, told Kommersant that he had met with Saakashvili in Munich in November 2008 and discussed the restoration of diplomatic relations between Georgia and Russia.

Aleksandr Bastrykin, the head of the Investigative Committee of Russia, announced that a total of 162 civilians had died in the war in South Ossetia.

On 24 December 2008, President Dmitry Medvedev declared that Russia would remember Ukraine's military aid to Georgia during the war.

On 26 December 2008, Georgian MP Paata Davitaia, who was investigating the war, announced that he would appeal to the Georgian National Security Council to declassify correspondence between Medvedev and Saakashvili.

Konstantin Kosachev said that the activation of the Georgian opposition created the possibility for Russia to build relations with the new government of Georgia in 2009. Mikhail Shvydkoy, cultural ambassador of Russia's president, met with the Georgian Foreign Minister in Tbilisi.

Russian political expert Andrey Okara stated in Kyiv that after Georgia, Ukraine would become an area of "controlled chaos". He alleged that Barack Obama would start the conflict in Crimea, which would develop into World War III.

==== 27-31 December 2008 ====
On 27 December 2008, the South Ossetian official alleged that Georgia had deployed special police forces in the village of Ditsi on the South Ossetian border. The Georgian interior ministry official rejected this report and instead suggested that the South Ossetians were spreading this rumor to cover up their preparation of provocation. Two days later, the South Ossetian authorities accused Georgia of deploying 28 tanks near the South Ossetian border.

On 29 December 2008, USS Taylor (FFG-50) arrived in Poti and delivered the humanitarian assistance. This was the sixth American military ship that had visited Georgia since the war's end. However, Russia was doubting the humanitarian nature of the cargo deliveries.

On 30 December 2008, the Georgian Foreign Ministry expressed concern over the situation in the North Caucasus and stated that Russia was a source of destabilization in the region. The ministry also stated that it was "surprised" by Medvedev's statement that the recognition of Abkhazia and South Ossetia would strengthen the security in the Caucasus region.

On 31 December 2008, the Russian Black Sea Fleet claimed to have downed 5 Georgian UAVs in a single day.

The Russian Foreign Ministry praised Georgia for assisting in repatriation of Russian Doukhobors from Georgia to Tambov Oblast.

Russian company Inter RAO and the Georgian government reached an agreement on the management of the Enguri HES partially located on the Abkhaz territory.

== Relations in 2009 ==
=== January 2009 ===
==== 1-7 January 2009 ====
On 1 January 2009, Ruslan Kishmaria, representative of the President of Abkhazia in Gali district, said that Abkhazia was still in the state of war with Georgia and would strengthen the state border with Georgia.

On 4 January 2009, the Georgian interior ministry reported that a Georgian police post near the Abkhaz boundary was attacked at 08:00. Abkhaz authorities denied the responsibility for firing on the Georgian post.

On 5 January 2009, Alexey Miller, chairman of Russian Gazprom, announced that Georgia was ready to resume natural air supply to Tskhinvali. However, Georgian Energy Minister Aleksandre Khetaguri said that the supply would resume after the repair of the pipeline was completed. Journalist Vitaly Portnikov commented that the Russian agreement with Georgia meant that South Ossetia was not viable: "without mutual cooperation with Georgia, this territory, separated from Russia and its North Ossetian brothers by mountains, simply cannot exist." The pipeline was shut down on 8 August 2008 after the wartime damage, but Russia was claiming that Georgia was carrying out "inhuman act" by enforcing intentional blockade against Tskhinvali. The pipeline was repaired by 16 January 2009 and Itera Georgia announced on 21 January it was waiting for the approval of the Georgian government to resume supplies to Tskhinvali. Georgia resumed gas supplies to Tskhinvali on 23 January 2009 and the Russian Foreign Ministry welcomed this.

On 6 January 2009, the South Ossetian Ministry of Press and Mass Communications accused Georgia and Dmitry Sanakoyev of preparing a large-scale provocation against South Ossetia and the Russian military forces in South Ossetia. Meanwhile, Russian military expert Konstantin Sivkov saw Ukraine's refusal to pay for Russian natural gas as a "step aimed at unleashing major military conflicts" against Russia in the Caucasus.

==== 8-15 January 2009 ====
On 8 January 2009, the Georgian interior ministry reported that fire was opened from Abkhazia on the village of Orsantia.

The Georgian Labour Party, opposition party, proposed a "framework agreement" with Russia.

On 9 January 2009, South Ossetian deputy defense minister Ibrahim Gazseev accused the EU monitors of keeping silence about the Georgian deployment of at least 300 troops near the South Ossetian border.

Russian Gazprom announced readiness to help Georgia in repairing the gas pipeline to Armenia.

On 9 January 2009, Georgia and the United States signed a partnership treaty; however, the treaty would not provide security for Georgia. Matthew Bryza said that the US would wage a diplomatic war to convince Russia that the recognition of the Georgian territories was erroneous.

On 10 January 2009, it was reported that Eduard Kokoity could be planning a provocation against Georgia to cover up his own embezzlement of Russian aid money.

On 15 January 2009, it was announced that the United States would sanction the companies operating in Abkhazia and South Ossetia. However, member of the Russian State Duma Andrey Klimov was not concerned, instead saying that Russian economic ties with the USA were minimal.

==== 16-21 January 2009 ====
On 16 January 2009, the Georgian interior ministry reported that fire from South Ossetia killed one Georgian policeman.

South Ossetian and Abkhaz ambassadors presented their credentials to Russian president Medvedev. The next day, the Georgian Foreign Ministry condemned the killing of the Georgian policeman as "provocation" and noted that the reception of Abkhaz and South Ossetian ambassadors alongside other ambassadors of the UN-member states demonstrated that Russia was pushing "virtual reality".

On 16 January 2009, Liberal Democratic Party of Russia published an article on its site, which stated that Ukrainian President Viktor Yushchenko was contemplating to aid Saakashvili by opening a second front against Russia in Crimea.

On 18 January 2009, the Georgian Interior Ministry reported that fire was opened from Abkhazia on a Georgian police post in Koki.

On 19 January 2009, Russian president Dmitry Medvedev banned arms trade and military co-operation with Georgia until December 2011. Andriy Parubiy, member of Our Ukraine–People's Self-Defense Bloc, said that Medvedev's order was "yet another attempt of pressure on Ukraine". The Georgian Foreign Ministry stated that Russian weapons were used by "the most odious regimes" threatening the world peace. Concerns were raised in Czechia that Czechia would be left without spare parts for its Soviet and Russian-made military machinery.

Russian expert Anatoly Tsyganok wrote that a possibility of the new war between Russia and Georgia was real. He also wrote that the deployment of Iskander missile systems in the North Caucasus would enable Russia to cover the entire territory of Georgia.

The Georgian interior ministry reported that 2 Georgian policemen were injured near South Ossetia when they were fired upon.

On 20 January 2009, Russian Foreign Minister Sergey Lavrov handed the ratified cooperation treaty to his South Ossetian counterpart Murat Jioev.

OSCE envoy Knut Vollebæk was denied permission to enter Tskhinvali.

Zurab Nogaideli, the leader of the Georgian opposition, urged to reduce the Georgian defense spending.

On 19 and 21 January, Russia demanded that Georgian military installations to be checked by Russian experts per a 1999 Vienna OSCE resolution on confidence and security-building measures. In response, the Georgian Foreign Ministry declared the Force majeure in relations between the two countries.

==== 22-31 January 2009 ====
On 22 January 2009, Eduard Kokoity congratulated Barack Obama with his inauguration as the US president and invited him to Tskhinvali.

Belarus said it would make a decision about recognising South Ossetia and Abkhazia on 2 April; however, later the European Union threatened that recognition would jeopardise normalization of relations.

On 23 January 2009, Georgian president Saakashvili compared Vladimir Putin with Iranian Shah Abbas the Great and said Georgia did not have such "vigilant enemy" after Abbas. Saakashvili said that Nicaraguan president Daniel Ortega was "out of his mind".

Russia expressed concern over "Georgia's expanding military presence on the borders of Abkhazia and South Ossetia." Russian Foreign Minister Sergey Lavrov had claimed 1 week earlier that the EU monitors had confirmed the Georgian build-up.

On 25 January 2009, the bomb exploded in Gali district of Abkhazia without any casualties. Abkhaz authorities accused Georgia for this attack against the Abkhaz law enforcement.

On 26 January 2009, the Georgian authorities and the EUMM reached an understanding that Georgia would not deploy its forces near the boundaries of Abkhazia and South Ossetia without prior notification to the EU mission. The signed memorandum prohibited the deployment of the heavy artillery and more than a battalion in the buffer zones extending around 15 km from the borders Abkhazia and South Ossetia.

On 28 January 2009, Konstantin Kosachev, chairman of the Russian State Duma Foreign Affairs Committee, said that if the Parliamentary Assembly of the Council of Europe (PACE) made an inaccurate assessment of August 2008 events, the war would renew. The Parliamentary Assembly of the Council of Europe adopted a resolution criticizing Russia for the recognition of the Georgian territories and the military buildup. This was seen as a diplomatic defeat for Russia. The resolution recognized that Russian military presence in Akhalgori, Perevi and the Kodori Valley was military occupation. The PACE had not supported any Russian-proposed changes to the resolution.

On 29 January 2009, General Carter Ham, commander of the United States Army Europe, visited Georgia. It was reported that Georgia could be discussing the opening of the US military bases in Marneuli and Poti in response to the Russian military deployment to Abkhazia. But Georgia was ready to refrain from the deployment of American military bases if Russia stopped the construction of the bases in Abkhazia. On 3 February, Abkhaz deputy foreign minister Maxim Gvinjia said that if Russia improved ties with the USA and Georgia, there would be no need for the Russian military bases in Abkhazia and Abkhazia would accept this. On 5 February, the European Union expressed concern over Russia's plans to build military bases in Abkhazia and urged Russia to respect the ceasefire agreement. NATO Secretary-General Jaap de Hoop Scheffer declared at the Munich Security Conference on 7 February: "I cannot see how we can have such a serious discussion of such a new [European Security] architecture, in which President Medvedev himself says territorial integrity is a primary element when Russia is building bases inside Georgia, a country that doesn't want those bases."

It was reported in late January 2009 that Russia had secretly suggested to Armenia to start the war against Georgia in Javakheti in 2009.

==== Glukhov's case ====
On 26 January 2009, Russian junior sergeant Alexander Glukhov appeared in Tbilisi. He gave press interviews at McDonald's in the presence of the Georgian Interior Ministry officials. The 21-year-old claimed that bad living conditions and problems with his superior forced him to desert. The soldier declared that he applied for political asylum in Georgia. Russia requested Glukhov's release, claiming that he might be tortured. Deputy Chairman of the State Duma Vladimir Zhirinovsky urged that Russia must take a decisive action against Georgia and recalled how Israel deployed its forces and bombed Lebanon. Moskovskij Komsomolets later found out that Glukhov was not the only deserter from South Ossetia, since soldier from Buryatia had previously attempted to abandon his garrison.

On 9 February, Assistant Commander-in-Chief of the Russian Ground Forces Igor Konashenkov reported that the Russian Defense Ministry had paid for Glukhov's mother's trip to Tskhinvali. Glukhov's mother was demanding to meet her son near Tskhinvali. Later, Glukhov himself said that Tskhinvali was not a safe place and instead demanded to meet his mother in Tbilisi. Youth group Nashi announced that a rally demanding the return of Glukhov would be held near the Georgian embassy in Moscow on 13 February.

Main Military Prosecutor of Russia announced on 17 March that a criminal case of desertion was opened against Sergeant Alexander Glukhov. Glukhov's mother arrived in Tbilisi from Kyiv and met with her son on 10 April 2009. On 28 April, the Russian Prosecutor General's Office submitted a request for extradition of Glukhov to Georgia. The Main Military Prosecutor's Office of Russia concluded on 27 May that Glukhov's drafting in the army had been legitimate. Glukhov's mother said on 30 June 2009 that her son had been granted refugee status in Georgia.

=== February 2009 ===
==== 2-9 February 2009 ====
On 2 February 2009, the South Ossetian defense ministry accused the European monitors of ignoring the concentration of the Georgian police forces along the entire border of South Ossetia. At a meeting with the EU representatives, Russian Deputy Foreign Minister Alexander Grushko raised concerns over alleged Georgian buildup near South Ossetia. Grushko said that Georgia must sign the agreement on non-use of force against Abkhazia and South Ossetia.

On 3 February 2009, Russian president Medvedev addressed the congress of the Union of Georgians in Russia in the Moscow International House of Music and stated that Russia wanted friendship with the Georgian people.

On 4 February 2009, Russian media reported that Ukraine could be helping Georgia to prepare for the new war with Russia. Russian journalist Boris Borisov wrote that Russia had participated in the overthrow of Zviad Gamsakhurdia, but this regime change did not make Georgia pro-Russian. He further wrote that there would be a new war between Russia and Georgia. If Russia did not solve the Georgian question by achieving complete de-sovereignization of Georgia, Russia would always be on the verge of the war with NATO and Ukraine. He also wrote that cancellation of Georgia as a subject of international law would also mean partial de-sovereignization of the USA and that the war with Ukraine was "historically almost inevitable". Borisov proposed to try Saakashvili at Tskhinvali city court and his public hanging would serve as a warning for Yushchenko.

On 6 February 2009, Ralph Peters suggested that Vladimir Putin could assassinate Georgian president Mikheil Saakashvili in 2009.

Georgia submitted the application against Russia to the European Court of Human Rights, continuing the process that began on 11 August 2008.

REGNUM News Agency was told by a source with links to the Russian Black Sea Fleet that 80% of the Black Sea Fleet on constant readiness was located in Ochamchire, Abkhazia.

On 8 February 2009, Dmitry Rogozin said that Georgian president Mikheil Saakashvili was not given permission to speak behind a lectern at the Munich Security Conference because he had lost western sympathies. According to Alexei Venediktov, Saakashvili had already given a speech in the past year, so he would not be allowed to speak again this year.

On 9 February 2009, the South Ossetian authorities accused Georgia of attacking Tskhinvali with grenades, but Georgia denied this. The South Ossetian defense ministry accused Georgia of preparing for a new "aggression" against South Ossetia.

==== 10-12 February 2009 ====
On 10 February 2009, a land mine exploded near the cars of the Abkhaz border guards in Gali district at 10:05. Abkhaz authorities accused Georgia of terrorism. According to Georgian media, the exploded cars were transporting arms and there were casualties. Georgian Reintegration Minister Temur Iakobashvili proposed to demilitarize Abkhazia by making Abkhazia a "zone free from weapons". In turn, Georgia would commit to not deploying the Georgian forces to Abkhazia.

On 10 February 2009, Alexander Zelin, Commander-in-Chief of the Russian Air Force, did not rule out participation in future armed conflicts near Russia's borders, in which Russia would force the enemy to peace on terms acceptable to Russia. Commander-in-Chief of the Russian Ground Forces Vladimir Boldyrev said that an analysis of the war in Georgia demonstrated the need to equip the Russian forces with new armored vehicles, high-precision weapons and combat equipment. General Nikolay Solovtsov, Commander-in-Chief of the Russian Strategic Rocket Forces, declared that 96% of the rocket launchers were ready to be launched within 10s of seconds, which was the highest level of readiness among the components of the Strategic Nuclear Forces, and that the Strategic Rocket Forces possessed two thirds of Russia's nuclear warheads. Russian president Dmitry Medvedev declared on 17 March 2009 that in face of NATO's attempt to expand to Russia's borders, Russia would increase the combat readiness of the Strategic Nuclear Forces.

On 11 February 2009, several Georgian officials said that some members of the international fact-finding commission, which was investigating the causes of the 2008 war and was chaired by Heidi Tagliavini, were biased against Georgia.

On 12 February 2009, Director of National Intelligence Dennis C. Blair said that Russian actions in Georgia "increase the risk of provocation, overreaction, or miscalculation leading to a resumption of fighting."

The OSCE Permanent Council decided to prolong the mandate of the OSCE mission in Georgia.

The Abkhaz foreign ministry sent a letter to the UN that Abkhazia was agreeing with the continuation of the mandate of the UN mission by the United Nations Security Council.

==== 13-18 February 2009 ====
On 13 February 2009, Georgian Young Lawyers' Association submitted 49 lawsuits against Russia to the European Court of Human Rights regarding the civilian victims of the war.

Shalva Natelashvili, leader of the Georgian opposition party Georgian Labour Party, said that Saakashvili was a "political corpse" and a "policy of appeasement towards Russia is needed". He also said he had recently met with Aleksandr Dugin in Vienna who said that "it will be easier to disintegrate Georgia" under Saakashvili's rule.

Russian UN envoy Vitaly Churkin proposed to completely relocate the UN security zone from Abkhazia to Georgia.

On 17 February 2009, Eduard Kokoity announced that Georgia would have to pay for South Ossetian water beginning April 1. In response, the Georgian authorities announced that they would use alternate water supplies for 50 Georgian villages near South Ossetia.

Alexander Vasiliyevich Golovin, Special Representative of the President of the Russian Federation for Delimitation and Demarcation of the State Border with Neighboring CIS States, announced that the delineation of the state borders between Russia, Abkhazia and South Ossetia would begin in 2009. The Abkhaz and South Ossetian authorities were apparently willing to cede the Exclusive economic zone in the Black Sea formerly claimed by Georgia and the entirety of the Roki Tunnel, thus Russia's borders would expand.

On 18 February 2009, an agreement was reached in Geneva on "proposals for joint incident prevention and response mechanisms".

==== 20-27 February 2009 ====
On 20 February 2009, Dmitry Peskov, Press-Secretary of Vladimir Putin, commented on the selection of the song "We don't wanna put in" by the Georgian group Stephane and 3G to be sung at Eurovision Song Contest 2009 in Moscow that this would amount to "simple hooliganism". Eurovision organizers banned the Georgian song alluding to Putin on 10 March. On 11 March, Georgia decided not to participate in the contest altogether. John Kennedy O'Connor, official historian of Eurovision, later stated that the Georgian song could have won the contest which frightened Russia.

In late February 2009, Pavel Felgenhauer, a military analyst, said that Russia intended to provoke the death of the Russian soldier and invade Georgia from South Ossetia in order to topple the Saakashvili government. He suggested that he had obtained the information from Grigory Karasin and other high-ranking Russian government members. Felgenhauer told Radio Svoboda that Russia could not physically wage the war until the end of April and August was the latest date the war could be waged.

On 24 February 2009, British Foreign Secretary David Miliband welcomed the 13 February decision of the UN Security Council to prolong the term of the UN Mission in Georgia.

On 25 February 2009, Abkhaz foreign minister Sergey Shamba criticized Czech Foreign Minister Karel Schwarzenberg for cautioning Belarus against recognizing Abkhazia.

Georgian MP Paata Davitaia proposed at the session of the Georgian parliament to urge the Georgian Foreign Ministry to inform the World Trade Organization of Russia's illegal granting of commercial barcode to Abkhazia.

The South Ossetian Ministry of Printing and Mass Communications accused Georgia of planning to buy weapons banned by the Geneva Convention in Ukraine.

The Investigative Committee of Russia claimed to have found evidence of the Ossetian "genocide" by Georgia.

On 26 February 2009, the Russian Foreign Ministry criticized the report of the US Department of State as having been "prepared during the presidency of George W. Bush" and that the American assessment of the August war "can't withstand scrutiny".

The Georgian authorities reported that the Abkhaz had forced 50 Georgian families in Gali to leave Abkhazia on 26 February 2009.

On 27 February 2009, 4 Georgian citizens were captured by South Ossetia. 2 were soon freed, but 2 remained in captivity.

=== March 2009 ===
==== 2-3 March 2009 ====
On 2 March 2009, the Georgian Foreign Ministry reported that the Swiss embassy would begin issuing Russian visas to the Georgian citizens on 5 March 2009.

Deputy chief of Russia's General Staff Anatoliy Nogovitsyn stated that the remains of the pilot of a Tupolev Tu-22 bomber, shot down during the war, had been returned from Georgia. However, Nogovitsyn stated on 16 March that Georgia had only sent the DNA codes instead of the remains. Nogovitsyn told Echo of Moscow on 28 March that the remains did not equal the whole body, so lieutenant colonel Koventsov was considered the only person missing in action.

Georgian Foreign Minister Grigol Vashadze welcomed United States Secretary of Defense Robert Gates's remarks on Putin's imperialism.

The South Ossetian authorities reported that issuing of Russian passports in South Ossetia was halted and new rules of issuing the Russian passports would be adopted.

On 3 March 2009, Kommersant reported that the reconstruction works had been paused in Tskhinvali and a large part of Russian financial aid had not yet arrived in South Ossetia due to dispute between the South Ossetian and Russian authorities on the control mechanism of spending. Vice-Premier of South Ossetia said that even government employees had not received wages. One Tskhinvali resident was quoted as having commented on the economic stagnation: "If the issue is not resolved soon, there will be another war. It turns out like this: we have played our role and Russia no longer needs us?"

Panteleimon Giorgadze, father of Igor Giorgadze and leader of the Unified Communist Party of Georgia, died on 3 March 2009. Eduard Kokoity sent condolence message to the family of Giorgadze on 5 March.

Georgian Defense Minister Vasil Sikharulidze said that Georgia was not going to attack the Russian occupying forces in Abkhazia and South Ossetia and instead would pursue only the diplomatic solution.

South Ossetian ambassador to Russia, Dmitry Medoyev, declared that Tskhinvali was not interested in Georgia's "cynical" offer of financial aid for South Ossetia and accused Georgia of embezzling the western financial aid destined for South Ossetia in 1991-2008.

==== 4-8 March 2009 ====
On 4 March 2009, Eduard Kokoity claimed that Israel had resumed military supplies to Georgia and Georgia had restored its fleet by acquiring 8 military warships. He also claimed that the OSCE monitors were not neutral.

On 5 March 2009, Garry Kasparov, member of the Russian opposition, warned that Putin's regime "may relish a violent clash with a contrived enemy in hopes of building nationalistic support -- the war with Georgia this past summer may just be a prelude."

Deputy Defense Minister of Russia Vladimir Popovkin announced that after analyzing the results of the war with Georgia, Russia decided to reinforce the forces in the Southern Federal District and the Black Sea Fleet.

On 6 March 2009, member of the Russian State Duma Sergey Abeltsev said that armed hostilities were expected in the spring and Russia would build Internment camps for the Georgian POWs near the borders of Abkhazia and South Ossetia.

On 7 March 2009, South Ossetia accused Georgia of a military build-up near South Ossetia. However, Georgia rejected this allegation. Russian journalist Yulia Latynina noted the correlation between Putin's unwillingness to grant money to South Ossetia without any accountability and emergence of the South Ossetian accusations of a Georgian military build-up.

Russian president Medvedev declared in his videoblog that Russia defended its national interests in August 2008.

On 8 March 2009, Russian ammo storage exploded in occupied Akhalgori district.

==== 11-16 March 2009 ====
On 11 March 2009, Georgian Reintegration Minister Temur Iakobashvili commented on the land transfer to the Russian military in South Ossetia for 99 years that the international community would annul this decision and "Kokoity's words (about Russian bases) should not be taken seriously at all."

On 12 March 2009, Hansjörg Haber, the chief of the European Union Monitoring Mission in Georgia (EUMM), said that the EU could prolong the mandate of the EU monitors if the missions of the UN and OSCE in Georgia were ended. Haber told Echo of Moscow on 27 March that Georgia was fulfilling its commitments under the Sarkozy-Medvedev agreement, while Russia did not observe all commitments completely. Haber also said that the EU mission was checking all reports of Georgian military build-up near the administrative borders of Abkhazia and South Ossetia, but they have all turned out to be untrue.

On 15 March 2009, Polish newspaper Gazeta Wyborcza reported that Vladimir Putin was ready to deploy Russian troops to Afghanistan if NATO would not accept Ukraine and Georgia into the alliance.

On 16 March 2009, the Kommersant newspaper reported that the meeting of the commission on financing of South Ossetia of the Russian Ministry of Regional Development was postponed for the fourth time. Principal of one South Ossetian school said that Russia did not save the Ossetian people during the war, but its own regional interests and suggested that Russia did not want the reconstruction of South Ossetia because there could be a new war.

==== 17-20 March 2009 ====
On 17 March 2009, Russia granted 5 billion ruble financial aid for Abkhazia and South Ossetia. On 22 March, Abkhaz leader Sergei Bagapsh announced that the Russian money would be spent on the reconstruction of the infrastructure.

A 27-member commission composed of former American diplomats and members of the United States Congress stated that the United States did not have "a compelling security interest in expediting NATO membership for either Ukraine or Georgia at this time."

On 17 March 2009, Temur Iakobashvili commented on the beginning of the military exercises in Abkhazia that exercises could escalate into military conflict. Russian military expert Pavel Felgenhauer reiterated in an interview that Russia was planning to attack Georgia again in April–May 2009 and that Tbilisi would be captured. According to former Russian intelligence operative and defector Vladimir Volodin, Russian secret services were recruiting ethnic Georgians with criminal records and Georgian-speaking persons living in Russia who would arrive in Georgia in late March and open fire on the rally of the Georgian opposition in Tbilisi; this incident would be blamed on the Saakashvili government.

On 19 March 2009, Russia's NATO envoy Dmitry Rogozin said that the situation around Georgia's NATO membership was "funny", because Georgia's NATO membership would mean that NATO would have to recognize the independence of Abkhazia and South Ossetia; otherwise if Georgia would be accepted together with Abkhazia and South Ossetia, this would mean that NATO would have to accept the Russian military bases and brigades in two republics.

The South Ossetian foreign ministry accused Georgia of a military build-up near South Ossetia and claimed that the EU observers were complicit in allowing this. On 20 March, the Abkhaz foreign ministry accused Georgia of deploying 300-man special unit of the interior ministry in the mountains near Abkhazia for waging "provocations". Abkhaz authorities accused the EU monitors of "contributing to the aggressive intentions of Georgia" and of being "a party to the conflict."

On 20 March 2009, head of the Georgian Intelligence Service Gela Bezhuashvili declared that Russia could lose control over the North Caucasus in 1–2 years.

==== 22-31 March 2009 ====
On 22 March 2009, the Georgia national rugby union team defeated the Russian national team in Mariupol, Ukraine.

On 23 March 2009, Moskovskij Komsomolets reported that more than 100 complaints by conscript soldiers had been submitted to the Russian Military Prosecutor's Office. The Russian Defense Ministry had originally promised not to send newly recruited conscripts to the war; after the war, the ministry refused to pay the travel allowances to the conscripts, which amounted to $54 per day spent on the foreign territory. Some conscripts had never received documents proving their deployment in South Ossetia, and even some owners of such documents could not receive veteran benefits because the ministry did not recognize the August 2008 conflict as war. Russian Defense Minister Anatoly Serdyukov had cited the Russian recognition of Abkhazia and South Ossetia as reason for the cancellation of the travel allowances; Novaya Gazeta opined that according to Serdyukov, Abkhazia and South Ossetia were now Russia's territories and Serdyukov's order retroactively cancelled the payments for the foreign deployment, and at the same time changed Russia's borders.

Belarusian president Alexander Lukashenko and Abkhaz president Sergei Bagapsh held a meeting in Moscow. Abkhaz leader announced intention to purchase Belarusian cars with a total cost of 1 billion rubles. It had been reported that Abkhazia would receive 2.36 billion rubles from Russia.

On 25 March 2009, it was announced that Georgia had appealed to the Government of Japan to change Georgia's Japanese name from Russian-influenced "Grujia" to "Jorjia".

On 29 March 2009, Laurence Kogonia, head of the Gali district's interior department, accused Georgia of orchestrating the terrorist attack in Achigvara.

A trip-wire activated to the north of Dvani near South Ossetia and killed one policeman and wounded several. The second blast targeted the responding policemen. The EUMM deplored the incident. The OSCE also castigated the attack.

On 30 March 2009, Russia's UN envoy Vitaly Churkin said that Russia did not need the international recognition of Abkhazia and South Ossetia.

On 31 March 2009, Plenipotentiary Representative of the South Ossetian President for Post-Conflict Settlement Boris Chochiev accused Georgia of a military build-up in the village of Dirbi near South Ossetia.

Russia refused to give 100 billion ruble credit to Belarus. The rejection of the credit was linked to Belarusian inaction to recognize Abkhazia and South Ossetia. The Belarusian parliament did not discuss the recognition on 2 April 2009.

=== April 2009 ===
==== 1-8 April 2009 ====
On 1 April 2009, Russian president Dmitry Medvedev and US president Barack Obama met in London. They issued a joint statement saying that although "significant differences" remained in their respective assessments of August 2008 events, they understood the importance of "pursuing effective cooperation in the Geneva discussions to bring stability to the region" and "are ready to move beyond Cold War mentalities and chart a fresh start in relations between our two countries". The next day, Georgian president Saakashvili approved of the statement and ruled out "any further Russian military adventures against Georgia." Medvedev declared in London that he did not want any relationship with Saakashvili and would only communicate with the new government in Georgia.

The Russian Ministry of Internal Affairs source reported on 1 April that 60% of Russia's Thief in laws were Georgian citizens.

On 2 April 2009, Russian Deputy Foreign Minister Alexander Grushko said that Russia would not recognize Kosovo even if the European Union recognized Abkhazia and South Ossetia. Russian Foreign Ministry official Andrei Nesterenko claimed that Georgia was planning "revanche". He warned the United States and Ukraine not to send military supplies to Georgia and encourage the "aggressor".

On 5 April 2009, Russian Foreign Minister Sergey Lavrov claimed that Georgia was preparing new provocations. Lavrov said that the EU commission should establish the role of those countries that had armed Georgia before August 2008.

On 6 April 2009, Russia's NATO envoy Dmitry Rogozin criticized NATO for supporting Georgia's territorial integrity and asked why the Geneva international discussions on the status of Abkhazia and South Ossetia were held. Deputy Chairman of the State Duma Vladimir Zhirinovsky declared that NATO was preparing a war against Russia and suggested that Sevastopol would be a springboard for an attack on Russia. He said that NATO was "getting closer and closer through the traitors in Georgia."

Russian media claimed that the Georgian government began preparation for the invasion of South Ossetia to distract the Georgian opposition from the rally scheduled for 9 April 2009. It became known that the Staff of the North Caucasus Military District of the Russian Armed Forces was working on a plan of the war with Georgia. It was alleged that Abkhaz and South Ossetian militants had been planted in Tbilisi for provoking the bloodshed and the Georgian opposition would appeal to Russia for help. Russian media accused Ukraine of preparing Ukrainian Spetsnaz for dispersal of the rally of the Georgian opposition in Tbilisi.

Russian journalist Pavel Sheremet stated that the father of Irakli Alasania, the new leader of the Georgian opposition, was a close friend of Igor Giorgadze. Sheremet noted that there was Reality television show in Georgia, in which the "mad singer", member of the Georgian opposition, was sitting in the cell and demanding the resignation of Saakashvili. Russian Deputy Foreign Minister Grigory Karasin discussed the situation in Georgia amidst the backdrop of the planned opposition rally with US ambassador to Russia John Beyrle on 8 April.

==== 9-12 April 2009 ====
On 9 April 2009, the Georgian opposition held a rally on Rustaveli Avenue demanding resignation of President Saakashvili. The Russian military units in the North Caucasus were put on elevated combat alert in connection with the probable instability in Georgia and additional Russian forces were deployed in Abkhazia's Gali district bordering undisputed Georgia. Russian journalist Yulia Latynina wrote on 10 April that the "insane" Georgian opposition, who opposed Saakashvili because he had rid Georgia of Ancien Régime and was building modern Western state to the detriment of the Kremlin, was suffering from infantilism. She also wrote that Vake neighbourhood of Tbilisi was the Georgian Vendée. President Saakashvili accused the Georgian opposition of being funded by the Russian oligarchs. On the night of April 11–12, a tent camp of demonstrators near the parliament of Georgia was razed. According to some reports, Abkhaz militants were responsible for this destruction. The Georgian opposition began the blockade of the government offices on 13 April, provoking the Georgian government to contemplate using force against the opposition rally and thus Russia would be given an opportunity for intervention in Georgia. The Georgian parliament relocated to the Sheraton Grand Tbilisi Metechi Palace. On 25 April 2009, French ambassador to Georgia Eric Fournier said that the Georgian opposition was "acting against democratic constitution".

On 11 April 2009, MediaNews reported that the headquarters of the Russian 58th Army sent orders to the forces deployed in Abkhazia and South Ossetia to check the military hardware and report about their condition till 15:00 on 13 April. The forces were reportedly notified that they would receive the detailed plans of action on 14 April. Aleksandr Kolpachenko, commander of the 76th Guards Air Assault Division, had reportedly arrived in Tskhinvali on 10 April. The 58th Army received new instructions for probable war with Georgia on 15 April. Turkish media reported that additional forces from the Moscow Military District were deployed to the North Caucasus to prevent spilling of the conflict into Russia. The Turkish Air defence systems were put on elevated readiness and the Turkish Armed Forces were deployed to reinforce the Georgia–Turkey border. The Turkish Naval Forces began large-scale exercises in the Black Sea. On 23 April 2009, South Ossetian defense minister Yuri Tanaev said that the Russian forces in South Ossetia underwent rotation of troops. The Russian forces upgraded their military hardware and received new tasks. He said that there was no need to mine the border with Georgia at the moment.

On 11 April 2009, deputy defense minister of South Ossetia Ibrahim Gazseev rejected media reports of the Georgian shelling of Tskhinvali. On 12 April 2009, Eduard Kokoity declared that the Georgian army in its current condition could not resist neither South Ossetia nor the Russian forces deployed in South Ossetia. He further stated that Georgia was a failed state like Ukraine. Kokoity said that it was incorrect to label the people who had left the Georgian villages of Tamarasheni and Kekhvi as "refugees" and Georgians themselves burned the houses in these villages.

On 12 April 2009, Lithuanian Foreign Minister Vygaudas Ušackas urged Russia to refrain "from military exercises near the territorial waters of Georgia at this politically sensitive time".

==== 13-18 April 2009 ====
On 13 April 2009, pro-Putin Russian group Nashi announced that its members were driving for Tskhinvali and would join the rally of the Georgian opposition in Tbilisi. Gruziya Online agency suggested that Nashi members could try to provoke the Georgian servicemen on the Georgia–South Ossetia border and the Russian forces in South Ossetia would use force for "protecting Russian citizens". On 15 April 2009, Nashi arrived in Tskhinvali to protest against Georgian president Saakashvili. The next day, the Georgian Interior Ministry arrested one member of Nashi, who confessed on video that Nashi were planning to stage a provocation during the crossing into Georgia. On 17 April 2009, the Russian Foreign Ministry condemned the arrest of the Nashi member and warned the Russian citizens against travelling to Georgia because they could become "victims" of the "immoral provocations" by Georgia. In response, the Georgian Foreign Ministry stated that there was no threat to the Russian citizens in Georgia.

Russian journalist Tikhon Dzyadko said on 13 April that the European monitors in Georgia had told him that the South Ossetians were periodically shooting towards Georgia, but could not establish the reason because they were not allowed entry into South Ossetia. The EU monitors were also reporting to have registered the movement of the Russian military hardware inside South Ossetia in the past several days.

On 14 April 2009, Georgian president Saakashvili said that the recent Russian military buildup had been carried out in the expectation of internal unrest in Georgia and that he did not expect the resumption of armed hostilities between Russia and Georgia.

OSCE envoy Knut Vollebæk said that Abkhaz authorities were pressuring the Georgian population in Gali district.

On 15 April 2009, Russia's NATO envoy Dmitry Rogozin said that planned NATO exercises in Georgia in May 2009 were a "challenge" to the Georgian opposition, Russia, South Ossetia and Abkhazia. The next day, Russian Foreign Ministry official Andrei Nesterenko said that Russian military exercises in the North Caucasus were a warning to Georgia. Earlier, the Russian Defense Ministry had rejected the reports on increased Russian military activity near the Georgian borders as Georgian "falsehood". NATO offered Russia to participate in the exercises. NATO official stated that the planned exercises in Georgia did not involve any weapons or military hardware. On 17 April, Russian president Dmitry Medvedev threatened that NATO exercises in Georgia could cause "any type of complications". Abkhaz leader Sergei Bagapsh said that Abkhazia would hold its own military exercises in response to NATO exercises in Georgia. Rogozin suggested that there could be a provocation against American or European servicemen participating in the exercises. On 18 April, Rogozin said that NATO was planning "saber-rattling" on the territory of the recent "aggressor".

==== 20-30 April 2009 ====
On 20 April, Dmitry Rogozin announced that Russia would not participate in a NATO-Russia meeting of the Chiefs of the General Staff scheduled on 7 May if NATO did not cancel the exercises in Georgia. The US State Department stated that NATO had been discussing the planned exercises with Russia for several months. Russian ambassador to the United States Sergey Kislyak declared on 21 April that the NATO "did not draw the right conclusions" from the war in August 2008 and the NATO exercises "reinforces the Georgian government's feeling" that Georgia would become a NATO member no matter what. On 24 April 2009, Vladimir Zhirinovsky noted at the Duma session that Georgian base of Vaziani, where NATO exercises would be held, was Russian-built, and said that the Collective Security Treaty Organization (ODKB) military bases would be occupied by NATO forces in 15–20 years into the future. Zhirinovsky said that despite Russian solidarity with Armenian refugees during the Armenian genocide, now Armenia wanted to join NATO. Semyon Bagdasarov criticized Russia's ODKB ally Armenia for participating in the NATO exercises directed against Russia, South Ossetia and Abkhazia.

On 21 April 2009, the South Ossetian authorities arrested two OSCE observers "for illegal crossing of the South Ossetia's border" near Nikozi and later freed them.

On 22 April 2009, Georgian Reintegration Minister Temur Iakobashvili alleged that hungry Russian soldiers in South Ossetia were begging for food.

Automatic firearms fire was reported on the administrative border between Georgia and South Ossetia. Both sides accused each other for the incident.

On 24 April 2009, Boris Nemtsov, opposition Mayoral candidate for Sochi, criticized the decision of the election commission of Sochi to allow voting in Sochi for the residents of Abkhazia with Russian passports as electoral fraud. No resident of Abkhazia voted in Sochi on 26 April.

On 27 April 2009, leader of the Communist Party of the Russian Federation Gennady Zyuganov proposed to hold referendums on joining Abkhazia and South Ossetia with Russia.

On 29 April 2009, Luc Van den Brande declared that Russia was not fulfilling the demands of the Parliamentary Assembly of the Council of Europe, such as withdrawal of the recognition of South Ossetia and withdrawal of the Russian forces from South Ossetia.

On 30 April 2009, Russian president Medvedev signed agreements with presidents of Abkhazia and South Ossetia to deploy Russian border guards on the borders of these republics. NATO criticized the treaties as violation of the ceasefire agreements. The Russian Foreign Ministry stated that NATO's criticism of the treaties as violation of the ceasefire agreements was surprising because "Russia has not signed any ceasefire agreements with anyone in this area". The United States also criticized Russia. On 1 May 2009, the Border Service of the Federal Security Service of the Russian Federation assumed control of South Ossetia's borders.

=== May 2009 ===
==== 1-3 May 2009 ====
On 1 May 2009, Russian ambassador to Abkhazia Semyon Grigoryev announced that the Russian embassy in Sukhumi began operation.

The Georgian police arrested the South Ossetian militant who had attempted to take the Georgian policeman in the Georgian village as hostage.

On 2 May 2009, President of Armenia Serzh Sargsyan suggested that Abkhazia, South Ossetia and Adjara were made autonomous states in the Soviet era to prevent Georgia's exit from the USSR.

On 3 May 2009, it was reported that Czechia's decision to approve the Treaty of Lisbon was influenced by motivation not to fall under Russia's influence since Russia's attempt to exert influence over Georgia, Ukraine and Moldova was evident.

==== 4-5 May 2009 ====
On 4 May 2009, former member of Vostok Battalion said that the drunken Russian Generals were saying that there would be a new war with Georgia in Summer-Autumn.

Russia's UN envoy Vitaly Churkin accused Georgia of provocations and military build-up near the borders of Abkhazia and South Ossetia.

On 4 May 2009, leader of the Georgian opposition Salome Zourabichvili announced that the opposition would blockade all entrances/exits of Georgia's capital Tbilisi the next day. On 5 May 2009, the Georgian authorities announced that a military mutiny aimed at obstructing the NATO exercises was foiled. Secretly-recorded video footage was released, where one of mutineers was saying that the Georgian government officials would be assassinated and 5,000 Russian soldiers would advance to Tbilisi. The organizer, Gia Gvaladze, suggested that former military commander Giorgi Karkarashvili, ally of Georgian opposition leader Irakli Alasania, was on the side of the mutiny. According to Medianews agency, the entire Russian 58th Army was put on combat readiness No. 1 at 15:00. Alexey Ostrovsky, the Chairman of the State Duma Committee for CIS Affairs and Relations with Compatriots, proposed to hold snap presidential and parliamentary elections in Georgia. The Russian Foreign Ministry denied that Russia was responsible and called the mutiny "anti-Russian prank". According to Russian journalist Yulia Latynina, Gvaladze was a friend of Igor Giorgadze, former head of the Georgian KGB wanted by Interpol. Latynina suggested that the real masterminds behind the mutiny had convinced the Georgian opposition that the rally on 9 April 2009 would have forced Sakaashvili to resign. Member of the Russian opposition Valeriya Novodvorskaya stated that the Georgian opposition were "old provocateurs" responsible for instigating the Georgian Civil War and some of them were working for the Russian intelligence agencies. On 21 May, the Georgian Interior Ministry announced that an attempt by three organizers of the mutiny to flee to South Ossetia had been foiled. On 22 May, Georgian MP Givi Targamadze alleged that Russian oligarch Alexander Yebralidze, Putin's ally, was financing the foiled military mutiny. Ebralidze had announced his plans to become Georgia's president in Sochi in May 2009.

On 5 May 2009, South Ossetia accused Georgian special services of planting an explosive device on the Transcaucasian Highway to subvert the elections in South Ossetia.

A planned ministerial meeting of the NATO-Russia Council was cancelled by Russia on 5 May. The planned NATO exercises in Georgia was one of the reasons. Konstantin Kosachev, chairman of the State Duma Foreign Affairs Committee, said that the NATO exercises in Georgia alarmed the residents of South Ossetia and they were leaving for Russia. Kosachev said that Russia was ready for the repetition of the August war. Deputy Vice-Premier of South Ossetia Inal Pliev said that NATO and Georgia were "remnants of the past" and accused NATO of "provocations".

Russian Deputy Foreign Minister Grigory Karasin discussed the situation in Georgia with Assistant Secretary of State for European and Eurasian Affairs Daniel Fried on phone.

==== 6-7 May 2009 ====
On 6 May, member of the State Duma Sergey Abeltsev proposed to hold exercises together with Cuba and Venezuela in the Caribbean in response to the NATO exercises in Georgia. On 7 May, State Duma Chairman Boris Gryzlov criticized the NATO exercises in Georgia, which had begun on 6 May, as an attempt to restart the Cold War.

On 6 May 2009, Vitaly Churkin's allegation of a Georgian military build-up near Abkhazia and South Ossetia was rejected by Georgia's UN envoy Alexander Lomaia as "Soviet propaganda".

On 6 May 2009, former U.S. Ambassadors to Georgia William Harrison Courtney and Kenneth Spencer Yalowitz, and the former European Commission ambassador to Georgia, Denis Corboy, said that the Russian military buildup and Moscow's anger over the "unfinished business" of the August 2008 war could cause a "new tragedy" in Georgia and called on the United States to work to avoid a new conflict. Azerbaijani analyst said in May 2009 that "Russia did not accomplish its goals in the first war." Pavel Felgenhauer said that the war "is extremely possible" until late September. Lincoln Mitchell, a scholar at Columbia University, said that "there are a number of [Georgian] opposition leaders who, if they come to power, would be good" for Russia.

On 7 May 2009, Research & Branding Group and Russian Public Opinion Research Center published the results of sociological research in Russia and Ukraine. Most Russians considered the United States, Georgia and Ukraine as enemies of Russia, while the majority of Ukrainians had a positive attitude towards Russia.

In early May 2009, two Georgian high-ranking officials spying for Russia were arrested.

==== 8-14 May 2009 ====
On 8 May 2009, Russian president Dmitry Medvedev congratulated Victory Day to the Georgian people and mentioned Meliton Kantaria in his message. The next day, Russia held the victory parade in Moscow where Medvedev said in a speech that the recent conflict "confirmed the superior capability of the Russian military in real-world engagements".

On 10 May, Vladimir Putin said that NATO military exercises in Georgia did not contribute to the improvement of Russia's relations with the United States. Putin claimed that NATO exercises were supporting Georgia's "regime" who was oppressing political dissent. The NATO exercises were officially opened in Georgia on 11 May 2009. On 14 May 2009, Russian ambassador to South Ossetia Elbrus Kargiev said that Georgia was learning "the lessons of the attack" in the NATO exercises and Russia did not rule out Georgian provocations. On 19 May 2009, the South Ossetian foreign ministry expressed concern over the NATO exercises in Georgia. Six countries, originally planned to participate, had refused to participate in the exercises which began on 6 May: Armenia, Latvia, Estonia, Kazakhstan, Moldova and Serbia. On 21 May 2009, Dmitry Rogozin said that participation in the NATO exercises in Georgia was not safe for the servicemen of foreign countries, because "more dangerous provocations" by Georgia could threaten the health and life of the participants.

On 11 May 2009, Matthew Bryza said that the war in August 2008 did not begin with the Georgian attack on Tskhinvali, but several days and even a week earlier. He said that the United States had never given offensive weapons to Georgia, but now the US had to teach Georgia how to defend their remaining territory. The Georgian opposition criticized Bryza for visiting Georgia.

On 13 May 2009, it was announced that the citizens of Abkhazia whose Russian passports indicated Georgia as the place of birth, would be given new fixed passports. Abkhaz foreign minister had discussed this issue with Sergey Lavrov and Grigory Karasin.

On 14 May 2009, pro-Russian delegates from Georgia established the World Assembly of the Nations of Georgia in Sochi at the same time as Vladimir Putin was meeting with Abkhaz president Sergei Bagapsh in Sochi.

==== 15-18 May 2009 ====
On 15 May 2009, the Georgian Foreign Ministry called the Russian blocking of the extension of the OSCE mandate an "irresponsible step" and said that this meant that Russia could no longer be an author of the new European security architecture.

On 15 May 2009, Giorgi Gachechiladze, singer and member of the Georgian opposition, said that if Saakashvili's opposition came to power, they would establish friendly relations with Abkhazia and South Ossetia.

On 15 May 2009, military expert Pavel Felgenhauer gave a speech at the Carnegie Moscow Center and described the goals of Russia in the next war with Georgia, such as demilitarization and confederation of Georgia.

Georgian ambassador to the US Batu Kutelia said on 16 May that Georgia was well-equipped to respond to the threats and the Georgian defense capabilities were increasing.

On 18 May 2009, Abkhazia refused to participate in the fifth round of Geneva talks between Georgia, the US and Russia, demanding that the United Nations stop designating Abkhazia as part of Georgia in the report of the Secretary-General.

==== 19 May 2009 ====
On 19 May 2009, Mikhail Chernov, Secretary of the Movement for United Ossetia, said that a new war would begin in the summer due to alleged aggression of Saakashvili. He said that "An offensive on the Republic of Georgia will begin on all fronts" resulting in "liquidation of the unviable Georgian state". South Ossetia would gain Kazbegi Municipality and Trialeti. Chernov said that the Russian army in Armenia could help the Russian army in South Ossetia and would advance into Samtskhe–Javakheti and Trialeti. Chernov suggested that there would be Armenian self-determination in Samtskhe–Javakheti, Megrelian self-determination in Samegrelo-Zemo Svaneti and Azerbaijani self-determination in Marneuli Municipality. Georgian president Saakashvili told Corriere della Sera that Russia would start a new war against Georgia and abolish the Georgian statehood. He also said that Russia wanted to erect a "new Berlin Wall" to separate Georgia from Sukhumi and Tskhinvali. Meanwhile, former Chancellor of Germany Gerhard Schröder criticized NATO: "When NATO holds maneuvers in Georgia, in the territory where there were hostilities recently - this is stupid."

On 19 May 2009, leader of the Georgian opposition Georgy Khaindrava called on the Georgian refugees from Abkhazia to protest against Ban Ki-moon because the UN Secretary-General's report did not mention Abkhazia as a part of Georgia for the first time due to Russia's diplomatic efforts.

It was reported on 19 May that the Russian military bases in Abkhazia and South Ossetia would receive the most modern weapons such as T-90 tanks and air defense systems. Russian journalists noted that T-90 tanks were a rarity even in Russia.

It was announced on 19 May that the largest Russian military exercises would be held in the North Caucasus in June 2009, in which all brigades of the North Caucasus Military District would participate and the experience gained in Georgia in August 2008 would be refined. It was announced on 11 June that the scenario of the exercises, named Caucasus 2009, included training of the troops for action "in a mode of gradual deterioration of the situation until escalation from crisis situations to armed conflicts." The Chief of the Russian General Staff, General Nikolay Makarov, would oversee a routine regional anti-terrorist exercise for the first time. Russian military expert Pavel Felgenhauer alleged In June 2009 that the exercise was a cover to mobilize the Russian army for the invasion of Georgia which would take place "from July 10 until after President Barack Obama visits Moscow".

==== 21-31 May 2009 ====
Former Secretary of the South Ossetian Security Council Anatoly Barankevich said on 21 May that only 18 thousand people remained in South Ossetia. He further said that not a single house was built in Tskhinvali after the war and Eduard Kokoity stole the money. He said that the Kremlin could not easily remove Eduard Kokoity because Kokoity could turn to the NATO and EU.

On 22 May 2009, Nezavisimaya Gazeta (NG) reported that Abkhaz foreign minister Sergei Shamba had told NG in September 2008 that Abkhazia preferred to be assimilated by Russia. The Abkhaz opposition began demanding resignation of the President of Abkhazia because he had given the control of the state border to Russia and important strategic objects to Russian companies. On 25 May, the Abkhaz opposition complained to Medvedev and Putin about President Bagapsh and the transfer of strategic objects to Russia. On 26 May, Rosneft gained the rights to oil in Abkhazia.

On 23 May 2009, the South Ossetian opposition held a rally against President Eduard Kokoity near the State Duma in Moscow. The Russian OMON dispersed the unsanctioned rally. Dzhambolat Tedeyev accused Eduard Kokoity of establishing dictatorship in South Ossetia and embezzlement.

On 25 May 2009, the International Civil Aviation Organization announced that the flights over Abkhazia would not be allowed until Georgia decided so.

On 26 May 2009, Georgian president Saakashvili opened the Soldiers' Memorial at Mukhatgverdi cemetery in Tbilisi. He said that Georgia was forced to respond to the bombing of the Georgian villages in August 2008 and Putin provoked the war.

On 27 May 2009, Russian youth group Nashi held a rally celebrating the Russo-Georgian friendship in Moscow.

On 28 May 2009, Boris Berezovsky declared that Putin's Russia could repeat the Georgian scenario in Ukraine and annex Ukrainian territories.

UN Secretary-General Ban Ki-moon rejected the Georgian allegation that Russian pressure had influenced the UN report.

On 31 May 2009, South Ossetia accused Georgia of closing the border to prevent South Ossetian voters in Georgia from voting in the elections in South Ossetia. Georgia rejected this accusation. The South Ossetian police confiscated the computer of Spanish journalist and destroyed it because they believed it was a "bomb". The next day, the European Union stated that the elections were "illegitimate". The United States also did not recognize the elections.

=== June 2009 ===
==== 1-10 June 2009 ====
On 2 June 2009, Georgian TV channel Rustavi 2 reported that a new radar was installed on the Makhata mountain in the place of the radar destroyed during the 2008 war.

On 4 June 2009, The Washington Post observed that the 2008 war was preceded by Russian provocations and military exercises and that Russia was still stirring up tensions. The editorial concluded that although President Saakashvili had to be "skillful in sidestepping provocations along the frontier," a lot more depended on the firm stance of President Barack Obama towards Russia.

On 5 June 2009, Belarusian president Alexander Lukashenko declared that Belarus would not "sell" its position on the status of Abkhazia and South Ossetia and recalled that he had been offered $500 million by Russia. In response, Russian Foreign Minister Sergey Lavrov declared on 9 June that Russia was not begging anyone to recognize Abkhazia and South Ossetia.

On 5 June 2009, the European fact-finding mission visited South Ossetia. Plenipotentiary Representative of the South Ossetian President for Post-Conflict Settlement Boris Chochiev accused Georgia of arming and building "illegal" posts around South Ossetia. Russian Chief of the General Staff Nikolay Makarov stated that the Georgian Armed Forces exceeded their pre-war strength.

On 8 June 2009, Supreme Allied Commander Europe James G. Stavridis commented on the recent NATO exercises in Georgia that they had been held so Georgia could defend itself. On 9 June, Assistant Secretary of State for European and Eurasian Affairs Philip H. Gordon said that the United States would provide military assistance to Georgia, but this did not mean the sale of arms to Georgia.

On 10 June, Ukrainian MP Valeriy Konovalyuk claimed that Ukraine continued arms supplies to Georgia and Ukraine was putting the Russian forces on the Georgia-South Ossetia border in danger.

==== 11-17 June 2009 ====
On 11 June 2009, three blasts took place at the railway station in Zugdidi. The witness said that 3 persons were fleeing towards the Abkhaz border after the explosion.

On 12 June 2009, Rupor agency reported that after the failure of the Georgian opposition to achieve Saakashvili's resignation, Russia was planning to start the war against Georgia on 29 June 2009 - the day the Russian military exercises in the North Caucasus were scheduled to start. Russian military in Tskhinvali told RBK Daily that the war in the Caucasus could be renewed and exercises in the North Caucasus were a good opportunity to prepare for it. Konstantin Zatulin, Deputy Chairman of the State Duma Committee on CIS Affairs and Relations with Russian Compatriots, expressed hope that probable victory of the Party of Regions in Ukraine would spell an end to Ukrainian arms supplies to Georgia.

On 15 June 2009, Russia blocked the continuation of the mandate of the United Nations Observer Mission in Georgia, which was the only remaining foreign mission in the conflict zones. Although Russia had insisted to rename the mission in order to cement the separation of Abkhazia from Georgia, the West did not endorse Russia's initiative and Russia terminated the mandate. Svante Cornell commented on this, "This will enable Russia to continue to stage provocations against its small neighbor with impunity. Moscow clearly feels it did not finish what it started last August;" The New York Times opined: "whatever hopes the Russian-backed Abkhazian separatists might still retain for a semblance of international legitimacy vanishes with the withdrawal of the United Nations mission."

On 16 June 2009, Russian president Medvedev ordered to hold negotiations on military cooperation with Abkhazia and South Ossetia.

On 17 June 2009, Russian Chief of the General Staff Nikolay Makarov accused Georgia of "saber-rattling". Russian Deputy Foreign Minister Grigory Karasin said that there was a threat of a "new adventure" by Georgia and the West. Commander-in-Chief of the Russian Ground Forces Vladimir Boldyrev announced on 18 June that the deployment of Russian military bases in Abkhazia and South Ossetia was complete and the bases were ready to defend the local population from "probable terrorist attacks and direct act of aggression too". Karasin claimed that Russia was not in the state of war with Georgia, because "the war took place between Georgia and South Ossetia".

On 17 June 2009, Abkhaz foreign minister Sergei Shamba said that Abkhazia was not allowing the EU monitors into Abkhazia because the EU had an "unfriendly attitude towards Abkhazia".

On 17 June 2009, Russian Deputy Defense Minister Vladimir Popovkin said that Russia would not participate in the Ukrainian naval exercise together with Georgia.

==== 18-23 June 2009 ====
On 18 June 2009, member of the State Duma Sergey Abeltsev commented on the support of Georgia's sovereignty by Assistant Secretary of State for European and Eurasian Affairs Philip Gordon that the US official was "Gondon" (Russian word for condom) who should open a sex shop at the White House.

On 18 June 2009, Georgian officer Alik Bzhania from Ochamchire, who had fled Georgia for Russia, requested asylum in Russia. He was nicknamed by Russian media as "Georgian Glukhov". Georgian Reintegration Minister Temur Iakobashvili refused to believe the story of Bzhania. He rejected it as "very cheap provocation" of the Russian intelligence agencies. In early July 2009, it was reported that Bzhania was appointed in the Russian Defense Ministry.

Russian journalist Yulia Latynina stated on 20 June that after the departure of the international monitors, Russia could again attack Georgia and claim that Georgia was the attacker. Latynina noted that while Russia was accusing Georgia of "saber-rattling", at the same time it was Russia who was demanding the withdrawal of those international monitors who would record the fact of the first attack by Georgia. Latynina suggested that Akhalgori Municipality could be an "ideal premise" for the beginning of a new war.

On 21 June 2009, a driver of the EUMM patrol was killed by a mine in Tsalenjikha Municipality near Abkhazia. The EUMM head said that this was a "deliberate attack" on the EUMM, which was "completely unacceptable". This marked the first attack on the EUMM.

On 22 June 2009, the Georgian Interior Ministry reported that grenades were fired on a Georgian police station in Tsalenjikha Municipality from the Abkhaz side with no casualties. Soon a blast targeted the Overhead power line near the same village.

The Armenian Foreign Ministry official reported that Georgian president Saakashvili would discuss the opening of Upper Lars border checkpoint on the Georgia–Russia border during his visit to Armenia.

The International Crisis Group stated that "extensive fighting could again erupt." Pro-government Russian media intensified propaganda campaign against Georgia, claiming that Georgia was preparing a new war while Russian military exercises in the North Caucasus were being held at the same time. Andrey Piontkovsky warned that in the event of full occupation of Georgia, even the relatives of Russian-installed leader Igor Giorgadze would not be on the side of Russia. Andrey Illarionov suggested on 24 June that Russia would start the war against Georgia after 6 July 2009, the day the military exercises would end and Barack Obama would arrive in Moscow. Illarionov said that Russian insistence on the withdrawal of the UN and OSCE monitors and the terrorist attacks in the conflict zones were signs of the Russian preparation for the new war. The Times wrote that a new war was expected. Journalist witnessed South Ossetian fire on Ergneti in Georgia. On 30 June 2009, Mikhail Kasyanov, member of the Russian opposition, declared that Russia was deploying forces and weaponry to the Georgian border during the night.

==== 24-30 June 2009 ====
On 24 June 2009, South Ossetian president Eduard Kokoity awarded the South Ossetian passport to Gennady Onishchenko, the head of the Russian Federal Service for Surveillance on Consumer Rights Protection and Human Wellbeing.

On 26 June 2009, the Abkhaz parliament approved the transfer of 10.6 hectares of land to the Russian Federal Security Service.

On 26 June 2009, Armenian president Serzh Sargsyan awarded the Order of Honor to Georgian president Saakashvili in Yerevan. Russian publicist Andrey Piontovsky later argued that this was a calculated move by Russia's ally Armenia intending to cool the Russian leadership off who was preparing the second war against Georgia because a message was sent to the Russian leadership that Russia would no longer have any "privileged interests" left in the Caucasus to be defended. Apparently after this, Russian media propaganda against Georgia ceased. Alexey Ostrovsky, the Chairman of the State Duma Committee for CIS Affairs and Relations with Compatriots, commented on Armenian award to Saakashvili on 25 September 2009 that not all actions of other countries were "provocative" to Russia.

Russian military exercises Kavkaz-2009 began on 29 June 2009, which were called by Georgian Deputy Foreign Minister Alexander Nalbandov "a very dangerous provocation." Russian official from the General Staff said that the exercises would "cool fantasies of some hawks" in Georgia, who "have not rejected new military adventures in respect of Abkhazia and South Ossetia and do not give up attempts to settle the territorial issues by forceful methods." Russian envoy to NATO Dmitry Rogozin suggested that Georgia could lose more territories. Georgian Defense Minister David Sikharulidze said in July 2009 that Russia did not invite international observers to attend the military exercises, which was a violation of the Sarkozy ceasefire agreement.

On 30 June 2009, the OSCE mission in Georgia ceased operation because Russia had vetoed the extension of the mandate in December 2008.

Journalist observed that although Russia had announced that the total Russian military losses in the 2008 war were 64 killed, a detailed list containing the names was never published, which could mean that the official figures were artificially lowered than the actual death toll.

=== July 2009 ===
==== 1-3 July 2009 ====
On 1 July 2009, the Russian Foreign Ministry accused Georgia and the West of terminating the missions of the UN and OSCE in the Caucasus. The ministry claimed that the Georgian army and police were conducting maneuvers near the borders of Abkhazia and South Ossetia, which could lead to a "new surge of tensions".

On 2 July 2009, Russian soldier Dmitry Artemiev escaped from occupied Perevi near the Georgia-South Ossetia border and applied for asylum in Georgia. Georgian president Saakashvili said that Artemiev chose freedom over authoritarianism. Artermiev later said that he was constantly being trained for the probable war during his stay in the village of Perevi for 8 months. Georgia granted refugee status to Artemiev in August 2009.

Serhii Bondarchuk, the head of Ukrspecexport, said that Ukraine was continuing to deliver arms to Georgia and suggested that the Georgian military orders were keeping the jobs at the factory during the 2008 financial crisis.

On 3 July 2009, Shaun Walker (journalist) wrote for The Independent: "even if Russia is not actively seeking a new war, a minor spat or a stray bullet could lead to disastrous consequences in the region." An analyst from International Crisis Group stated that Georgians could resort to guerrilla warfare in the event of the Russian invasion. The Independent wrote on 5 July that "many worry that Russia may pop back into Georgia to finish the job it started last year. With a new incumbent in Washington, this could be more likely."

Russian journalist Mikhail Leontyev declared during his visit to South Ossetia: "I don't understand why South Ossetia needs recognition from Zimbabwe, Holland, Belgium and all sorts of different countries!." He suggested that the Russian recognition was enough for South Ossetia. He further stated: "We must understand that we are one country, and we must not carry out any parliamentary experiments on the territory of the small Tskhinvali Raion! This is the Russian Empire".

==== 4-10 July 2009 ====
On 4 July 2009, it was reported that the regime of counter-terrorist operation and curfew was established for the first time in the area of the Mount Elbrus near the Georgian border in Kabardino-Balkaria. Journalist Yulia Latynina suggested that this most likely meant that an offensive operation against Georgia was being prepared.

On 6 July 2009, American president Barack Obama arrived in Moscow. Russian president Dmitry Medvedev was reportedly told by Obama that starting a new war against Georgia would cause "grave consequences" for Russia and that the United States "would not stand aside". Obama publicly declared that Georgia's territorial integrity must be respected and "we do agree that no one has an interest in renewed military conflict".

On 8 July 2009, Abkhazia accused Georgia of restarting drone overflights over Abkhazia.

On 9 July 2009, Deputy chief of Russia's General Staff Anatoliy Nogovitsyn rejected the report of the Moscow Defense Brief that Russian friendly fire had downed 3 Russian jets in Georgia during the war in August 2008.

On 10 July 2009, last Russian ambassador to Georgia Vyacheslav Kovalenko was appointed as the ambassador to Armenia. Lenta.ru recalled that Kovalenko had called the Georgian people a "dying people" who would soon "disappear".

Russian Deputy Interior Minister Arkady Edelev accused Georgian president Saakashvili of aiding terrorism in the North Caucasus.

Estonian politician Andres Herkel declared that a new Russian intervention in Georgia could spell not the geopolitical victory for Russia, but the end of Putinism.

==== 13-21 July 2009 ====
On 13 July 2009, Georgian president Saakashvili arrived in Turkey to sign an agreement on the Nabucco pipeline. Russian journalist Matvey Ganapolsky later argued that the signing of the Nabucco agreement made Russia's probable war plans against Georgia "extremely illusory" because the new advance of the 58th Army towards Tbilisi would be seen as aggression against united Europe.

On 13 July 2009, Georgian president Saakashvili blasted his Russian counterpart Medvedev for visiting Tskhinvali. He said that this visit was "the most immoral and shameful". Georgian Reintegration Minister Temur Iakobashvili suggested that Medvedev's meeting with Eduard Kokoity was a downgrade "from the Great Eight to the Little Six" (Russian slang for underling). US State Department official Ian C. Kelly said that the Russian visit to Tskhinvali did not contribute to the regional stability. The European Union also criticized Medvedev for his visit to Tskhinvali.

Russian opposition movement Solidarnost stated on 16 July that the recent events "may mean the preparation by the authorities of our country of a new offensive military operation against Georgia" which would result in the strengthening of a police state in Russia.

Russia sent invitations to the leaders of all CIS countries except Georgia to attend the horse racing for the prize of the President of Russia scheduled on 18 July 2009. Presidents of Uzbekistan, Belarus and Ukraine were not expected to arrive in Moscow, but the leaders of Abkhazia and South Ossetia were planning to visit. Azerbaijani media reported that Russian president Medvedev was planning to offer a seat at the table of the CIS leaders to Bagapsh and Kokoity, but President of Azerbaijan Ilham Aliyev refused to sit alongside the separatists.

On 18 July 2009, Vice-Speaker of the Georgian parliament Paata Davitaia said that Russia had deployed up to 1,000 military Spetsnaz troops to Abkhazia and Russian journalists had arrived in Sukhumi media-center. He said that provocations by Russia and Abkhazia were expected. However, the Russian Ground Forces rejected this report.

On 21 July 2009, it was reported Georgia had not admitted 2 Russian diplomats, who allegedly were spies, into the country. In response, Russia expelled 2 Georgian diplomats from Moscow, including Georgian consul.

On 21 July 2009, Georgian president Saakashvili reported that the United States military assistance to Georgia now focused on "homeland defense", instead of peacekeeping operations.

==== 22-27 July 2009 ====
On 22 July 2009, the Ministry of Foreign Affairs of Belarus advised its citizens to observe the Georgian laws and visit Abkhazia and South Ossetia only from the Georgian side. The South Ossetian authorities called the Belarusian position "more than strange". Russian journalist Sergey Dorenko commented that Russia had to pursue the policy of de-sovereignization of Georgia and break Georgia into several parts with their subsequent integration into Russia.

On 22 July 2009, Vice President of the United States Joe Biden arrived in Georgia. Biden told the Parliament of Georgia that "There is no military option to reintegration" of the Russian-occupied territories and one American official accompanying Biden said that the United States would not yet arm Georgia. Biden declared in Georgia that Russia "used a pretext to invade your country". Biden's visits to Ukraine and Georgia intended to send a message of the US support to these countries. On 24 July 2009, Russian president Medvedev told NTV that Russia needed good relations with the United States and a reset attempt should not cause "deterioration of our ties with other countries or of U.S. relations with some other countries, including Ukraine and Georgia." Medvedev also said that although Russia and Georgia did not have diplomatic relations at the moment due to Saakashvili's "aggression", "feelings between nations remain". Medvedev suggested to hold a referendum on NATO membership in Ukraine. Russian Foreign Minister Sergey Lavrov commented on Biden's support of Georgia's territorial integrity that the United States would "sooner or later" recognize the independence of Abkhazia and South Ossetia. Later, it was alleged that Biden reportedly told the Georgian opposition in a closed meeting that it was Russia that the Georgian opposition had to oppose even if the president of Georgia was Mickey Mouse. Scholar Lincoln Mitchell said in August 2009 about the possible weapons deal talk between Saakashvili and Biden that the United States did not have "enough weapons to sell to Georgia -- certainly conventional weapons -- to make it able to defend itself against Russia."

On 22 July 2009, the Georgian parliament notified the CIS Interparliamentary Assembly that Georgia was terminating its membership of the assembly, which became final in January 2010.

On 23 July 2009, Russian Deputy Foreign Minister Grigory Karasin accused Georgia of planning provocations on the South Ossetian border under the guise of the peaceful march on the war's anniversary.

Assistant Secretary of State Philip J. Crowley said on 23 July that the United States would help Georgia with its defensive capabilities. On 24 July, Russia's NATO envoy Dmitry Rogozin threatened that Russia would impose sanctions on the United States if American arms were delivered to Georgia. Rogozin stated that he agreed with Saakashvili that the Berlin line was separating the Russian-controlled territories from Georgia and specified that he (Rogozin) meant the divide between "Russian democracy and Georgian totalitarianism". In response to Rogozin, US Ambassador to Russia John Beyrle said that the US would continue military cooperation with Georgia, but this did not include arms deliveries.

On 27 July, South Ossetian president Eduard Kokoity called Biden's statement on having no intention to arm Georgia "cynical". Kokoity accused the United States, Ukraine and Israel for being responsible for the genocide of the South Ossetian people. South Ossetian defense minister Yuri Tanaev accused Georgia of military activity on the border of Akhalgori District and preparation of provocations.

On 27 July 2009, the European Union prolonged the mandate of the EU mission in Georgia until September 2010. British Foreign Secretary David Miliband welcomed this decision.

==== 29-31 July 2009 ====
On 29 July 2009, the Georgian police arrested South Ossetian Major Soslan Pukhaev, responsible for the burning of the village of Kurta and killing of Giorgi Antsukhelidze in August 2008.

Commander of the Russian Airborne Forces Vladimir Shamanov did not rule out provocations on the war's anniversary in August. Plenipotentiary Representative of the South Ossetian President for Post-Conflict Settlement Boris Chochiev accused the European monitors of being accomplices to the Georgian crimes against South Ossetia.

The Georgian Foreign Ministry criticized Grigory Karasin's statement that the EU had not explained the termination of the OSCE and UN missions, saying that it was Russia who removed "eyewitnesses" to its crimes.

On 30 July 2009, the South Ossetian authorities alleged that the southern outskirts of Tskhinvali had been shelled from the Georgian village of Nikozi around midnight and this was the first shelling by Georgia since August 2008. The Georgian Interior Ministry reported that South Ossetia started shelling Nikozi at 23:30 on 29 July.

59-year old man died in a blast near Akhalgori Municipality, but his children survived with injuries. Eduard Kokoity claimed that Georgia had mined the roads near the borders of South Ossetia to prevent the return of the Georgians to South Ossetia. He also claimed that the European monitors were "turning a blind eye" to Georgian "crimes against peaceful population". Meanwhile, South Ossetian defense minister Yuri Tanaev alleged that American attempts to deploy their observers in the EU mission in Georgia "can also provoke a new conflict". The Georgian Foreign Ministry reported that when Nikozi was being shelled, the Georgian Interior Ministry attempted to contact the Russian military on the "hot line", but the Russian side did not answer.

Military exercises began in Georgia which was attended by foreign military attachés. According to the scenario, the Georgian army had to stop the enemy invasion from two directions and destroy 80% of invaders.

An explosive device was found at the Zugdidi railway station near the Abkhaz border.

On 31 July 2009, Eduard Kokoity announced that South Ossetia had territorial claims in Georgia and would demand the return of the Truso Gorge. Kokoity also announced that South Ossetia would unilaterally demarcate its borders without Georgia's consent.

Georgia banned broadcasting of foreign movies dubbed in Russian.

=== August 2009: Anniversary of the war ===
==== 1 August 2009 ====
On 1 August 2009, South Ossetian defense minister Yuri Tanaev alleged that the South Ossetian monitoring post near Eredvi was attacked from the Georgian village of Ditsi using a grenade launcher at 09:25 with no casualties. South Ossetian foreign minister Murat Jioev said, "The Georgian authorities have not learned the lessons from the events of August 2008." Jioev accused Georgia of a military build-up near South Ossetia's borders. Jioev's statement preceded the report on the Georgian shelling of Ditsi.

On 1 August 2009, the Russian Defense Ministry said that in the prior days, Georgia had fired on the South Ossetian territory and warned that Russia would "use all available means and forces" against Georgia. The US embassy in Tbilisi later reported that Russian servicemen on the ground told officials of the Georgian Interior Ministry that the Russian Defense Ministry had made the statement before the Russian forces in South Ossetia would convey the account of the attack to the ministry. The Georgian Interior Ministry official denied any Georgian firing that day. The Georgian Foreign Ministry criticized the Russian ministry's statement as "an undisguised threat". The EU Monitoring Mission in Georgia (EUMM) said its monitors in the area did not see any evidence of the Georgian attack and its monitors could not make "more complete assessment" since they were barred from entering South Ossetia. Earlier, the EUMM had said that four blasts occurred inside South Ossetia for unknown reasons. Forum.MSK.ru proposed to deploy international commission to study the alleged attacks on the South Ossetian border, otherwise the tensions would "end in a new war" because "Moscow is quite ready for a new clash that will allow it to solve internal problems".

Russian journalist Alexei Venediktov suggested that Biden's statement during his visit to Georgia that there would be no US military aid to Georgia in the event of the conflict, encouraged South Ossetia to initiate a new conflict. Venediktov noted that there was no shooting on the Abkhazia-Georgia border and suggested that Russian border post in South Ossetia could be massacred during the night, which then would be blamed on Georgia. Journalist Yulia Latynina stated that as soon U.S. Vice President Joe Biden declared that the United States would not supply arms to Georgia, the past year's scenario began repeating. Latynina criticized South Ossetian allegation that Tskhinvali had come under fire from the Georgian village of Nikozi, because Nikozi had already been wiped off the map by South Ossetia. Latynina ruled out the repetition of last year's Gleiwitz scenario because the world's attention was now focused on South Ossetia unlike in 2008. Latynina concluded that if the conflict was renewed, nobody would believe that Eduard Kokoity was responsible and instead the blame would fall on Putin.

On 1 August 2009, The Daily Telegraph reported that at least 28 Georgian policemen observing the Georgia-South Ossetia border had become casualties since the end of hostilities in August 2008. A senior Western diplomat in Tbilisi said that Russia would not start a major war against Georgia to fulfill its geopolitical objectives, but would slowly take more Georgian territory.

==== 2-3 August 2009 ====
On 2 August 2009, the Kavkaz Center reported that the Russian convoy consisting of up to 300 tanks and armored vehicles was moving in the direction of Georgia from Saratov Oblast. Russian military expert Pavel Felgenhauer was quoted as saying that the probability of the new Russian attack on Georgia was at least 80%.

Georgia reported that the Russian forces attempted on 2 August to advance South Ossetia's border deep into the Georgian territory in the Georgian village of Kveshi. Russian troops abandoned the position on the next day. The Russian Federal Security Service issued a statement saying that only the transport barriers had been installed and not the border markings.

Georgian president Saakashvili told Reuters that he would not attempt to return Abkhazia and South Ossetia by force. The next day, Chairman of the State Duma Boris Gryzlov urged "to triple vigilance" against Saakashvili.

According to the Kavkaz Center, German military expert Peter Scholl-Latour told the German TV that he had received an information from Moscow that Russia could attack Georgia in the next week.

RIA Novosti published an interview with South Ossetian president Eduard Kokoity on 3 August 2009. Kokoity said that he rejected the possibility of a new "Georgian aggression". He said he would demand ceding of the Truso Gorge (part of the Georgian region of Mtskheta-Mtianeti) to South Ossetia. He also talked about Georgian president Saakashvili: "As for that lover of wars and bellicose slogans, that international criminal, I would advise him to be careful. Considering his behavior, Georgia has a shortage of mental hospitals." However, Kokoity said later that day that Georgia had restored its military capabilities and could launch "aggression" against South Ossetia. Kokoity also announced that Russian military would hold exercises in South Ossetia beginning on 3 August; however, he did not state the end date.

Reuters published an interview, in which South Ossetian president Eduard Kokoity said that South Ossetia would join Russia. The US embassy in Tbilisi attributed Kokoity's statement on joining Russia to Kokoity's possible "lack of self-control". Lenta.ru later noted that although Kokoity had claimed that he did not need the war, he spilled that the Russian forces in South Ossetia were not enough. Lenta.ru concluded that neither Russia nor Georgia needed the war, but only the party responsible for embezzlement of the Russian financial aid for South Ossetia.

Georgian TV channel Rustavi 2 reported that the Georgian and Russian checkpoints were attacked by South Ossetians with grenades. The Georgian Interior Ministry reported that the vicinity of Plavismani was attacked at 21:30. South Ossetia accused Georgia of shelling the South Ossetian territory from Plavismani at 22:05. Meanwhile, Assistant Secretary of State Philip J. Crowley stated that the US State Department officials had contacted the Russian officials to discuss the situation in Georgia and that the United States did not see any evidence of the fire exchanges in the past days.

Russian publicist Boris Vishnevskiy wrote on 3 August: "A year after the Russo-Georgian war, it is impossible to be confident that it will not be repeated" and that "only South Ossetia is in need of a new military conflict. And for this reason it is most likely the Tskhinvali authorities that are organizing the shelling of Georgian villages, not the other way about." The US embassy in Tbilisi commented on the recent events, including Russian non-attendance of 31 July Joint Incident Prevention and Response Mechanism meeting, that they were "disturbingly provocative and chillingly echo the runup to the war in August 2008."

==== 4 August 2009 ====
It was announced that a motorcycle race from Moscow to Tskhinvali would begin on 4 August 2009, which would be dedicated to the anniversary of the war.

The European Union called on "all sides to refrain from any statement or action that may lead to increased tensions at this particularly sensitive time."

An interview with Russian Deputy Foreign Minister Grigory Karasin was published, in which Karasin accused some countries of providing armaments to Georgia under the cover of "humanitarian assistance in overcoming the consequences of the conflict." Karasin also stated that the continuous rallies of the Georgian opposition "confirm serious systemic failures in the work of the current state machine of Georgia". He criticized the US and Turkish ships for docking in the Georgian ports.

The Russian Foreign Ministry announced on 4 August 2009 that combat readiness of the Russian forces in South Ossetia was increased. The ministry noted that the statements of South Ossetian and Georgian officials contradicted each other. Mikheil Saakashvili asked the US and EU to defuse the tensions.

Eduard Kokoity fired South Ossetia's Prime Minister Aslanbek Bulatsev from his post, which was linked to Bulatsev's interest in Kokoity's management of Russian finances by media. Eduard Kokoity announced that he would close off the border with Georgia from midnight to prevent Swine influenza from spreading to South Ossetia.

South Ossetian expert said that Georgia would not start a new war against South Ossetia without the US approval and that the start of the war in South Ossetia would be the start of the World War III. Russian journalist Sergey Dorenko declared that Ukraine and Georgia had to accept the fact that the Russian Empire would be restored.

The Russian Defense Ministry official said that the Russian forces in South Ossetia were enough to "nip in the bud" Saakashvili's attempts at "aggression".

Assistant Secretary of Defense for International Security Affairs Alexander Vershbow told the United States Senate Committee on Foreign Relations that the United States "will continue to work with our international partners to oppose wider recognition of the separatist regimes." He further stated that "There has been no lethal military assistance to Georgia since the August conflict." The next day, Russian Deputy Foreign Minister Karasin rejected Vershbow's statement and instead accused the US of supplying arms to Georgia. Vershbow told Kommersant newspaper on 10 August: "We are of the view that Georgia will not be able to resolve the conflict by military means." Vershbow said that Georgia was one of the main topics during Obama's visit to Moscow.

Assistant Secretary of State Philip H. Gordon stated before the Senate Committee on Foreign Relations on 4 August that the recent events in Georgia was "all too much like the events of last summer." Gordon said that the mechanisms for the prevention of the incidents did not work and the US was working with the Georgian authorities so that Georgia would not respond to provocations.

Russian president Medvedev called his US counterpart Barack Obama to congratulate the latter's birthday and the sides discussed Georgia. In several hours, Vice-President Joe Biden and Georgian president Saakashvili had a phone conversation regarding the recent tensions.

==== 5 August 2009 ====
On 5 August 2009, it was reported that Russian Akula-class submarine was present within 200 miles of the East Coast of the United States, which was the closest approach since the end of the Cold War. Georgian media reported that the US spy satellites began monitoring Georgia's territory and a special team of the United States National Security Council was tasked with analyzing the situation. The Kavkaz Center reported that the Caucasus Emirate had intelligence that high-ranking officers in the Russian army had received secret orders regarding Georgia; decapitation strikes on Tbilisi were expected on 12–15 August 2009. Russian military expert Pavel Felgenhauer suggested that the deployment of the Russian nuclear submarines to the East Coast of the United States intended to dissuade the US from military intervention in the war. Two days later, the Kavkaz Center reported that Russia was planning to issue an ultimatum to the Georgian people to "form a responsible government" and that the new president of Georgia had already been selected by Moscow, but it was not Igor Giorgadze.

Russian Foreign Minister Sergey Lavrov accused Georgia of provocations and said that "Project Saakashvili" had completely failed. Deputy Chief of Russia's General Staff Anatoliy Nogovitsyn accused Georgia of preparing for a new "aggression". Georgian president Saakashvili told the BBC that he believed that Russia could still attack Georgia. Saakashvili told France 24 that 120 thousand Russian soldiers and 200 warplanes were mobilized near Georgia's borders.

The Abkhaz opposition held a rally on 5 August protesting a proposal on granting of the Abkhazian citizenship to the Georgian refugees, who had returned to the Gali district, and stormed the building of the Abkhaz parliament.

Eduard Kokoity accused the European monitors of approving of Georgian military activity near South Ossetia's borders, but French journalist visiting the area did not confirm this.

==== 6 August 2009 ====
On 6 August 2009, Russian Foreign Ministry official Andrei Nesterenko said that all countries must stop arms deliveries to Georgia to avert the repetition of the Georgian "aggression" against South Ossetia. The Ukrainian Foreign Ministry rejected the Russian accusation that Ukraine was the largest arms supplier to Georgia.

The South Ossetian Interior Ministry reported that the South Ossetian law enforcement servicemen adopted "the strengthened regime of service" until the end of the war's anniversary on 10 August. The governmental delegations were expected from Russia, Abkhazia and Transnistria and 100 journalists from around the world would arrive to cover the anniversary.

The Georgian government published the report on the war containing declassified materials. The next day, the Russian General Staff called the Georgian report a "fabrication".

Close to the one year anniversary of the start of the war, internet attacks occurred that targeted one Georgian user. The Twitter account of a Georgian blogger, Cyxymu came under attack, leading to a several-hour-long downtime of the entire service. One researcher said that the attack could be from Abkhazia. The blogger appealed to the President of Russia on 11 August to conduct an investigation into attacks against "the truth about the Russo-Georgian war". Chairman of the State Duma Boris Gryzlov began following the Georgian blogger in October 2009.

==== 7 August 2009 ====
On the anniversary of the war on 7 August 2009, Georgia commemorated the date. Georgian president Saakashvili urged Georgians to unite against "the liar and totally dishonest force" in a speech in Gori and said that "Georgia was the first to be hit by this force." Saakashvili further stated: "I call entire free world to help us in protecting the peace and help us not to let invader to advance further [into Georgian territories], but contrary to make them retreat." Saakashvili noted that Russia's "natural or compulsory allies" didn't recognize the independence of Abkhazia and South Ossetia. An exhibition depicting the Russian forces was held on Rustaveli Avenue in Tbilisi. Nodar Natadze burned the Russian flag on Rustaveli Avenue.

Alexey Ostrovsky, the Chairman of the State Duma Committee for CIS Affairs and Relations with Compatriots, compared Georgian president Saakashvili to "scum in Beslan" while Andrey Klimov, Deputy Chairman of the State Duma Committee on International Affairs, compared Saakashvili's policies to Adolf Hitler's "ethnic democracy".

Deputy Chief of Russia's General Staff Anatoliy Nogovitsyn said that the Russian forces were ready to capture Tbilisi in August 2008, but they didn't receive such order. The Abkhaz foreign ministry accused Georgia of preparing for a new war.

Russian Defense Ministry official Aleksandr Kirillin said that one Russian pilot lost in the 2008 war was still missing, who could be still alive in Georgia. He said that Russia had appealed to the U.S.–Russia Joint Commission on POW/MIAs. The resumption of the commission had been sanctioned on 6 July 2009 during the meeting of Russian and American presidents.

The South Ossetian authorities claimed that the car with a South Ossetian family was attacked from a grenade launcher from Georgia. The Georgian Interior Ministry rejected this allegation on 8 August 2009, instead stating that the European monitors were present in the reported place at the reported time and there was a loud thunder.

==== 8-9 August 2009 ====
On 8 August 2009, Russian president Dmitry Medvedev sent a letter to French president Sarkozy. Medvedev praised Sarkozy's "big role" in negotiation of the ceasefire agreement in August 2008. He accused Georgia of threatening to use force to restore the country's territorial integrity and of conducting military build-up on the borders of South Ossetia and Abkhazia. Georgia rejected Medvedev's accusations.

Patriarch Ilia II of Georgia held the memorial service in the name of the killed in the 2008 war at the Holy Trinity Cathedral of Tbilisi on the anniversary of the war. Patriarch Kirill of Moscow held a memorial service for the victims of the 2008 war at the Cathedral of Christ the Saviour.

South Ossetian president Eduard Kokoity inaugurated a genocide museum in Tskhinvali. The opening ceremony was attended by Abkhaz president Sergei Bagapsh. Ukrainian-made shells of the BM-27 Uragan multiple rocket launcher were on display among other items. Eduard Kokoity claimed that neither Georgia nor Ukraine were capable of being independent states and that the statehood of Abkhazia and South Ossetia was "much stronger".

Members of United Russia (Russia's ruling party), Georgian and Ossetian diasporas of Moscow visited the statue of ethnic Georgian military commander Pyotr Bagration in Moscow and laid flowers in honor of the Russian peacekeepers in South Ossetia.

Russia's NATO envoy Dmitry Rogozin claimed that Georgian president Saakashvili was a "cyborg" who was engineered in the NATO laboratory to counter Russia in the South Caucasus.

Russian president Medvedev gave medals to Russian soldiers in Vladikavkaz. Medvedev vowed retaliation against the Georgian government. Medvedev claimed that if he had not made the difficult decision to recognize Abkhazia and South Ossetia, "we all would live in another country". He also claimed that "practically all" foreign politicians privately told him that Russia "was right" in the war. Medvedev met with the residents of South Ossetia in Vladikavkaz.

Russian Prime Minister Vladimir Putin did not rule out a new war allegedly to be started by Georgia.

On 9 August 2009, Russian bikers arrived in Tskhinvali and held a theatrical performance in memory of the victims of the war.

==== 10-20 August 2009 ====
On 10 August 2009, Russian president Medvedev proposed a new law regarding the use of the Russian Armed Forces abroad to the State Duma and cited the August 2008 war as reason.

Vladimir Putin visited Abkhazia on 12 August and said in Sukhumi that Abkhazia "doesn't need to be recognized by any country other than Russia." Putin promised to spend 15 billion rubles on security of Abkhazia in 2010. Putin told the Abkhaz opposition that Russia was not interfering in Abkhazia's internal affairs. Putin commented on the blast in Gagra that it was an "echo of the war". There was a second blast in Sukhumi several hundred meters from the restaurant where the Russian delegation was present. However, by that time Putin had already left Sukhumi. Newborn twin babies born in the Sukhumi maternity hospital during Putin's visit that day were named Vladimir and Dmitry after Putin and Medvedev. The Georgian Foreign Ministry condemned Putin's visit as a "challenge" to the international order. The United States and the European Union criticized this visit.

On 14 August 2009, Shota Utiashvili, Georgia's Interior Ministry representative, said that the South Ossetian side had confessed to the shelling of the Georgian villages.

On 15 August 2009, American military trainers arrived in Georgia to prepare Georgian troops for Afghanistan. US military instructors were deployed to Georgia for the first time since the 2008 war. Georgian Defense Minister Vasil Sikharulidze said on 21 August that the joint exercises would enable the Georgian forces to gain skills for repelling the Russian aggression. The Pentagon stated that the exercises were not aimed against Russia.

On 18 August 2009, the Georgian withdrawal from the CIS was finished. The members of the Federation Council of Russia commented that Georgia's withdrawal would only hurt Georgia itself.

The Georgian Football Federation threatened to complain to the FIFA if Tskhinvali football club was allowed to compete in the Russian Premier League.

On 20 August 2009, Abkhaz authorities threatened they would respond to Georgian detaining of ships visiting Abkhazia. Abkhaz foreign minister Sergei Shamba suggested that Abkhazia would engage in piracy and arrest ships entering the Georgian territorial waters. The Border Service of the Federal Security Service of the Russian Federation announced on 28 August that the Russian Federal Security Service would protect the ships in the territorial waters of Abkhazia from the Georgian border guards. Georgia had arrested 23 ships visiting Abkhazia in 2009.

A newborn baby in Tskhinvali was named Genocide.

==== 25-31 August 2009 ====
On 25 August 2009, the South Ossetian interior ministry was put on alert because Georgia allegedly was preparing the terrorist attacks in South Ossetia.

On 26 August 2009, General Nikolay Makarov, the Chief of the Russian General Staff, announced that Russia reduced the number of the Russian forces deployed in Abkhazia and South Ossetia to 1700 servicemen in each republic.

On 26 August 2009, Abkhazia celebrated the first anniversary of the Russian recognition of independence. The Abkhaz leadership laid flowers at the Monument in Sukhumi dedicated to 113 Russian peacekeepers killed in Abkhazia in 1994-2008. Abkhaz foreign minister Shamba thanked Russian Foreign Minister Lavrov in a letter and also congratulated his South Ossetian counterpart Murat Jioev. South Ossetian president Eduard Kokoity was visiting Moscow. Kokoity signed new treaties with Russia. The Dzuarikau–Tskhinvali pipeline was launched. Putin and Kokoity held a joint press-conference where Kokoity thanked Putin for ordering the construction of the gas pipeline in 2006. Putin claimed that "Russia is also supporting Georgia." Kokoity said that he was not bothered by non-recognition by the international community and the Russian recognition was "the most important". Putin commented on the non-recognition of South Ossetia by the international community that the majority of the international community did not have a real sovereignty and were fulfilling the political will of the one superpower - the United States. Putin claimed that Russia had not asked anybody to recognize South Ossetia and that the Nicaraguan recognition was a "complete surprise".

On 27 August 2009, Valery Evnevich, the head of the Main Directorate for Combat Training of the Russian Ministry of Defense, announced that the Russian Army would begin training for the combat in the mountains near the Georgian border in 2010 and the training would incorporate the experience of the war with Georgia.

Georgian president Saakashvili appointed Deputy Defense Minister Bacho Akhalaia as Defense Minister of Georgia. Saakashvili stated that Akhalaia had been ordered in Summer 2009 to construct Defense line around Tbilisi to deter the Russian invasion.

The Georgian National Communications Commission fined the Russian TV channels for illegal broadcasting in the occupied territories. REN TV, NTV, TV Centre, Russia-1 and Russia-K were each fined 50,000 Georgian lari. REN TV declared that its signal was illegally transmitted into South Ossetia without the company's permission. The commission again fined the Russian TV companies for 500,000 lari each on 4 December 2009.

On 28 August 2009, one deputy commander of the unit of the North Caucasus Military District was found guilty of spying for Georgia by the military court. He had been arrested in the Summer of 2008. The prosecutor of the North Caucasus Military District said that the case of Mikhail Khachidze was the most appalling case of treason in the last 50 years in Russia. The Supreme Court of South Ossetia found one serviceman of the South Ossetian border service guilty of spying for Georgia on 31 August.

The Georgian Interior Ministry reported that Ganmukhuri was fired upon from Abkhazia and two policemen were wounded; the Abkhaz denied responsibility for the attack.

On 31 August 2009, the Georgian Foreign Ministry stated that Kokoity's intention to form a union state with Russia was "fantasy".

=== September 2009 ===
==== 1-9 September 2009 ====
On 1 September 2009, the Russian Black Sea Fleet ships based in Ochamchire were put on combat alert.

On 2 September 2009, Abkhaz president Sergei Bagapsh ordered to destroy all Georgian vessels entering the territorial waters of Abkhazia and accused Georgia of "piracy". Georgian Reintegration Minister Temur Iakobashvili said that Bagapsh was "bluffing" because Abkhazia did not have technical means to attack vessels, but Russia did.

Deputy Chief of Russia's General Staff Anatoliy Nogovitsyn said that the Georgian Armed Forces in its current condition were not capable of repeating August 2008. The South Ossetian foreign ministry accused Georgia of a military build-up near South Ossetia.

On 3 September 2009, Tbilisi City Court rejected a lawsuit by Nino Burjanadze, the leader of the Georgian opposition, regarding President Saakashvili's statement that Nino Burjanadze was being financed by Russia.

On 4 September 2009, the Georgian National Communications Commission gave $600 thousand fine to Russian company MegaFon for illegally operating in Abkhazia and South Ossetia.

On 5 September 2009, the Russian Foreign Ministry claimed that the Georgian border guard had captured the Turkish tanker ship in the neutral waters by presenting themselves as the Russian servicemen. Georgia declared that the Georgian border guards did not use the deception during ship's detention and that the arrest did not concern Russia in any way.

On 6 September 2009, there was a blast on Georgian railway near the Abkhaz border. On 15 September, an explosion took place at railway station in Zugdidi. Georgian Reintegration Minister Temur Iakobashvili stated that RDX had been used in the explosion like in the 1999 Russian apartment bombings. On 21 October, a blast damaged oil train near Poti, which was derailed.

On 7 September 2009, Sergei Bagapsh said that Abkhazia had territorial claims in Georgia near the border of the Gali district.

On 9 September 2009, 48 countries at the UN General Assembly supported a resolution urging for the return of all refugees to South Ossetia and Abkhazia, with only 19 being against it. Russia had criticized the resolution project and unsuccessfully attempted to block it from being proposed for voting. Armenia and Belarus voted against, while Azerbaijan and Ukraine supported the resolution. The Georgian Foreign Ministry welcomed the resolution.

==== 10-19 September 2009 ====
On 10 September 2009, President of Venezuela Hugo Chávez announced the Venezuelan recognition of Abkhazia and South Ossetia as independent states, making it the third UN member to support South Ossetian independence. The Georgian Foreign Ministry condemned this move and said that Chavez was the "dictator of Venezuela". The Georgian Labour Party, the Georgian opposition party, demanded the resignation of Saakashvili in order to halt the process of the recognition. The Georgian Labour Party had earlier predicted the recognition of Abkhazia by the Latin American countries. Hugo Chavez said that Russia promised to give $2.2 billion credit to Venezuela.

On 11 September 2009, it was reported that Georgia had collected 70 signatures supporting the proposal to strip voting rights from the Russian delegation at the Parliamentary Assembly of the Council of Europe.

On 15 September 2009, the Coast Guard of the Border Service of the FSB announced that it would arrest ships violating Abkhazia's territorial waters. On 23 September, Georgia decided to submit a lawsuit against Russia to the International Tribunal for the Law of the Sea.

The Russian, Abkhaz and South Ossetian defense ministers signed military cooperation treaties. The Staffs of the Russian military bases in Abkhazia and South Ossetia would be located in Gudauta and Tskhinvali respectively.

On 16 September 2009, a mass public Book burning took place in Tskhinvali. About a third of the destroyed books were Georgian. NEWSru recalled how the Nazis burned the books in Germany.

==== 20-30 September 2009 ====
On 21 September 2009, United States Secretary of State Hillary Clinton met with the Georgian president in New York City. Assistant Secretary of State for European and Eurasian Affairs Philip H. Gordon told journalist that Clinton "made clear to the Georgians that we would continue to work with other members of the international community so that other countries wouldn't recognize [Abkhazia and South Ossetia] as well".

On 23 September 2009, Russian president Medvedev addressed the UN General Assembly. He criticized Georgia. On 24 September, Georgian president Saakashvili compared the Russian occupation of Abkhazia and South Ossetia with the Berlin Wall in his address to the UN.

On 24 September 2009, the blast took place with no casualties near the village of Ergneti, south of Tskhinvali, 40 minutes before the talks between the Georgian, South Ossetian, and Russian representatives. The EUMM chief condemned the incident as "a dangerous provocation" directed against the talks in Ergneti.

Vice-Speaker of the Georgian parliament Paata Davitaia alleged that three Russian submarines had docked in Ochamchire, Abkhazia. Russia rejected this allegation.

The Prosecutor General's Office of the Russian Southern Federal District stated that illegal attempts to import weapons and ammunition from the territory of Abkhazia and South Ossetia had recently increased in numbers.

On 29 September 2009, an opinion piece by Geopolitika stated that Russia could completely occupy Georgia because the international community, including the United States, had practically abandoned Georgia. The trust-building mission of the EU monitors was impossible to fulfil because the real conflict was between Russia and Georgia, not between Georgia and new pro-Russian entities established in Georgia.

Hansjörg Haber, the head of the EU mission in Georgia, told Echo of Moscow radio station on 29 September that when the EU monitors arrived in Georgia in 2008, all sides of the conflict had been expecting the resumption of armed hostilities, but this was no longer the case. Haber said that General Makarov's August 26 statement was a signal of détente. He said that Georgia was not violating the agreements and was not conducting a military build-up near South Ossetia's borders.

Parliamentary Assembly of the Council of Europe called on Russia to observe its commitments, such as allowing the return of displaced persons. The resolution stated that "the sole guarantee" that "continuing tension and provocations along the administrative boundaries of South Ossetia and Abkhazia [...] will not escalate into renewed fighting and hostilities is the immediate unrestricted access of international monitors to both sides of the administrative boundaries". On 1 October, the majority of the PACE delegates voted to retain the voting rights of the Russian delegation. The votes of Ukraine and the United Kingdom were almost evenly divided.

=== October 2009 ===
==== 1-15 October 2009 ====
On 1 October 2009, South Ossetia accused Georgia of opening fire on the South Ossetian village of Diseu, while the Georgian police reported that it was South Ossetia that had opened fire on the Georgian villages.

On 2 October 2009, Belarusian president Alexander Lukashenko claimed that attacks on Belarus by Russian state-controlled media hindered the Belarusian recognition of Abkhazia and South Ossetia. Lukashenko also noted that all CIS countries had refused to recognize the new republics.

Russian Foreign Minister Sergey Lavrov declared that Russia would not recognize Northern Cyprus in exchange for the Turkish recognition of Abkhazia. Lavrov signed an agreement in Sukhumi establishing visa-free regime with Abkhazia.

On 5 October 2009, Georgian metropolitan bishop Gerasim visited Moscow and met with the Russian Orthodox Church officials. He declared that the Russian Orthodox Church was not recognizing the independence of the churches of Abkhazia and South Ossetia.

On 12 October 2009, the Border Service of the FSB announced that 20 military camps for the border guards would be built in South Ossetia by the Chechen workers.

On 13 October 2009, Alexander Bortnikov, the director of the Federal Security Service, accused Georgia of aiding Al-Qaeda in sending terrorists to Chechnya. Georgian parliamentarians rejected the accusation. The Georgian Foreign Ministry stated that Russia's "utterly false" accusation intended to cover up "the fact that the conflict raging in the North Caucasus has entered its most acute stage." In late October 2009, Georgian media alleged that Russia was preparing the saboteurs for the deployment to Georgia's Pankisi Gorge, which would then raid the North Caucasus and Russia would use these raids as a pretext for the military operation against Georgia.

On 14 October 2009, Zbigniew Brzezinski declared if Ukraine and Georgia do not hold out, Russia would once again turn into an empire.

On 14 October 2009, Nikolai Patrushev, the Secretary of the Security Council of Russia, announced that a new Russian military doctrine would allow the use of nuclear weapons in a regional and even local war against the states who would commit aggression against Russia and Russia's allies.

An explosion targeted high-voltage power line tower in Khashuri Municipality. Georgian governor of Shida Kartli Vladimir Vardzelashvili suggested that the South Ossetians could be responsible for this attack.

==== 16-31 October 2009 ====
On 16 October 2009, the Russian army soldier was found guilty of spying for Georgia from February 2008 till November 2008.

On 19 October 2009, Georgian Deputy Foreign Minister Alexander Nalbandov declared that the visit of Assistant Secretary of Defense for International Security Affairs Alexander Vershbow to Georgia was "a message to Russia". Russian political expert Leonid Ivashov commented on Vershbow's visit that Vershbow was "neutralizing" pro-Russian Georgian opposition.

On 21 October 2009, Radio Free Europe/Radio Liberty announced plans to begin broadcasting in Russian in Abkhazia and South Ossetia. Abkhaz authorities threatened that they would block signal of the "Georgian scam".

On 28 October 2009, the Georgian Foreign Ministry gave a protest note to the Swiss ambassador regarding 16 detained Georgian woodcutters accused of illegal crossing of South Ossetia's border. The woodcutters were released on 30 October. The South Ossetian authorities stated that they wanted good relations with Georgia.

On 29 October 2009, anonymous Russian military sources reported that the number of the Russian forces deployed in the North Caucasus would be increased for repelling the "Georgian aggression". The number of military units would quadruple.

Tbilisi City authorities decided to name one street in Vake District of Tbilisi after the murdered Russian journalist Anna Politkovskaya.

On 29 October 2009, the South Ossetian authorities freed 5 Georgian citizens held for "violation of the South Ossetian border".

President of Ecuador Rafael Correa refused to recognize Abkhazia and South Ossetia during his visit to Russia. Russia did not grant $200 million credit to Ecuador.

=== November 2009 ===
==== 1-11 November 2009 ====
On 3 November 2009, the Russian State Duma did not support an initiative by Semyon Bagdasarov to strip Georgian Foreign Minister Grigol Vashadze of his Russian citizenship. Vashadze announced the next day that he was voluntarily leaving his Russian citizenship and had returned his Russian passport.

On 5 November 2009, Aleksandr Shlyakhturov, the director of the GRU, said that Georgia was refusing to recognize to Abkhazia and South Ossetia and therefore could start a new war.

On 8 November 2009, Georgian president Mikheil Saakashvili called the Russian forces building barbed wires along the Georgia-South Ossetia border "dinosaurs".

On 9 November 2009, the Russian intelligence accused the United States of offering more than $100 million weaponry to Georgia. On 10 November, General Nikolay Makarov, the Chief of the Russian General Staff, said that foreign arms were being supplied to Georgia and Georgia's military capabilities far exceeded the August 2008 strength. The Georgian Foreign Ministry declared that Russia was waging propaganda war to justify another attack on Georgia. On 11 November, Russian Foreign Minister Sergey Lavrov accused "certain countries" of continuing arms supplies to Georgia.

==== 13-19 November 2009 ====
On 13 November 2009, Hansjörg Haber, the chief of the EUMM, announced that the European Union was planning to monitor the military situation in Abkhazia and South Ossetia via satellites because the EU monitors did not have access to these territories. Abkhaz defense minister Mirab Kishmaria declared that the satellite monitoring meant that Georgia was being prepared for a new "aggression". The Georgian Foreign Ministry confirmed on 21 December 2009 that Georgia was receiving information from the EU satellites.

On 15 November 2009, Abkhazia adopted Russia's international phone code +7.

On 16 November 2009, Gazeta.ru reported that Vladimir Putin had declared at the birthday party of Yevgeny Primakov that reunification of Georgia with Abkhazia and South Ossetia was possible. Some sceptics interpreted Putin's declaration as indicating that Russia could recreate the Soviet Union and take back Crimea.

On 17 November 2009, a delegation of the National Assembly of the Republic of Belarus arrived in Georgia to study the question of the recognition of Abkhazia and South Ossetia. Georgian scholar explained to Belarusians that the unification of medieval Georgia began in Abkhazia. Belarusian parliamentarians also met with Dmitry Sanakoev, pro-Georgian president of South Ossetia in exile, and the Georgian officials. Different Belarusian delegations visited Abkhazia and South Ossetia. The Belarusian delegation also met with the Georgian refugees from Abkhazia and they became upset.

On 18 November 2009, the EU-Russia summit was held in Stockholm. Russian president Dmitry Medvedev declared that the only disagreement between Russia and the EU was regarding Georgia's territorial integrity.

On 19 November 2009, the Georgian Foreign Ministry sent a protest note to Russia regarding November 17 visit of the Russian government delegation to Tskhinvali.

==== 20-30 November 2009 ====
Russian Prime Minister Vladimir Putin and Georgian president Mikheil Saakashvili arrived in Ukraine. Putin declared during a meeting with his Ukrainian counterpart Yulia Tymoshenko that Ukrainian president Viktor Yushchenko should dine with Georgian president Saakashvili without his tie, otherwise Saakashvili would eat Yushenkos's tie. Saakashvili said that Putin's joke was offensive to the Russian people.

On 21 November 2009, Swedish Foreign Minister Carl Bildt declared that Russia did not fulfil the Sarkozy-Medvedev agreement and the government of South Ossetia were not independent authorities.

Russian anti-Kremlin journalist Yulia Latynina stated that if the Georgian opposition came to power, "it will be an absolute catastrophe" for Georgia.

On 23 November 2009, Eduard Kokoity declared that the Georgian march on Tskhinvali on 23 November 1989 was the beginning of the South Ossetian struggle for national liberation.

On 24 November 2009, Russian president Medvedev told Belarusian journalists that he had never asked Belarus to recognize Abkhazia and South Ossetia.

In mid-November 2009, the opposition members of the parliament of Peru proposed to consider the recognition of Abkhazia and South Ossetia. Georgian Reintegration Minister Temur Iakobashvili said that as soon as the countries of Latin America experienced financial troubles, they were beginning to consider the recognition in exchange for the Russian money.

By 26 November, the South Ossetian delegation attended 36th session of the Parliamentary Assembly of the Union State of Russia and Belarus.

On 26 November 2009, Georgia expressed concern over the sale of Mistral-class amphibious assault ship to Russia by France, which would be deployed in the Black Sea. Commander-in-Chief of the Russian Navy Vladimir Vysotsky had stated in September 2009 that if Russia had Mistral in August 2008, the operation against Georgia would be finished in 40 minutes instead of 26 hours.

On 27 November 2009, the Georgian Foreign Ministry stated that the killing of an ethnic Georgian refugee from Abkhazia in Moscow by the Russian policemen proved that xenophobia was a common phenomenon in Russia.

==== 4 Georgian teenagers ====
On 4 November 2009, four Georgian underage teenagers were detained by South Ossetia near Tskhinvali. The EUMM stated concern on 8 November. On 13 November 2009, the EU ambassadors met with Georgian Reintegration Minister Temur Iakobashvili to discuss the situation in the conflict zones. EU envoy Peter Semneby said that the EU "regrets" the incident involving 4 teenagers. On 17 November, the Ministry of Justice of Georgia appealed to the European Court of Human Rights to compel Russia to release detained teenagers. On 18 November, Georgian president Mikheil Saakashvili informed US Vice-President Joe Biden on 4 Georgian teenagers kidnapped by South Ossetia.

On 27 November, Council of Europe Commissioner for Human Rights Thomas Hammarberg began negotiation between Tskhinvali and Tbilisi on the release of the jailed teenagers who had been accused of illegal possession of explosives. 2 Georgian teenagers were released on 2 December 2009 after Georgia had released 5 arrested South Ossetians. The South Ossetian court tried Georgian teenagers under the Criminal Code of Russia for illegal crossing of Russia's border. South Ossetian official Boris Chochiev alleged that Georgian teenagers had been promised 40,000 Georgian lari each for the terror attacks in South Ossetia.

Several Georgian activists travelled to Tskhinvali on 16 December 2009 to discuss the liberation of remaining 2 Georgian teenagers from Tskhinvali jail. On 19 December, Eduard Kokoity announced during his meeting with Zurab Nogaideli, leader of the Georgian opposition, that he would pardon Georgian teenagers to express his "gratitude" for Nogaideli's visit to South Ossetia. Kokoity issued a pardon and 2 Georgian teenagers were freed on 19 December along with another Georgian teenager captured in July 2009.

=== December 2009 ===
==== 1-9 December 2009 ====
On 2 December 2009, Albert Jussoev, the leader of the South Ossetian opposition, said that only 16-18 thousand people remained in South Ossetia due to poor economic conditions and Eduard Kokoity was responsible for this.

The Russian Foreign Ministry raised concern over the rights of Russian minorities in Georgia and Ukraine. The next day, the Russian Foreign Ministry declared that the International Court of Justice did not have jurisdiction over the war in 2008.

On 3 December 2009, Russia's NATO envoy Dmitry Rogozin claimed that Georgia had "completely" rearmed and accused President Saakashvili of retaining plans of the war against Abkhazia and South Ossetia.

On 4 December 2009, Secretary of State Hillary Clinton discussed Georgia during her meeting with the Russian Foreign Minister in Brussels.

On 5 December 2009, member of the Russian opposition Valeriya Novodvorskaya denied that she had been granted the Georgian citizenship. She said that if Saakashvili had not resisted the Russian invasion in August 2008, KGB officer Igor Giorgadze would have been Georgia's president. Novodvorskaya stated in February 2010 that the actions of the Georgian opposition were an apparent invitation for Russian tanks to invade Tbilisi. She said that Igor Giorgadze was living in state dacha near Moscow.

By 8 December 2009, leader of the Georgian opposition Goga Khaindrava accused Georgian president Saakashvili of being a drug addict. Russian president Vladimir Putin used a similar allegation in 2022 to demonize the leader of the resistance against the Russian invasion. Putin accused Ukrainian president Volodymyr Zelenskyy of being a "narkoman" - immoral drug addict.

On 9 December 2009, Russian president Dmitry Medvedev said that Russia wanted relations with the Georgian people, not with the Saakashvili government, and supported resumption of economic contacts with Georgia. It was announced that the only border crossing on the Russia-Georgia border would be opened for transit.

==== 10-19 December 2009 ====
On 10 December 2009, Kieren Keke, the Foreign Minister of Nauru, met with his Russian counterpart Sergey Lavrov in Moscow to discuss $50 million financial aid for Nauru. Keke arrived in Tskhinvali on 12 December and announced readiness to recognize South Ossetia. On 15 December, Nauru recognized and established diplomatic relations with Abkhazia; on the following day it recognized South Ossetia.

South Ossetia decided to unilaterally become a party to the Vienna Convention on Diplomatic Relations although South Ossetia was not a member of the United Nations.

On 13 December 2009, Georgia paused Russian gas transit to Armenia because explosive devices had been found on the gas pipeline in Ingushetia.

On 14 December 2009, the European Union declared that the EU did not recognize 2009 Abkhazian presidential election as legitimate. Russian president Medvedev congratulated Sergei Bagapsh on his victory.

On 17 December 2009, journalist asked NATO General Secretary Anders Fogh Rasmussen in Moscow whether his meeting with the Russian leadership meant that NATO was ready to compromise on Georgia, to which Rasmussen responded that this was not the case. The Russian president met with the NATO Secretary General for the first time since August 2008.

==== 21-31 December 2009 ====
On 21 December 2009, 25-year old Russian soldier stationed in Perevi defected to Georgia. Soldier Vitaly Khripun witnessed that the Russian special services were engaged in the psychological processing of the South Ossetian population. Khripun said in January 2010 that the Russian servicemen could do anything and then blame the Georgian border patrol for the incident.

On 22 December 2009, Dagestan branch of the Federal Security Service accused Georgia of preparing terrorists for deployment to Russia.

Senator Richard Lugar called on the governments of the United States and Europe to rearm Georgia, which had been left defenseless by the 2008 war. Six US Senators, including John McCain, sent a letter to the French ambassador to the US expressing concern over the sale of Mistral to Russia and noting that Russia could have used such ship against Georgia.

On 23 December 2009, Zurab Nogaideli, the leader of the Georgian opposition, visited Russia for the third time since October 2009 and met with Vladimir Putin and other Russian high-ranking officials. Nogaideli had very low support in Georgia and the commentators stated that Russia would definitely lose by openly betting on Nogaideli.

Georgian president Saakashvili said in an interview with Echo of Moscow radio station that an attempt of the Russian leadership to recreate Andropov's Soviet Union in South Ossetia, Abkhazia and Transnistria was doomed. Saakashvili also said that Russian preparation of the intervention in Crimea was not a secret to anyone in the world and Ukraine.

On 24 December 2009, Chechen leader Ramzan Kadyrov said in an interview with Reuters that Georgia and Ukraine were "illness" of Russia which had to be destroyed. Kadyrov accused the West of attempting to dissolve the Russian Federation. Kadyrov also said that Russia "must go on the offensive". The Ukrainian Foreign Ministry expressed concern over Kadyrov's remarks.

On 25 December 2009, the Abkhaz parliament gave permission to transfer land plots in Gali and Gulripshi Districts to the Border Service of the Russian FSB. On 27 December, the Georgian Foreign Ministry condemned the exploration of the shelf of Abkhazia by Rosneft.

On 27 December 2009, Georgian president Saakashvili announced that even children and women would have to fight in the event of the war and Georgia "must have half a million people" who would be "a stronghold of resistance".

On 28 December 2009, South Ossetian ambassador to Russia Dmitry Medoyev declared that Georgia was buying "not rusty Ukrainian tanks and infantry fighting vehicles, but modern warfare systems."

The Russian Ministry of Transport allowed the flights of Georgian Airways to Moscow and Saint Petersburg, which would mark the first direct flights between Russia and Georgia since 2006.

On 29 December 2009, it was reported that Georgia was considering the abolition of Russian military ranks (such as Yefreytor, Michman, Praporshchik) in the Georgian army.

On 30 December 2009, Russian president Medvedev congratulated on the upcoming new year to the leaders of the CIS, Abkhazia and South Ossetia, but ignored Georgia. The South Ossetian president congratulated to the leaders of Nicaragua, Venezuela and Nauru.

==== Destroyed memorial in Kutaisi ====
On 16 December 2009, Alexey Ostrovsky, the Chairman of the State Duma Committee for CIS Affairs and Relations with Compatriots, suggested that Saakashvili's decision to demolish the Glory Memorial dedicated to the fallen soldiers in the Soviet-German War and instead construct a new Georgian parliament building in its place in Kutaisi was immoral. The Russian Foreign Ministry stated that Georgia did not respect the defenders of the homeland. In response, the Georgian Foreign Ministry criticized the Russian Foreign Ministry for the "bad habit" of interfering in the internal affairs of foreign states. Political movement Young Russia held a rally near the Georgian embassy in Moscow on 19 December.

On 22 December, Vladimir Putin proposed to recreate the destroyed memorial in Moscow. Zurab Nogaideli, leader of the Georgian opposition, welcomed Putin's initiative and announced that the Georgian opposition would soon come to power and recreate the destroyed memorial in Kutaisi. On 24 December, Deputy Chairman of the Government Sergei Ivanov compared the Georgian government with the Taliban. Russian journalist Yulia Latynina noted on 25 December that nobody in Russia had condemned the destruction of the Soviet memorial and the Russian Orthodox church in Uzbekistan in November 2009 in contrast to the scandal caused by the destruction of the Georgian memorial. On 29 December, Georgian Reintegration Minister Temur Iakobashvili proposed to exchange Stalin's statue in Gori and the Memorial of Glory for Abkhazia and South Ossetia.

In December 2010, Vladimir Putin and Nino Burjanadze, leader of the Georgian opposition, opened a new monument dedicated to victory over fascism on Poklonnaya Hill in Moscow.

== See also ==
- Georgia–Russia relations
- Georgia–European Union relations
- Georgia–NATO relations
- Georgia–United States relations
- Russia–United States relations
- NATO–Russia relations
