= Rules of engagement =

Internal limits, authorizations and directives on use of force in combat

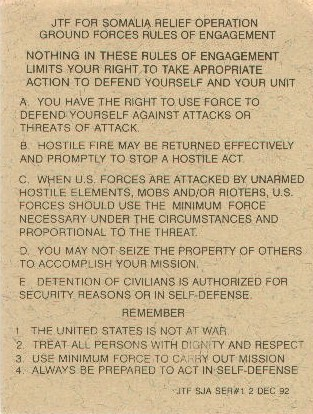
Rules of engagement for Operation Provide Relief, 1992

Rules of engagement (ROE) are the internal rules or directives afforded military forces (including individuals) that define the circumstances, conditions, degree, and manner in which the use of force, or actions which might be construed as provocative, may be applied.

They provide authorization for and/or limits on, among other things, the use of force and the employment of certain specific capabilities. In some nations, articulated ROE have the status of guidance to military forces, while in other nations, ROE constitute lawful command. Rules of engagement do not normally dictate how a result is to be achieved, but will indicate what measures may be unacceptable.

While ROE is used in both domestic and international operations by some militaries, ROE is not used for domestic operations in the United States. Instead, the use of force by the U.S. military in such situations is governed by Rules for the Use of Force (RUF).

An abbreviated description of the rules of engagement may be issued to all personnel. Commonly referred to as a "ROE card", this document provides the soldier with a summary of the ROE regulating the use of force for a particular mission.

== Legal aspects ==
Since it constitutes “an operational modality of the use of armed force permitted under international law and not prohibited by domestic law”, no rules of engagement may render lawful conduct that is otherwise unlawful (e.g., firing upon an ambulance) under international humanitarian law. Rules of engagement “may instead authorize the use of force made necessary by an act of self-defence of the State, even where, in the specific case, the military personnel participating in the mission are not themselves the object of an offensive action. The same considerations apply where an intervention takes place in support of a State engaged in a civil war, provided that such intervention is lawful".

== Authoritative sources ==
While many countries have their own rules of engagement documents, many others do not. There are two primary international rules of engagement manuals that are internationally available: NATO ROE Manual MC 362-1 (restricted to NATO and Partnership for Peace countries); and the San Remo Rules of Engagement Handbook, which is freely available to all on the International Institute of Humanitarian Law (IIHL) website. Created for the IIHL by Commander Alan Cole, Major Phillip Drew, Captain Rob McLaughlin and Professor Dennis Mandsager, the San Remo ROE Handbook has been translated from its English original into French, Chinese, Arabic, Spanish, Hungarian, Russian, Bosnian, and Thai and several other languages. Several countries, such as the UK, have used the San Remo Manual as a model for creating their own ROE systems.

== Training ==
The International Institute of Humanitarian Law in San Remo, Italy conducts rules of engagement training course at least once per year, usually in September. Taught by some of the world's foremost authorities on ROE, the course attracts students from around the globe. Similar training by the San Remo ROE drafting team is conducted for the United Nations, staff colleges and other organizations as requested.

== See also ==
- Law of war
- IDF Code of Ethics
