= Neutral waters =

Neutral waters is a legal term from international laws of war, that refers to territorial waters of a state which maintains neutrality respective to the conflict in question. For example, San Remo Manual on International Law Applicable to Armed Conflicts at Sea defines the neutral waters as follows (article 14):

Neutral waters consist of the internal waters, territorial sea, and, where applicable, the archipelagic waters, of neutral States.

In colloquial use, however, this term is often used as synonymous to international waters.
