= Military exclusion zone =

Area in the immediate vicinity of a military action

A military exclusion zone (MEZ) is an area in the immediate vicinity of a military action established by a country to prevent the unauthorized entry of civilian personnel/equipment for their own safety or to protect natural assets already in place in the zone. It is also established to prevent an enemy from acquiring any material which could help them. The comparable term used by the air forces is that of no-fly zone.

== See also ==
- Border zone
- Maritime Exclusion Zone
- Restricted military area
- Total Exclusion Zone, an area declared by the United Kingdom 30 April 1982 covering a circle of 200 nautical miles around the Falklands Islands during the Falklands War.
