= International Institute of Humanitarian Law =

Institute promoting the study and dissemination of international humanitarian law

- Type: Non-profit humanitarian organisation
- Established: 1970
- President: Lt. Gen. (ret.) Giorgio Battisti
- Location: Sanremo, Italy
- Website: www.iihl.org/

The International Institute of Humanitarian Law (IIHL) is an independent, "non-profit, humanitarian association having social values as its objectives", founded in 1970 in Sanremo, Italy. The main purpose of the institute is to promote international humanitarian law and related subjects. Its headquarters are situated in Villa Ormond, while a liaison office of the institute is established in Geneva, Switzerland.

The institute works in collaboration with international organisations dedicated to the humanitarian cause, including the International Committee of the Red Cross (ICRC), the United Nations High Commissioner for Refugees (UNHCR), and the International Organization for Migration (IOM). It has operational relations with the European Union, UNESCO, NATO, the Organisation International de la Francophonie and the International Federation of Red Cross and Red Crescent Societies. Furthermore, it has consultative status with the United Nations Economic and Social Council (ECOSOC).

== Organisation and bodies ==
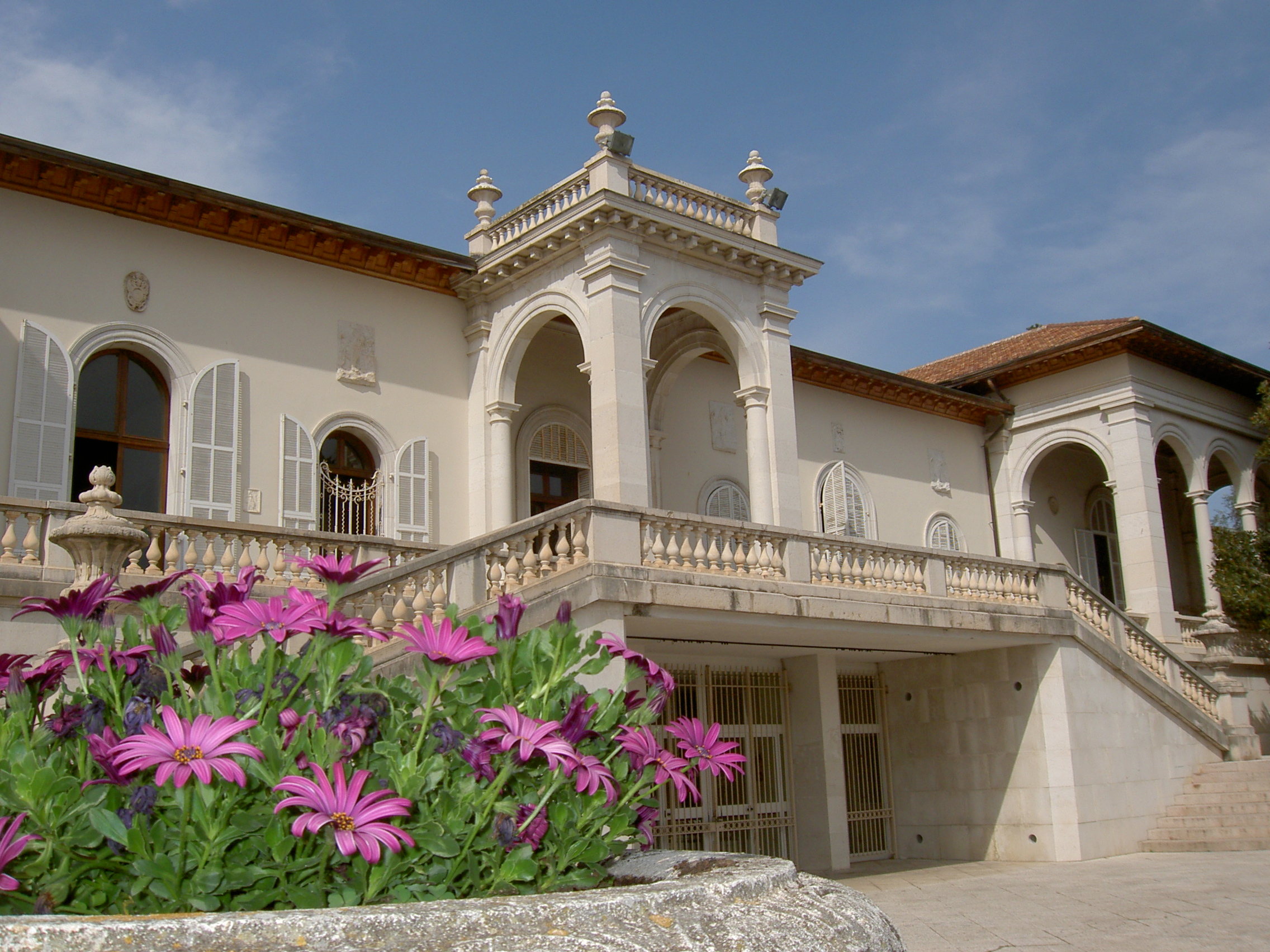
The Villa Ormond headquarters of the institute in Sanremo

The institute is composed of six statutory bodies namely the General Assembly, the president, the council, the executive board, the secretary-general and the treasurer.

The General Assembly, including all members of the institute, establishes the general policy of the institute. It meets in an ordinary session each year to approve the annual budget and final accounts.

The president is elected by the council every four years and may be re-elected for a second consecutive term up to a maximum of eight consecutive years. The president is the chief executive officer of the institute and has the primary responsibility to ensure that the institute pursues its purpose and objectives in conformity with the Statutes and the general policy established by the General Assembly. Since September 2023, president of the institute is Lieutenant General (ret.) Giorgio Battisti (Italy). Former president, Judge Fausto Pocar (Italy), is honorary president of the institute.

The council is composed of twelve members elected by the General Assembly for a period of four years, each of whom may be re-elected for a total period of twelve consecutive years. The council oversees the management of the institute, determining the programme of activities, elects the president and vice-presidents and appoints the secretary-general and treasurer, who then form the executive board. The Municipality of Sanremo and the Italian Red Cross are ex officio members of the council of the institute. Currently, personalities of the diplomatic world, judges, scholars and military officers are among the institute's Council members:

- Vidar BIRKELAND (Norway), Lawyer/Medical Doctor (MD); Special advisor, Statnett SF;
- Professor Michael BOTHE (Germany), Professor emeritus, J.W. Goethe University, Frankfurt/Main
- Professor Geoffrey S. CORN (United States), Chair of Criminal Law and Director of the Center for Military Law and Policy, Texas Tech University School of Law
- Brigadier General Dr. Karl EDLINGER (Austria), Legal Adviser, Austrian Armed Forces
- Professor Chris JENKS (United States), Senior IHL Advisor to the Judge Advocate General of the US Army
- Professor Nils MELZER (Switzerland), Director of International Law, Policy & Humanitarian Diplomacy, ICRC; Human Rights Chair, Geneva Academy of IHL and Human Rights
- Professor Marco PEDRAZZI (Italy), Full professor of International Law, University of Milan
- Brigadier General Jan Peter SPIJK (The Netherlands), former head of Military Legal Services NLD Armed Forces and honorary president, International Society for Military law and the Law of War
- Brigadier General Darren STEWART OBE (United Kingdom), General Editor, United Kingdom Joint Service Manual of the Law of Armed Conflict; Development, Concepts and Doctrine Centre, UK Ministry of Defence
- Professor Bakhtiyar TUZMUKHAMEDOV (Russia), Vice-president of the Russian Association of International Law
- Professor Gabriella VENTURINI (Italy), Professor emerita, University of Milan
- John YOUNG (United States), Head of Protection Learning and Development, UNHCR Global Learning and Development Centre, Budapest
- MUNICIPALITY OF SANREMO (ex officio member);
- ITALIAN RED CROSS (ex officio member).

Members of the institute are of different nationalities. They are persons that have particularly distinguished themselves through competence or activities in fields of specific interest to the Organisation. Institutions significantly contributing to the work of the institute may also be admitted as members. Qualified persons and academic institutions, as also nations and international intergovernmental organisations contributing to the activities of the institute, may be admitted as Associate members but may not vote.

== Training activities ==
The institute provides an annual programme of training activities in International Humanitarian Law (IHL), Refugee Law and associated subjects. These activities are designed for a diverse, international and multicultural audience with participation welcomed from military personnel, government officials, diplomats, experts, representatives of non-governmental organisations and students from around the world.

=== Military courses on law of armed conflict (LOAC), international humanitarian law (IHL) and related subjects ===
To foster the development of knowledge in International Humanitarian Law, the institute structures its training at three levels, which develop progressively and all emphasise the practical application of IHL:

- IHL Foundation Courses: provide personnel with a practical introduction to the Law of Armed Conflict delivered from an operational military perspective;
- Advanced Courses on IHL: an intensive course designed for experienced military/civilian legal advisers, military officers and those from Government or International Organisations with an in depth knowledge of IHL/LOAC;
- Specialised IHL Courses: aimed at personnel who require an enhanced practical understanding of a specific area of IHL. Among these specific training programmes: Courses for Directors of Training Programmes in IHL; the Peace Support Operations Course; the Detention and Captured Persons Course; the Targeting Course; the Rules of Engagement Course; the Naval Operations and the Law Course.
- IHL Workshops: designed to address the needs of the IHL practitioners who face the most difficult legal challenges in the field. These activities are usually of shorter duration with less formal training. The emphasis is on the exchange of views and experiences between participants and instructors in order to reach a deeper understanding of the subject and thus provide a cutting-edge perspective.

At all levels of training, the institute aims at complementing plenary presentations with interactive discussion, debate and exercises designed to strengthen each participant's knowledge and facilitate the sharing of different national approaches and best practice.

=== International Refugee law, Statelessness, Internal Displacement and Migration law courses ===
Courses in these areas aim at filling the gaps in knowledge and skills of government and civil society officials engaged in work with people in need of protection. Through its training, capacity-building, and horizontal sharing of experiences, the institute advocates for the safeguarding of rights in a way that complements and adds on the efforts of donors in the field of protection of refugees, IDPs, stateless persons and migrants. These training programmes strike a fine balance between theory and practice, allowing the audience to exchange experiences and ideas, and utilize the participants' existing skills to deal with complex legal issues in a pragmatic manner. These courses are delivered in close collaboration with UNHCR and other key partners such as the IOM, the Special Rapporteur on the Human Rights of Internally Displaced Persons and the International Federation of the Red Cross and Red Crescent Societies.

=== International Disaster Law course ===
The course is jointly organized by the International Institute of Humanitarian Law in collaboration with the International Federation of Red Cross and Red Crescent Societies, the International Disaster Law Project, the Italian Red Cross and the EU Jean Monnet Module on "International and European Disaster Law" Roma Tre University.

== The Sanremo Round Table ==
Ever since it was created, the institute has drawn particular attention to current trends and developments in humanitarian law and related subjects, by organizing an annual international gathering that takes place in Sanremo. This event has become known in the world as the "Sanremo Round Table".

== Research and publications ==
The institute has become increasingly involved in research activities, study and analysis. It publishes texts, essays and monographs that aim to contribute to the awareness of issues relevant to international humanitarian law and its different aspects, refugee law and migration law.

The "Sanremo Manual on International Law applicable to Armed Conflict at Sea", which was compiled between 1988 and 1994, still remains the most consulted manual at Naval Military Academies all over the world and an essential work of reference on a global scale. The San Remo Manual is currently being updated by international experts and practitioners.

The "Sanremo Handbook on the Rules of Engagement (RoE)", published in November 2009, represents the only work of this type which sets out to explain in a practical way the complex procedures and methodology governing the development and implementation of Rules of Engagement. It has been translated into the 6 official languages of the United Nations as well as Bosnian, Hungarian and Thai.

More recently the institute supported the drafting of the "UNESCO Manual on the Protection of Cultural Property". The Manual, compiled by a team of internationally renowned experts, serves as a practical guide to the implementation by military forces of the rules governing the protection of cultural property in the event of armed conflict. It combines a military-focused account of the international legal obligations of states and individuals with suggestions as to best practice at the different levels of command during the conducting of military operations by land, sea or air.

The "Manual on the Law of Non-International Armed Conflict" which was published in March 2006, reflects the developments registered by humanitarian rules at a time when conflicts too often differ from classical warfare between States bound by the Hague Conventions and the Geneva Protocols.

The "Handbook on Integrating Gender Perspectives into International Operations" – the Sanremo Handbook on Gender – was published on 2019 and represents the concrete contribution of the Sanremo Institute to the promotion of gender perspectives with regard to the protection of specific groups of vulnerable individuals in conflict areas. This Handbook, prepared by international civil and military experts convened in Sanremo by the institute, provides a practical framework for gender mainstreaming in the training of the military, police officers and civilians who are involved in conflict scenarios.

For over 20 years now, since 1998, the institute has then continued to produce a series of publications dedicated to the proceedings of the Round Table on current issues of international humanitarian law. The last Sanremo Round Table, held in Sanremo from 4 to 6 September 2019, addressed the issue of "Whither the human in armed conflict? IHL implications of new technology in warfare".

Finally, every three months the institute distributes and publishes on its official website a "Newsletter", which describes its important initiatives and activities.

== See also ==
- International humanitarian law
- Refugee law
- Internally displaced person
- Statelessness
- Geneva Conventions (1949)
- Sanremo Manual on International Law Applicable to Armed Conflicts at Sea
- See Legal assessments of the Gaza flotilla raid
