= Hercules (1970 ship) =

Liberian-owned crude carrier

History

Liberia
- Name: Hercules
- Owner: United Carriers Inc. of Liberia
- Builder: Hitachi Zosen Corporation
- Completed: February 1971
- Out of service: 20 July 1982
- Fate: Scuttled in Guanabara Bay, Brazil
- Charterer: Amerada

General characteristics
- Class & type: Very large crude carrier
- Tonnage: 220,000 DWT
- Length: 1,067 ft (325 m)
- Beam: 150 ft (46 m)
- Draft: 60 ft (18 m)

Hercules was a Japanese-built and Liberian-owned very large crude carrier launched in 1970 and completed the following year. She was chartered from 1977 by Amerada to carry North Slope Alaska crude oil from Alaska to the Hovensa oil refinery in the United States Virgin Islands. On 8 June 1982, she was traversing the South Atlantic, en route to collect a load of crude oil, when she was attacked three times by Argentine aircraft. She was severely damaged by air-to-surface missiles and struck by two bombs that failed to detonate. Listing, she put into port in Brazil so that the damage could be assessed; it was determined that it was too dangerous to move an unexploded bomb lodged in one of her oil tanks. Her owner, United Carriers, decided to scuttle the vessel off the Brazilian coast. Claims by United Carriers and Amerada failed to reach Argentine courts, and an attempt to claim jurisdiction for a case to proceed in US courts eventually failed after a Supreme Court decision.

== Construction ==
The Hercules was built in Japan by Hitachi Zosen Corporation at Sakai, launched on 17 November 1970, and completed in February 1971. She was a very large crude carrier measuring 220,000 deadweight tonnage. She measured 1,067 feet (325 m) in length and at 60 feet (18 m) in draft and 150 feet (46 m) in width, exceeding the Panamax restrictions of the period, thereby requiring navigation of Cape Horn to cross between the Pacific and Atlantic oceans.

She was owned by United Carriers Inc. of Liberia. From 1977 she was chartered by Amerada and used to carry Alaskan oil from Valdez, the terminus of the Alaska Pipeline to Amerada's Hovensa oil refinery at Saint Croix, United States Virgin Islands, which was then the largest crude oil refinery in the world.

== Sinking ==
Location of the Hercules shortly after the attack.

Hercules left Hovensa on 25 May 1982 empty, except for ballast and a full load of bunker fuel. At this time the South Atlantic was the site of the Falklands War, following the 2 April invasion of the British dependent territory of the Falkland Islands by Argentina. The British government had declared a 200 nautical miles (370 km; 230 mi) Total Exclusion Zone around the islands in which they stated any ship or aircraft of any nation was liable to be fired upon; the Argentine government had declared a similar zone as extending 200 nautical miles (370 km; 230 mi) from their coast. On 11 May, the Argentinians widened the area under threat, declaring that "any vessel flying the United Kingdom flag which is navigating in the [South Atlantic] towards the area of operations and/or which may be presumed to constitute a threat to national security shall be considered hostile, and action will be taken accordingly." The Hercules did not plan to navigate through the exclusion zones, but she was sailing south through the South Atlantic towards Cape Horn, so there was the potential for misidentification. The United States Maritime Administration advised both governments by telex of the movements of all US-flagged vessels and also Liberian-flagged tankers with US interests (which included the Hercules) due to pass through the South Atlantic in an attempt to secure their safety.

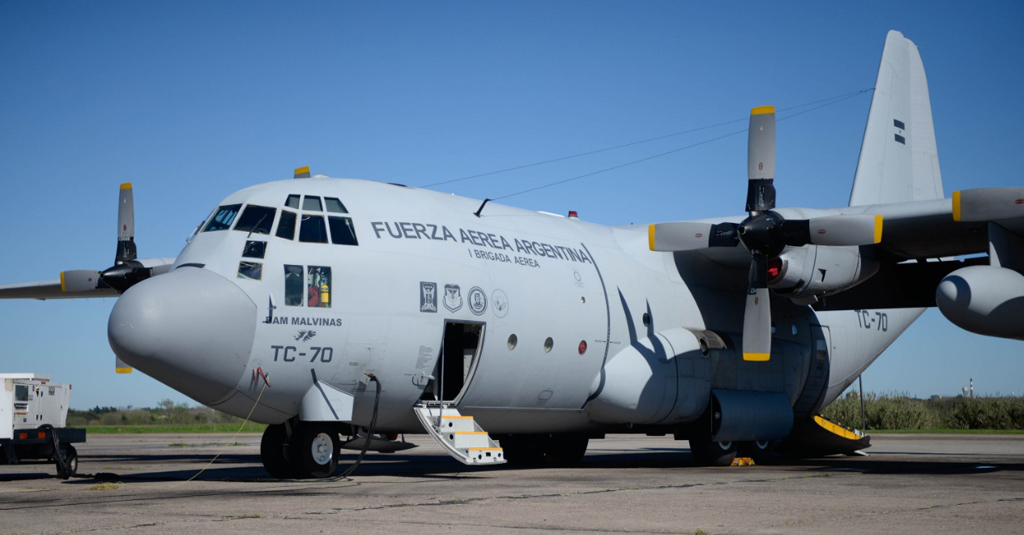
A C-130 aircraft in service with the Argentine Air Force since 1979

On 8 June 1982, Hercules was at a position some 480 nautical miles (890 km; 550 mi) north-east of the Falklands and 600 nautical miles (1,100 km; 690 mi) off the Argentine coast, in international waters, when she was attacked three times by Argentine military aircraft. At the time the Jornal do Brasil reported from an Argentine military source that the Hercules was hit by Argentine C-130 aircraft hunting the British liner Queen Elizabeth 2. Hercules was struck by a number of air-to-surface missiles and two 500-lb bombs. Both bombs failed to detonate; one struck the foredeck and rolled into the sea and the other penetrated the deck and lodged in an oil tank, below the waterline. The deck and hull suffered extensive damage from the bomb strikes and missiles, and the Hercules began taking on water, developing a 6-degree list. The ship's 30-man Italian crew were unharmed.

A few hours after the attack, the Hercules was located at 45 degrees south and 42 degrees, 25 minutes west. The Royal Navy dispatched the hospital ship HMS Hydra to the scene to render assistance. The Hercules turned eastwards at full speed to move away from the conflict area and afterwards headed to port in Brazil. In port, the Brazilian Navy assessed the bomb and, following discussions, United Carriers determined it was too hazardous to attempt to remove. On 20 July 1982, she was towed from Guanabara Bay by the tug Smit Lloyd 3 and scuttled by opening her seacocks at a position 250 nautical miles (460 km; 290 mi) off the coast.

== Court cases ==
United Carriers claimed a loss of $10 million as the value of the Hercules and Amerada a loss of $1,901,259.07 for the value of the fuel. The claimants failed to reach a hearing in Argentine courts and raised a case in the United States District Court for the Southern District of New York. In 1986 the court ruled the case as out of jurisdiction. This was reversed in the United States Court of Appeals for the Second Circuit in 1987 on the basis that it came within the scope of the Foreign Sovereign Immunities Act, as it resulted from a violation of international law by "attacking a neutral ship in international waters, without proper cause for suspicion or investigation", had a direct impact on the United States, as it was to carry oil for use in that country, and its loss disrupted contractual payments due to be made in New York. The case reached the Supreme Court of the United States in 1988 which reversed the decision of the Court of Appeal and found that there was no jurisdiction to hear the case.
