= Maritime Exclusion Zone =

Military exclusion zone at sea

A Maritime Exclusion Zone (MEZ) is a military exclusion zone at sea. While it is an accepted concept internationally, it is not the subject of an explicit treaty, and there has been variation in naming including: "naval exclusion zone", "maritime security zone", "blockade zone", "maritime operational zone", "area subject to long distance blockade" and "area dangerous to shipping".

During armed conflicts since the Russo-Japanese War in 1904, belligerents have sometimes established maritime zones to control or prohibit access of foreign ships and aircraft, with varying levels of restriction and risk of attack on merchant vessels. A MEZ is different to a blockade in that enforcing naval forces are not deployed close in to a port but over an extended area, and that offending vessels are generally subject to attack rather than confiscation. The development of the MEZ concept from a blockade reflects the technological changes enabling longer ranges for detection systems and weapons.

== Modern concept ==
A more modern and consistent approach has been adopted since the San Remo Manual on International Law Applicable to Armed Conflicts at Sea was published in 1994, which defined blockade zones in articles 105 to 108. MEZs warn vessels and aircraft to avoid the area, to reduce the risk that neutral or non-combatant vessels will be mistakenly targeted. However merchant ships, neutral or enemy, do not automatically become a lawful target by being in a MEZ; they must be evaluated as legitimate military objectives before being targeted.

Many military Law of Sea manuals, including those of the Australian, Canadian, German and United Kingdom navies, set out regulations for the operation of MEZs, based on the internationally legally recognized San Remo Manual. The Australian manual notes that "there is no specific international law treaty provision referring to [Maritime Exclusion Zones], however, their use has acquired a degree of validity under customary international law".

Neutral vessels must be given safe passage through a MEZ if it significantly impedes safe access to neutral ports, although they may be searched in transit by a belligerent. Sometimes a "blue safe maritime corridor" through a MEZ is defined and published to regulate such safe access.

MEZs have been routinely employed, for example by the United Kingdom and Argentina during the Falklands War, by Iran and Iraq during the Tanker War, by the United States during the Gulf War and Iraq War, and by Russia in the Russian invasion of Ukraine.

MEZs are not required in the immediate area of naval operations for a belligerent to control an area "within which hostilities are taking place or belligerent forces are actually operating", where the activities and communications of neutral vessels and aircraft may be prohibited.

== See also ==
- Blockade of the Gaza Strip
- International Maritime Organization
- No-fly zone
- Right of visit
- United Nations Convention on the Law of the Sea
- Total Exclusion Zone – stricter variant used in the Falklands War
