= Right of visit =

Concept in international maritime law

In international maritime law, right of visit (also right of visitation, right of search) allows a belligerent warship during wartime to stop and board a neutral merchant ship in order to verify that the ship nationality matches the declared one and its operation does not break a naval blockade, does not involve contraband, and does not provide non-neutral services to the enemy. The use of word "visit" probably refers to a misunderstanding of the French word visite, which in this context means search.

The visit is customarily made by a warship's boat that brings onboard of the merchant vessel an officer in charge and his assistant, armed with no more than sidearms. Alternatively, the commander of the warship might summon the merchant shipmaster aboard the warship with certain requested paperwork.

During wartime, the right can be exercised by any commissioned ship or aircraft of a belligerent in both high seas and in the territorial waters of the belligerent or its enemies. During peacetime or to non-belligerents, a right of visit does not apply, with the exceptions laid out in the Article 110 of the United Nations Convention on the Law of the Sea (UNCLOS): suspicion of piracy, slavery, unlawful broadcasting, or in case of suspicion that the nationality of the merchant ship is actually the same as the one of warship or the merchant ship has no nationality.

== Agreements ==
States are, naturally, free to enter bilateral or multilateral agreements that provide prior consent to a visit of a merchant ship of a signatory state by a warship of another signatory. This cooperation might be essential for preventing unlawful fishing, migrant smuggling, and the trafficking of narcotics. For example, the 1995 Council of Europe Agreement on Illicit Traffic by Sea permits boarding the ships of other signatories with prior authorization. These agreements are not necessarily reciprocal, for example, the 1981 agreement between the United States and the United Kingdom allows US warship to board British-flagged ships in certain regions of high seas (Caribbean, the American Gulf, and areas of Atlantic Ocean) with no reciprocity provided to the United Kingdom. United States, with its outsized bargaining power was able to secure very beneficial terms in agreements with Belize, Liberia, Panama, Cyprus and the Marshall Islands: US can board ships flying the flags of these countries upon requesting a permission and not receiving a rejection within a two-hour window. The obviously inadequate time allocated to signatories makes the notification in this case at best a "window-dressing" for the state sovereignty.

The 1988 Vienna Convention against Illicit Traffic in Narcotic Drugs and Psychotropic Substances, while building upon UNCLOS, did not include a right to visit foreign vessels suspected of running the narcotic trade, but established a procedure of requesting an ad-hoc permission from another state.

The Convention for the Suppression of Unlawful Acts against the Safety of Maritime Navigation of 1988 and subsequent Protocols introduced additional exceptions. This Convention was developed in order to resolve jurisdictional issues that surfaced after the murder of an American citizen onboard Achille Lauro, an Italian vessel, in Egyptian territorial waters.

The Proliferation Security Initiative was established by the United States in 2003 and includes more than 100 countries that agreed on a (non-binding) Statement of Interdiction Principle with the purpose of counterproliferation. It is unclear how its principles can apply beyond the territorial waters of signatories or interfere with right of the innocent passage. As some commenters noted, the transit of the proliferation material does not necessarily can be considered "prejudicial to the peace, good order or security of the coastal state" when the intended use of the weapons occurs at a faraway destination, not during the transit.

== Background ==
The principle of freedom of the high seas essentially prohibits "interference in peacetime by ships flying one national flag with ships flying the flag of other nationalities". The right of visit is the most significant exception to this basic principle.

The four-hundred-year-old concept of mare liberum necessitates limiting jurisdiction of a particular state on the high seas to the ships under its own flag: "no nation can exercise a right of visitation and search upon the common and unappropriated parts of the sea, save only on the belligerent claim" (Le Louis case, 1817). "Any freedom that is to be exercised in the interests of all entitled to enjoy it, must be regulated" (International Law Commission, 1958), so to safeguard the freedom of the seas for every state, certain restrictions on its exercise are inevitable.

=== Declaration of London ===
The regulation of naval search during time of war was codified as part of the Declaration of London (1903). However, no state ratified the declaration so it had no force in international law.

The intent of the declaration was as follows. The right of search belongs to belligerents alone. Its object is to verify the nationality of the vessel and if neutral to ascertain whether it carries contraband. The consequence of resistance to search is capture and trial in a Prize court. Article 63 of the Declaration states that "Forcible resistance to the legitimate exercise of the right of stoppage, search and capture involves in all cases the condemnation of the vessel. The cargo is liable to the same treatment as the cargo of an enemy vessel. Goods belonging to the master or owner of the vessel are treated as enemy goods." At the Hague Convention of 1907, the question of the liability to search of mail-ships gave rise to much discussion based on incidents arising out of the Boer and Russo-Japanese Wars. It was ultimately decided under a separate article of the Hague conference that postal correspondence of neutrals and even of belligerents, and whether official or private, found on board a neutral or even an enemy ship should be "inviolable", and that though the ship should be detained, this correspondence had to be forwarded to its destination by the captor "with the least possible delay". The only exception to this exemption is correspondence destined for or proceeding from a blockaded port. As regards the mail-ships themselves, apart from this inviolability of the correspondence, no exemption or privilege is extended beyond the injunction that they should not be searched, except when absolutely necessary, and then only "with as much consideration and expedition as possible", which might just as well be said of all ships stopped or searched in international waters.

=== U.S. Navy ===
According to the U.S. Navy's Commander’s Handbook on the Law of Naval Operations,

Under the law of armed conflict, belligerent warships or aircraft may visit and search a merchant vessel for the purpose of determining its true character, i.e., enemy or neutral, nature of cargo, manner of employment, and other facts bearing on its relation to the conflict. Such visits occur outside neutral territorial seas. This right does not extend to visiting or searching warships or vessels engaged in government non-commercial service. In addition, neutral merchant vessels in convoy of neutral warships are exempt from visit and search, although the convoy commander may be required to certify the neutral character of merchant vessels' cargo.

== See also ==
- Law of Armed Conflict
- Blockade
- Maritime Exclusion Zone

== Sources ==
- Barclay, Thomas (1911). "Search" . In Chisholm, Hugh (ed.). Encyclopædia Britannica. Vol. 24 (11th ed.). Cambridge University Press. p. 560.
- International Law Studies (2024). "Annotated Supplement to the Commander's Handbook on the Law of Naval Operations. Chapter 3". International Law Studies. 102 (1). Stockton Center for International Law.
- Kerchove, René de baron (1983) [1961]. "Right of visit, right of visitation". International Maritime Dictionary: An Encyclopedic Dictionary of Useful Maritime Terms and Phrases, Together with Equivalents in French and German (2 ed.). Van Nostrand Reinhold. p. 598. ISBN 978-0-442-02062-0. OCLC 1039382382.
- Kerchove, René de baron (1983) [1961]. "Visit". International Maritime Dictionary: An Encyclopedic Dictionary of Useful Maritime Terms and Phrases, Together with Equivalents in French and German (2 ed.). Van Nostrand Reinhold. p. 598. ISBN 978-0-442-02062-0. OCLC 1039382382.
- Klein, Natalie (2007). "The Right of Visit and the 2005 Protocol on the Suppression of Unlawful Acts against the Safety of Maritime Navigation". Denver Journal of International Law and Policy. 35 (2): 287–332.
- Papastavridis, Efthymios (2011). "The Right of Visit on the High Seas in a Theoretical Perspective: Mare Liberum versus Mare Clausum Revisited". Leiden Journal of International Law. 24 (1): 45–69. doi:10.1017/S0922156510000580. ISSN 0922-1565.
- "United Nations Convention on the Law of the Sea" (PDF).
