= Total Exclusion Zone =

Surrounding the Falkland Islands during the 1982 conflict

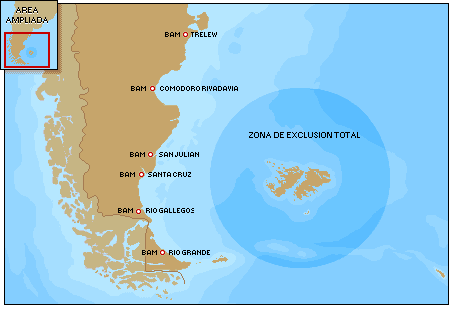
The Total Exclusion Zone as of 30 April 1982.

The Total Exclusion Zone (TEZ) was an area declared by the United Kingdom on 30 April 1982 covering a circle of radius 200 nautical miles (370 km; 230 mi) from the centre of the Falkland Islands. During the Falklands War any sea vessel or aircraft from any country entering the zone was liable to be fired upon without further warning.

== Description ==
A Maritime Exclusion Zone (MEZ) was declared on 12 April 1982 covered a circle of radius 200 nautical miles (370 km; 230 mi) from the centre of the Falkland Islands. Any Argentine warship or naval auxiliary entering the MEZ could have been attacked by British nuclear-powered submarines (SSN).

On 23 April, in a message that was passed via the Swiss Embassy in Buenos Aires to the Argentine government, the British Government clarified that any Argentine ship or aircraft that was considered to pose a threat to British forces anywhere in the South Atlantic would be attacked:

In announcing the establishment of a Maritime Exclusion Zone around the Falkland Islands, Her Majesty's Government made it clear that this measure was without prejudice to the right of the United Kingdom to take whatever additional measures may be needed in the exercise of its right of self-defence under Article 51 of the United Nations Charter. In this connection Her Majesty's Government now wishes to make clear that any approach on the part of Argentine warships, including submarines, naval auxiliaries or military aircraft, which could amount to a threat to interfere with the mission of British Forces in the South Atlantic will encounter the appropriate response. All Argentine aircraft, including civil aircraft engaged in surveillance of these British forces, will be regarded as hostile and are liable to be dealt with accordingly.

The term "civilian aircraft" alludes particularly, but not only, to the Boeing 707 of the Argentine Air Force that until then had shadowed the British Task Force on its journey south and had been escorted away on several occasions by Sea Harriers.

The Total Exclusion Zone (TEZ) was an area declared by the United Kingdom on 30 April 1982. It covered the same area as the MEZ. During the Falklands War any sea vessel or aircraft from any country entering the zone may have been fired upon without further warning. This has been described as a "legally questionable exclusion zone", going beyond the well understood in international law Maritime Exclusion Zone, which protects neutral and civilian vessels. However, it is also noted that the zone was sited away from major shipping lanes and no foreign-flagged vessels were actually attacked. Thus the zone was argued to have been intended to aid identification of legitimate military targets, rather than to announce the targeting of everything in the area.

When ARA General Belgrano was sunk on 2 May 1982, it was outside the TEZ. This has led to much debate and controversy over whether the attack was legal. However, exclusion zones are historically declared for the benefit of neutral vessels; during war, under international law, the heading and location of a belligerent naval vessel has no bearing on its status. In addition, the captain of the Belgrano, Héctor Bonzo, has testified that the attack was legitimate (as did the Argentine government in 1994).

Interviews conducted by Martin Middlebrook for his book, The Fight for the "Malvinas", indicated that Argentine Naval officers understood the intent of the message was to indicate that any ships operating near the exclusion zone could be attacked. Argentine Rear-Admiral Allara who was in charge of the task force of which the Belgrano was a part said, "After that message of 23 April, the entire South Atlantic was an operational theatre for both sides. We, as professionals, said it was just too bad that we lost the Belgrano". On 7 May 1982, the TEZ was supplemented by a declaration that any Argentinian warships and military aircraft found more than 12 nautical miles from the coast of Argentina would be liable to be attacked.

For its part, Argentina also declared a 200 mile exclusion zone around the islands, additionally declaring on May 11 that all British flagged vessels in the south Atlantic sailing towards the area would be presumed hostile and liable to attack. The neutral Liberian tanker Hercules was attacked by accident due to this order.
