= Legal assessments of the 2010 Gaza flotilla raid =

Evaluation of action by Israeli navy

Multiple legal assessments of the Gaza flotilla raid were published subsequent to the event. International law experts (and non-lawyers) differed over the legality of the action by Israel. The force necessary to respond to violent resistance and whether the force that was used was proportionate were disputed.

Approximately one year after the event, the UN investigative committee for the 2010 Flotilla to Gaza concluded that (1) the blockade was legal, based on the principle of self-defense, (2) Israel was "justified in stopping vessels even outside its territorial waters," (3) Israel's decision to board the vessels with such force was "excessive," (4) Israeli forces "faced significant, organized and violent resistance from a group of passengers" that required them to use force for their own protection, and (5) the loss of nine lives was "unacceptable." It recommended that Israel immediately report its use of force to the United Nations Security Council for resolution as specified in Chapter VII of the United Nations Charter.

Some, such as law experts Harvard Law School Professor Alan Dershowitz, Chicago Law School Professor Eric Posner, and Johns Hopkins International Law and Diplomacy Professor Ruth Wedgwood, said that the naval blockade, the boarding in international waters, and the use of force were in accord with long-standing international law. Dershowitz compared the blockade with the U.S. blockade of Cuba during the Cuban Missile Crisis and Posner with the Coalition blockade of Iraq during the first Gulf War.

The United Nations High Commissioner for Human Rights, the International Committee of the Red Cross, the National Lawyers Guild's International Committee, Istanbul Bilgi University's Law Department Dean Turgut Tarhanlı and other experts have concluded that the blockade was itself illegal, or agreed with University of Dundee international law professor Robin Churchill that the boarding on the high seas was illegal even if the blockade were lawful, or agreed with international law professor Said Mahmoudi that the use of force was disproportionate and the raid was therefore illegal even if the blockade and the boarding in international waters were lawful. An investigation by a panel of legal experts convened by the UN determined that the use of force by the Israeli military was disproportionate, that the Israeli military violated international law, and found clear evidence sufficient for war crimes prosecutions under the Fourth Geneva Convention - which defines humanitarian protections for civilians in a war zone and prohibits total war.

The issue of possible violation of international law was discussed at the UN Security Council. The United States blocked a draft resolution criticizing Israel proposed by Turkey, the Palestinians, and Arab nations.

== Legality of blockade ==
=== Arguments opposing legality of blockade ===
The United Nations Charter requires that nations avoid the use of force when settling external conflicts, and that human rights be respected with regards to internal conflicts. Nations which use force in self-defense are required to immediately report these measures to the United Nations Security Council so that it can fulfill its role of ensuring peace.

The United Nations High Commissioner for Human Rights, Navanethem Pillay, has condemned Israel's blockade of Gaza on multiple occasions, calling it "a direct contravention of international human rights and humanitarian law. It must end now”.

The "United Nations Fact Finding Mission on the Gaza Conflict" in its Goldstone Report said:

1733. The Mission ... considers that the series of acts that deprive Palestinians in the Gaza Strip of their means of subsistence, employment, housing and water, that deny their freedom of movement and their right to leave and enter their own country, that limit their rights to access a court of law and an effective remedy, could lead a competent court to find that the crime of persecution, a crime against humanity, has been committed.

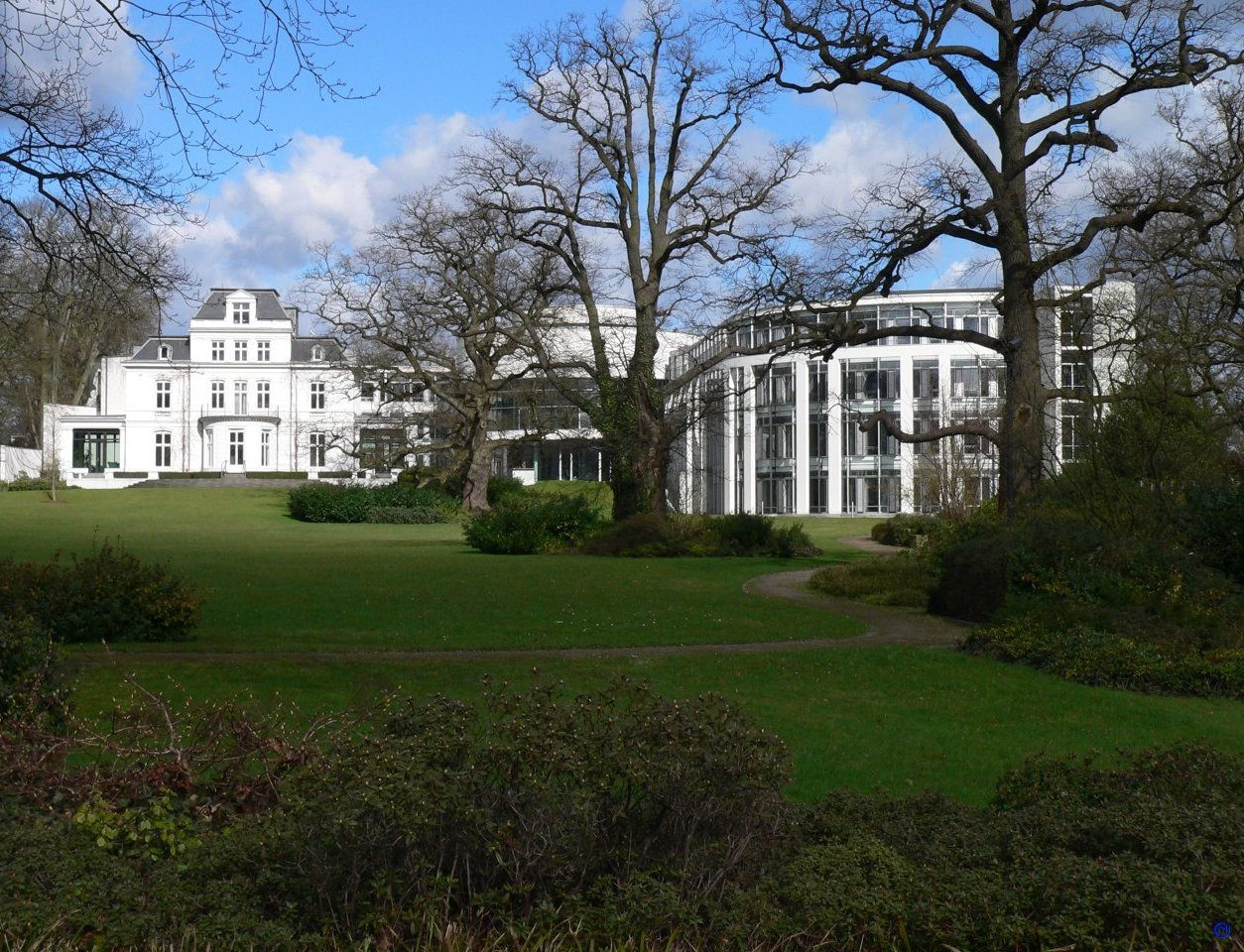
The International Tribunal for the Law of the Sea, in Hamburg, Germany, was established by the United Nations Convention on the Law of the Sea

The International Committee of the Red Cross said that Israel's blockade violated the Geneva Conventions and stated that it constituted a collective punishment imposed in clear violation of Israel's obligations under international humanitarian law.

Dr. Turgut Tarhanlı, dean of the Istanbul Bilgi University's Law Department, cited the concept of innocent passage, under which vessels are granted safe passage through territorial waters in a manner which is not "prejudicial to the peace, good order or the security" of the state. He said that:

the Convention on the Law of the Sea stipulates that a coastal state may consider intervention if a ship is engaged in arms and drug smuggling, the slave trade or terrorist activities. However, the case with the aid boats is totally different. They set sail in accordance with the Customs Act and are known to be carrying humanitarian aid, not weapons or ammunition. According to the Convention on the Law of the Sea, Israel was not entitled to launch a military operation against the boats and activists.

With regard to the Gaza–Jericho Agreement, Diana Buttu, a Palestinian-Canadian lawyer and former spokesperson for the Palestine Liberation Organization, said that Israel declared the Oslo Accords dead in 2001, and actually breached the agreements, so that a call to the applicability of the Gaza-Jericho Agreement is not plausible.

Douglas Guilfoyle, a lecturer at University College of London since 2007 who authored Shipping Interdiction and the Law of the Sea in 2009, told Aljazeera that, while a blockade is a recognized tool of warfare, a close look should be taken as to whether there was proper notification of the Gaza blockade, and whether it inflicted "excessive damage to the civilian population in relation to the concrete military advantage expected".

Amnesty International, in a report dated June 1, 2010, included the opinion that "As a form of collective punishment, Israel's continuing blockade of Gaza is a flagrant violation of international law."

The European Parliament, in a June 14, 2010 resolution, called the Gaza blockade "collective punishment in contravention of international humanitarian law" and demanded its immediate cessation.

=== Arguments supporting legality of blockade ===
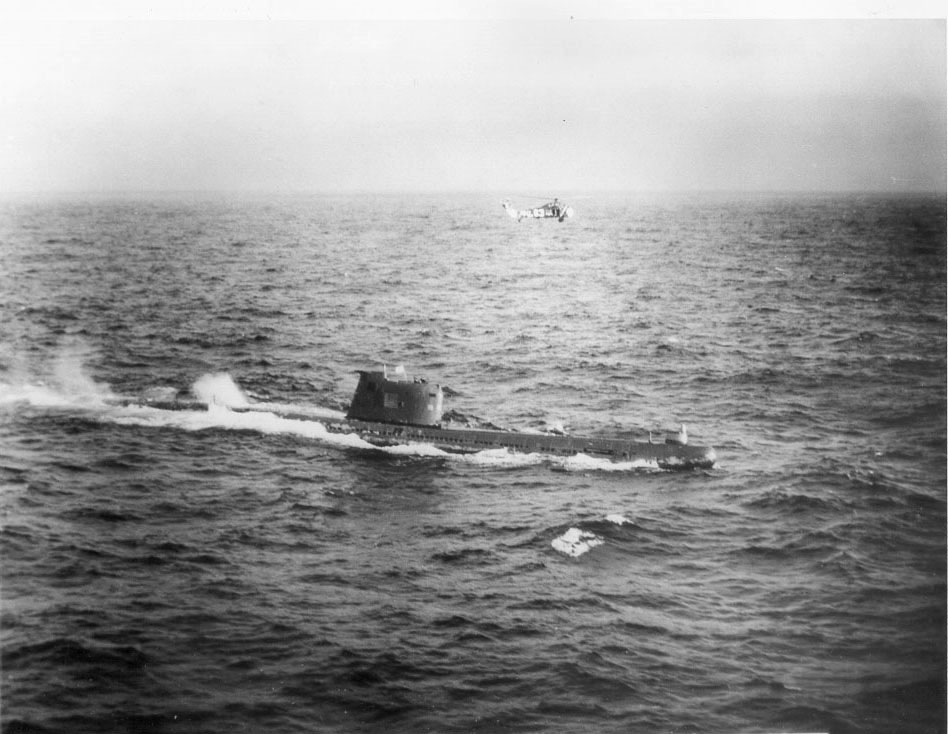
Soviet submarine forced to surface by U.S. Navy, in Caribbean near Cuba, during Cuban Missile Crisis blockade

Alan Dershowitz, professor of Law at Harvard Law School, wrote that the legality of blockades as a response to acts of war “is not subject to serious doubt.” He likened Israel's maritime blockade of Gaza to U.S. naval actions in Cuba during the Cuban Missile Crisis, which the U.S. had deemed lawful though not part of an armed conflict.

Similarly, Allen Weiner, former U.S. State Department attorney and legal counselor at the American Embassy in The Hague, and now a Stanford Law School professor, said "the Israeli blockade itself against Gaza itself is not illegal".

Ruth Wedgwood, a professor of International Law and Diplomacy at the School of Advanced International Studies at Johns Hopkins University, said that under the law of armed conflict, which would be in effect given Hamas's rocket attacks on Israel and Israel's responses, Israel has "a right to prevent even neutrals from shipping arms to [Hamas]".

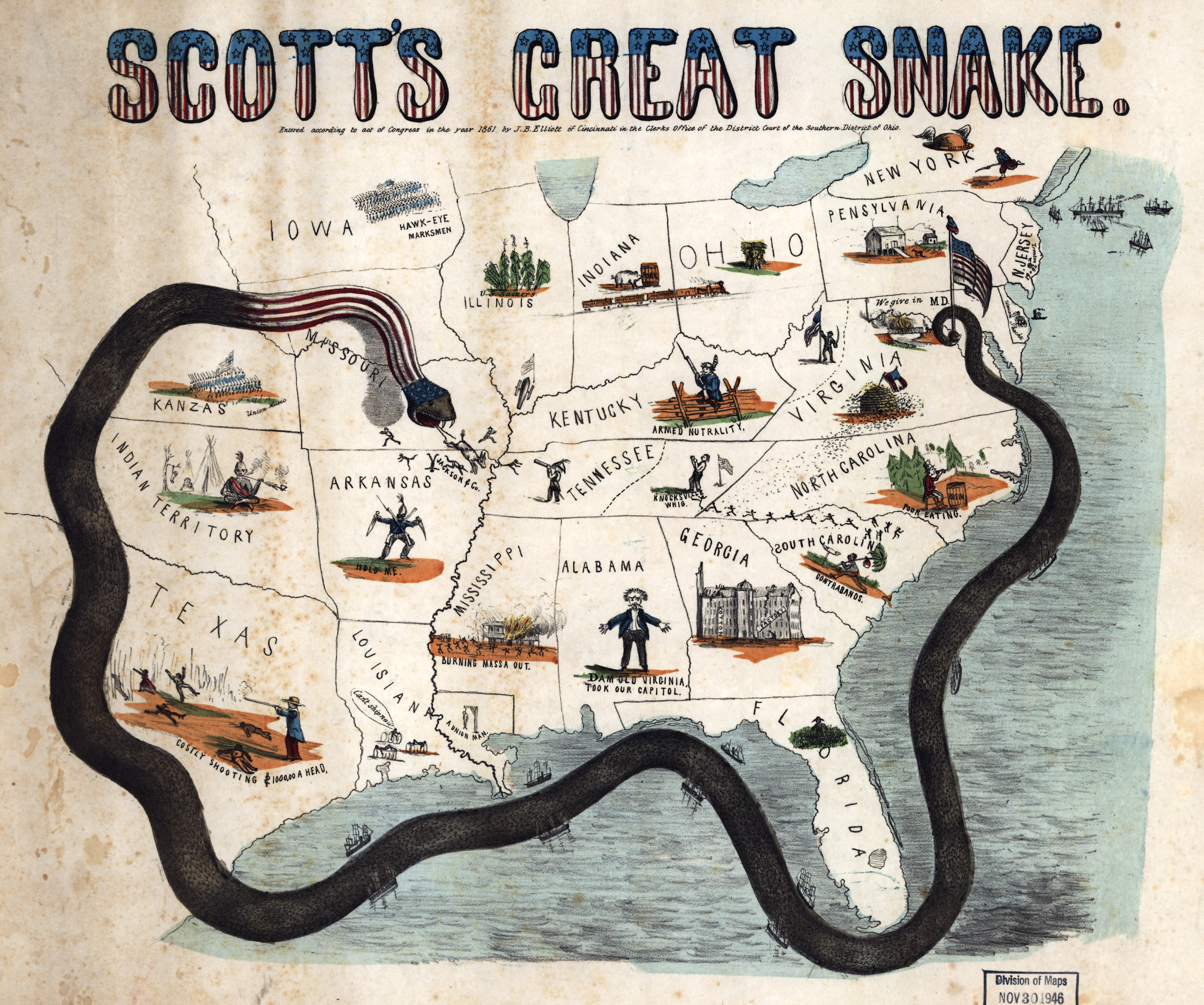
Cartoon map of Union blockade of Confederacy during U.S. Civil War

Eric Posner, international law professor at the University of Chicago Law School, noting that the raid had "led to wild accusations of illegality", wrote that blockades are lawful during times of armed conflict (such as the Coalition blockade of Iraq during the first Gulf War), and that "war-like conditions certainly exist between Israel and Hamas". He compared Israel's blockade to the Union blockade by the Union against the Confederacy (a non-state) during the U.S. Civil War. The U.S. Supreme Court later affirmed the legitimacy of that blockade.

Philip Roche, a partner in the shipping disputes and risk management team with the London-headquartered international law firm Norton Rose, also said: "On the basis that Hamas is the ruling entity of Gaza, and Israel is in the midst of an armed struggle against that ruling entity, the blockade is legal." The basis for that is the law of blockade, derived from international law that was codified in the 1909 London Declaration concerning the Laws of Naval War, and which was then updated in 1994 in the San Remo Manual on International Law Applicable to Armed Conflicts at Sea--"a legally recognized document". He addressed the charge by Human Rights Watch that the blockade of a terrorist organization constitutes a collective penalty against civilians, ostensibly violating Article 33 of the fourth Geneva Convention, by saying "This argument won't stand up. Blockades and other forms of economic sanctions are permitted in international law, which necessarily means that civilians will suffer through no fault of their own."

International law Professor Ed Morgan of the University of Toronto, likewise, noting that it is clear that Israel and Hamas are in a state of armed conflict, which has been noted by the General Assembly to the Human Rights Council in its Goldstone Report, wrote that a blockade of an enemy's coast is an established military tactic. He pointed out that it is recognized as a means at the Security Council’s disposal under Article 42 of the UN Charter, and is similarly set forth in Article 539 of the Canadian Forces manual Counter-Insurgency Operations.

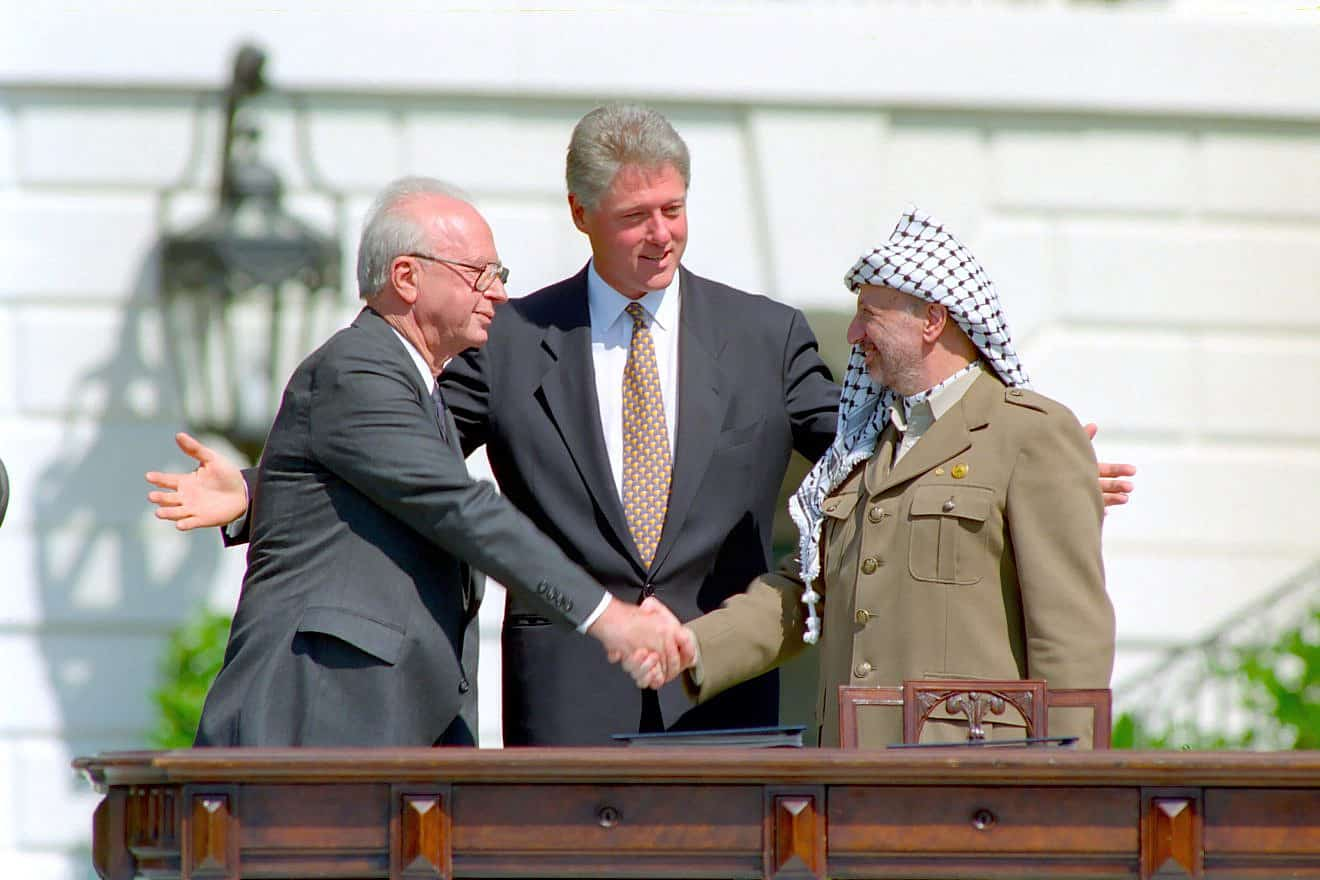
Yitzhak Rabin, Bill Clinton, and Yasser Arafat at the Oslo Accords signing ceremony in 1993

He wrote:

Having announced its blockade, Israel had no obligation to take the ships’ crew at their word as to the nature of the cargo. The blockading party has the right to fashion the arrangements, including search at a nearby port, under which passage of humanitarian goods is permitted.

U.S. Vice President Joe Biden said "Israel has a right to know – they're at war with Hamas – has a right to know whether or not arms are being smuggled in. It's legitimate for Israel to say, 'I don't know what's on that ship. These guys are dropping ... 3,000 rockets on my people.'"

Abbas Al Lawati, a Dubai-based Gulf News journalist on board the flotilla, opined that Israel is likely to cite the Gaza–Jericho Agreement (Annex I, Article XI) which vests Israel with the responsibility for security along the coastline and the Sea of Gaza. The agreement stipulates that Israel may take any measures necessary against vessels suspected of being used for terrorist activities or for smuggling arms, ammunition, drugs, goods, or for any other illegal activity.

Professor Wedgwood opined that the goal of the flotilla was to: "denude Israel of what it thinks it was guaranteed in the 1993 Oslo Accords which preceded the Gaza-Jericho Agreement, which is the control of the external borders of Gaza and West Bank.... The problem ... is that you could easily have a rearming of Hamas, which caused a terrible conflict."

== Legality of enforcing blockade on the high seas ==
=== Arguments opposing legality of high seas enforcement ===
Robin Churchill, international law professor at the University of Dundee in Scotland, said there was no legal basis for boarding the ships as they were in international waters. A group of Israeli lawyers petitioned the Supreme Court of Israel charging that Israel had violated the United Nations Convention on the Law of the Sea by capturing the boats in international waters, but a Supreme Court ruling signed by Justice Dorit Beinish rejected those suits outright.

Member countries of the International Maritime Organization.

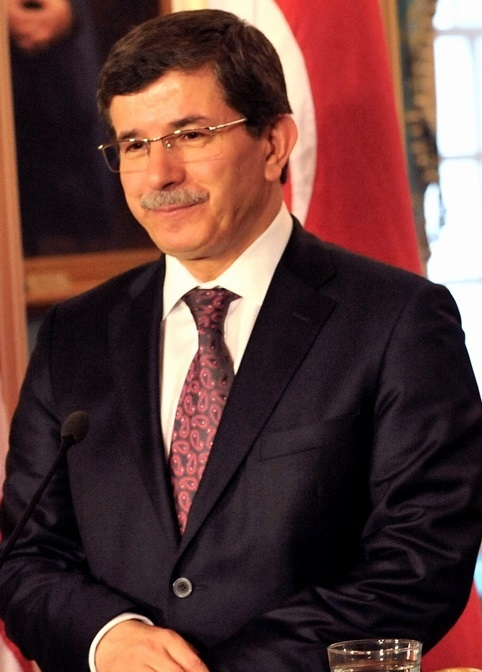
Turkish foreign minister Ahmet Davutoğlu

José María Ruiz Soroa, a Spanish maritime law scholar and co-author of the legal commentary Manual de derecho de la navegación marítima, said that Israel is not entitled according to international law to constrain the freedom of navigation of any ship on the high seas, except in a number of situations that do not apply to the Gaza flotilla case. He said blockade is not a valid reason, as it is a concept only applicable to war situations. He also said that Israel's action is a breach of the UN International Maritime Organization Convention for the Suppression of Unlawful Acts Against the Safety of Maritime Navigation (SUA), which entered into force for Israel in April 2009. He said that according to the article 6.1 of the SUA, the jurisdiction over the offences that a ship might have committed lies in the state whose flag the ship is flying. SUA Article 9 states "Nothing in this Convention shall affect in any way the rules of international law pertaining to the competence of States to exercise investigative or enforcement jurisdiction on board ships not flying their flag."

According to George Bisharat, a professor at Hastings College of the Law, Israel's blockade of Gaza was illegal, and enforcing the blockade in international waters was similarly illegal. Bisharat wrote that "flotilla passengers were entitled to defend themselves against Israel's forcible boarding of the Mavi Marmara, whether or not Israeli commandos fired immediately on landing on the ship's deck".

Turkey's foreign minister Ahmet Davutoğlu said:

High-seas freedom, freedom of navigation, was one of the oldest forms of international law; no vessel could be stopped or boarded without the consent of the captain or flag State. Any suspected violation of the law did not absolve the intervening State under international law. To treat humanitarian delivery as a hostile act and to treat aid workers as combatants could not be deemed legal or legitimate.

Canadian scholar Michael Byers said that the event would only be legal if the Israeli boarding were necessary and proportionate for the country's self-defence. Byers believed that "the action does not appear to have been necessary in that the threat was not imminent."

In a legal analysis published by the Frankfurter Allgemeine Zeitung, a staff expert on international law said that countries are not allowed to extend their sovereignty on areas outside their coastal waters. In international waters, if there is reasonable suspicion of piracy or human trafficking, a country has the right to access foreign ships. If the suspicion remains, it can search the ship.

International waters

Richard Falk, former professor of international law at Princeton University and U.N. human rights investigator in the Palestinian territories said that the “ships that were situated in the high seas where freedom of navigation exists, according to the law of the seas” and called for those responsible to "be held criminally accountable for their wrongful acts".

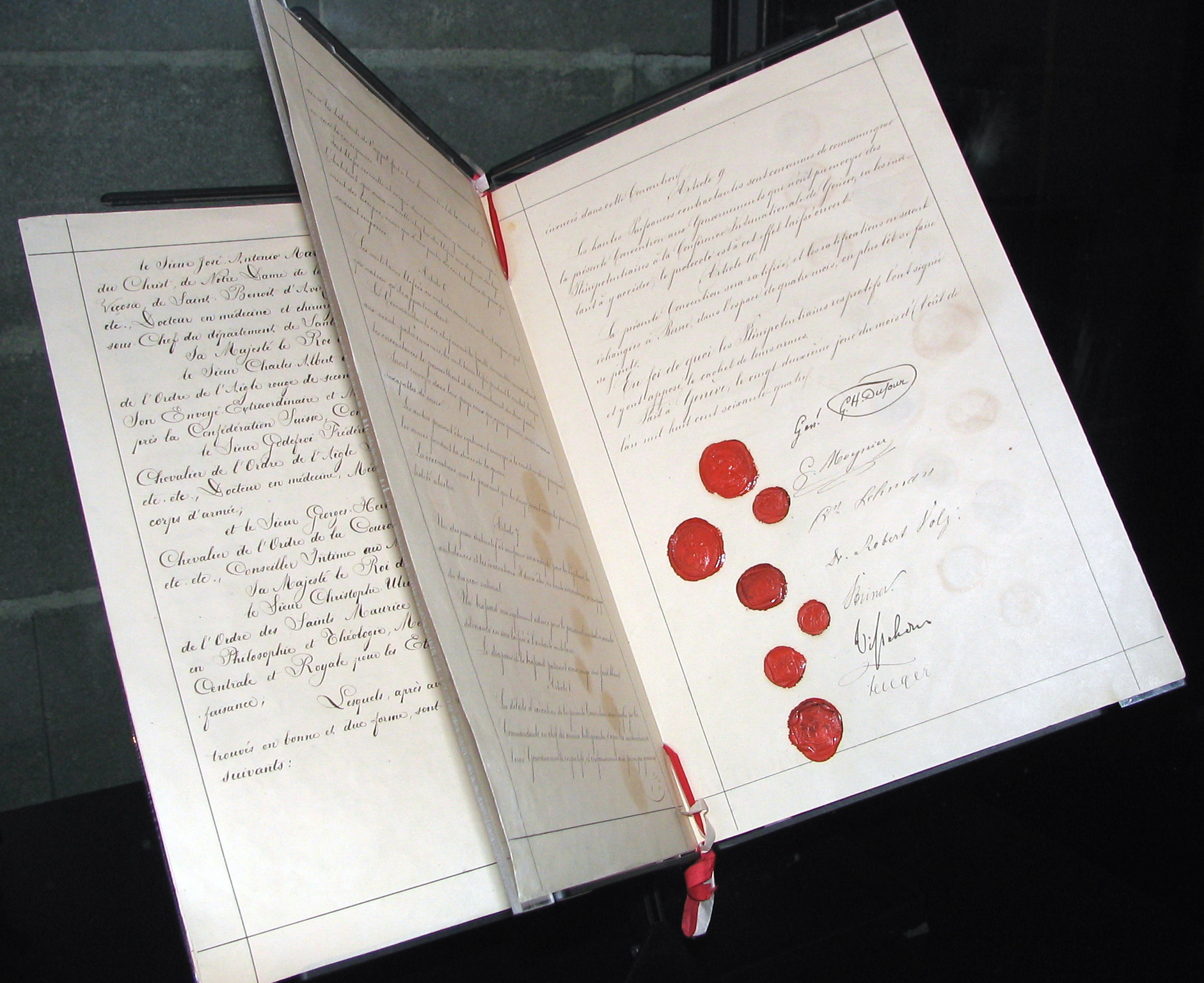
The 1864 First Geneva Convention

Jason Alderwick, a maritime analyst at the International Institute for Strategic Studies of London, said that the Israeli raid did not appear to have been conducted lawfully under the convention. Anthony D'Amato, international law professor at Northwestern University School of Law, argued that the San Remo Manual on International Law Applicable to Armed Conflicts at Sea applies to a situation in which the laws of war between states are in force. He said the laws of war do not apply in the conflict between Israel and Hamas, which isn't even a state. He said the law of the Geneva Conventions would apply.

Linda Brayer, an Israeli human rights lawyer who specialized in the laws of war and international law, concludes that:

It follows, therefore, that Israel was first of all not allowed to attack these vessels militarily, and then not to board these vessels by force, capture these vessels, attack the passengers, imprison them on the vessels, forcibly remove them from the vessels, and steal their private property in the form of cameras, computers, clothes, etc.

=== Arguments supporting legality of high seas enforcement ===
The Israeli Foreign Ministry argued that the flotilla's interception was lawful, as Israel had publicly declared its blockade, and had given the ships prior notification, and that activists had made it clear by written and oral statements that they intended to violate the blockade. It further argued that international law allowed a state to enforce a naval blockade in international waters, so long as the blockade did not impede access to the ports or coasts of neutral states.

Several legal experts say, under the law of a blockade, intercepting a vessel could apply globally so long as a ship is bound for a "belligerent" territory.

Alan Dershowitz said that action taken in international waters is permissible if a legal blockade is in effect, and if there is no doubt that the offending ships have made a firm determination to break the blockade. "It's okay for Israeli ships to operate in international waters to enforce [the blockade]," said Allen Weiner. Guilfoyle told Aljazeera that if the blockade was legal, "then yes, a ship could have been intercepted on the high seas, if there was a suspicion it was attempting to breach the blockade."

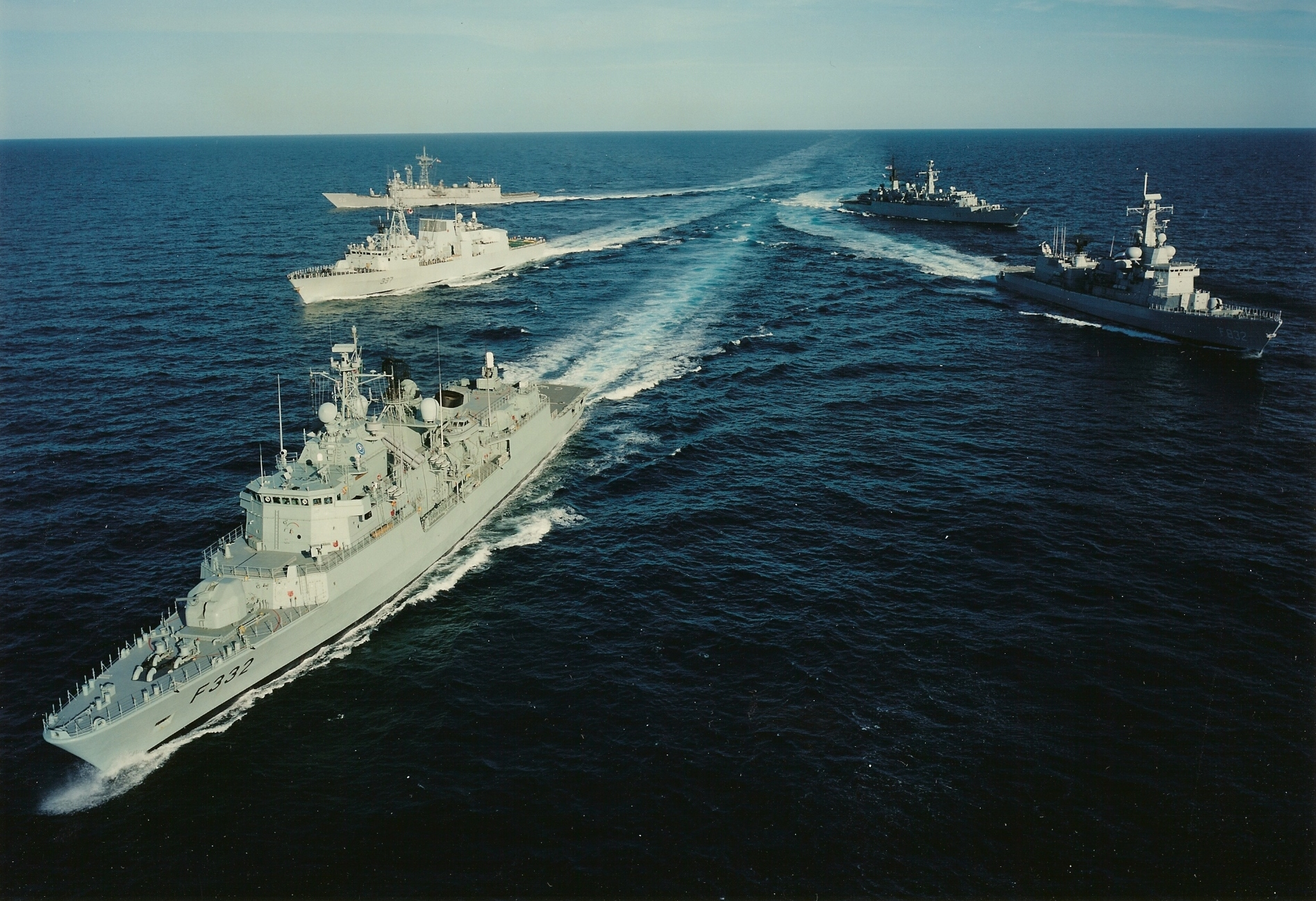
NATO and U.S. ships enforcing the Operation Sharp Guard blockade

Ruth Wedgwood, similarly, said that "the right of visit and search under the law of the sea, or under the law of armed conflict, can be conducted on the high seas". She pointed out that the U.S. itself, as a neutral throughout most of the 1800s, submitted its ships to inspections on the high seas to allow belligerents to make sure that its cargoes weren't actually fueling any of the European wars. She also noted that the U.S. itself blockaded Cuba during the Cuban Missile Crisis, and also commented that in the wars in Yugoslavia, the U.N. itself, and NATO, through Operation Sharp Guard, imposed a blockade on shipments to Yugoslavia. Roche also indicated that under the law of a blockade, a ship can be intercepted on the high seas as long as it is bound for the blockaded territory. Professor Posner, as well, wrote that "longstanding customary international law permits states to enforce publicly announced blockades on the high seas". Professor Morgan also said that under the San Remo law, a blockade is often enforced in what would otherwise be international waters.

Mark Regev, spokesman for the Prime Minister of Israel, referring to the San Remo Manual on International Law Applicable to Armed Conflicts at Sea, said:

The San Remo memorandum states, specifically 67A, that if you have a boat that is charging a blockaded area you are allowed to intercept even prior to it reaching the blockaded area if you've warned them in advance, and that we did a number of times, and they had a stated goal which they openly expressed, of breaking the blockade. That blockade is in place to protect our people.

== Use of force ==
=== Positions that use of force was illegal ===
A United Nations Human Rights Council fact-finding mission was charged by the UN to undertake an investigation of the IDF raid. In its September 2010 report the UN panel found that the IDF broke international law, and that there was evidence sufficient to initiate prosecutions for breaches of the Geneva Convention. In particular, the panel, after interviewing more than 100 witnesses, found clear evidence for prosecution for the war crimes of "wilful killing; torture or inhuman treatment; wilfully causing great suffering or serious injury to body or health" under Article 147 of the Fourth Geneva Convention. The report stated that:

"The conduct of the Israeli military and other personnel towards the flotilla passengers was not only disproportionate to the occasion but demonstrated levels of totally unnecessary and incredible violence.”

The UNHRC fact-finding mission also determined based on both "forensic and firearm evidence" that Furkan Dogan, a 19-year-old American citizen of Turkish descent, and five Turkish citizens were killed execution-style on May 31 on the MV Mavi Marmara by the Israeli commandos. The report of the fact-finding mission stated that the killing of Dogan and the five Turks by the Israeli commandos "can be characterized as extra-legal, arbitrary and summary executions."

A legal analysis published by the Frankfurter Allgemeine Zeitung said that Israeli soldiers had the right to defend themselves, but if Israel used force against the ships without legal justification, the crew members had the right to defend themselves. (Note: Müller, Reinhard (June 2, 2010). "Auf Hoher See darf kein Zwang ausgeübt werden". Frankfurter Allgemeine Zeitung. "Den Staaten ist es völkerrechtlich nicht erlaubt, die Hohe See ihrer Souveränität zu unterstellen.... In der sogenannten Anschlusszone, deren Grenze 24 Seemeilen von der eigenen Küste verläuft, haben die Staaten noch Kontrollrechte – vor allem, um ihren Einreise- und Gesundheitsvorschriften Geltung zu verschaffen.... Es gibt auch ein Recht, fremde Schiffe zu betreten. Das setzt aber etwa voraus, dass ein begründeter Verdacht der Seeräuberei oder des Sklavenhandels besteht – oder dass vermutet werden muss, dass das fremde Schiff keine Staatszugehörigkeit besitzt. ... Nicht in Zweifel steht, dass sich israelische Soldaten gegen Angriffe zur Wehr setzen dürfen. Hat Israel allerdings ohne rechtlichen Grund Gewalt gegen die Schiffe eingesetzt, so durften sich deren Besatzungsmitglieder zur Wehr setzen." Translation: "Countries are not allowed by international laws to extend their sovereignty on international waters. ... In an area that is called the contiguous zone, which extends 24 nautical miles (44 km) from the coast of the country, states have the right to inspection – especially to ensure the application of immigration and public health laws and regulations.... There also exists a right to access foreign ships. This, however, presupposes that there is a well-founded suspicion of piracy or human trafficking – or that it must be suspected that the foreign ship is not registered in any country.... There is no doubt that Israeli soldiers have the right to defend themselves against attacks. If Israel has used force against the ships without legal justification, however, the members of the crew had the right to defend themselves.") Said Mahmoudi, an international law professor, said that boarding a ship on international waters, killing and capturing civilians is not in line with the law.

Minister Davutoğlu called the raid "a grave breach of international law and constituted banditry and piracy - it was "murder" conducted by a State, without justification." Prominent Turkish jurists characterized Israel's actions as a violation of international law and a "war crime." Turkey's deputy parliament speaker, Guldal Mumcu, said in a declaration that "[t]his attack was an open violation of United Nations rules and international law."

=== Positions that use of force was lawful ===
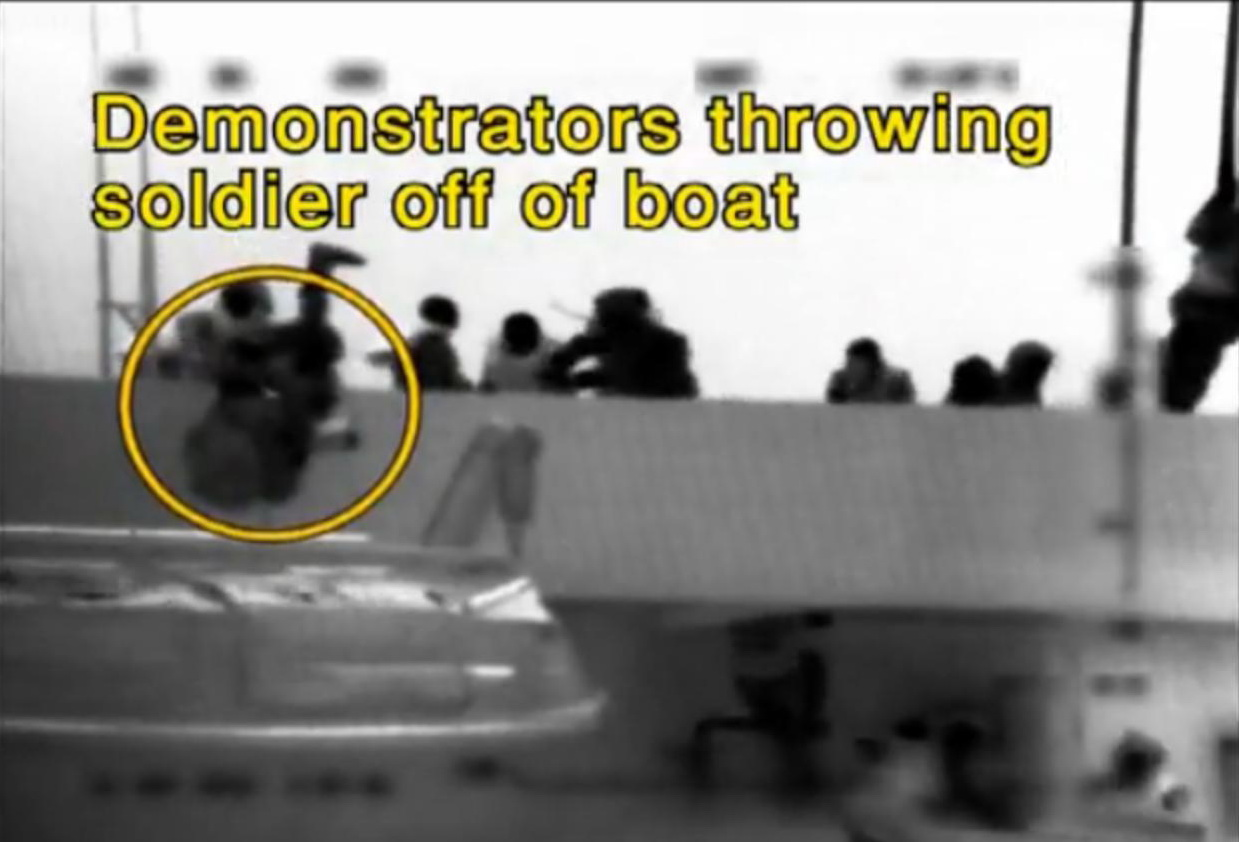
Flotilla passengers throwing an Israeli soldier off the ship's deck

As to the use of force when boarding a ship in such circumstances, it is legal but must be proportionate, according to Commander James Kraska, professor of international law at the U.S. Naval War College, and Professor Morgan. Proportionate force does not mean that guns cannot be used by forces when being attacked with knives, but "there has got to be a relationship between the threat and response," said Kraska. According to J. Peter Pham, a strategic adviser to U.S. and European governments, "from what is known now, it appears that Israel acted within its legal rights."

Professor Posner noted that the "1990 UN Basic Principles on the Use of Force & Firearms by Law Enforcement Officials" is not international law, but rather akin to vague "best practices" for advising countries with poorly trained police forces, and does not apply to a military operation. He wrote further:

Military operations must respect the principle of proportionality, which is a fuzzy, "know-it-when-you-see-it" test. But one thing is clear. Ships that run blockades may be attacked and sunk under international law. If Israel had exercised that right, far more than nine people would have been killed.

Israeli authorities said marines who boarded the vessel opened fire in self-defense after activists clubbed and stabbed them and snatched some of their weapons.

== Seizure of vessels and crew ==
=== Positions that the seizure of vessels and crew was illegal ===
The Paris Declaration Respecting Maritime Law, cited in a United Nations report on the raid which concluded that the blockade had been a legitimate and legally implemented response to an act of aggression, states that "The neutral flag covers enemy's goods, with the exception of contraband of war". As ships of the Gaza Freedom Flotilla were using neutral flags, the internationally accepted restrictions on a blockade did not allow for the seizure of the humanitarian aid on the ships, the ships themselves, or their crew, regardless of the legality of the blockade itself. These rules were conceived in an age where inspection for contraband necessarily had to take place at sea, and do not stipulate that ships must alter their course to visit a port of a blockading nation.

While the Gaza–Jericho Agreement grants the Israel Navy the authority to take action against "vessels suspected of being used for terrorist activities or for smuggling arms, ammunition, drugs, goods, or for any other illegal activity", there is no evidence the Gaza Freedom Flotilla was violating any laws. An agreement between Palestine and Israel does not affect the rights of neutral vessels on the high seas under international law.

As Israel is not a party to the Vienna Convention on the Law of Treaties, there are no international agreements restricting the ability for Palestine to unilaterally exit from the Gaza-Jericho Agreement. While Palestine has acceded to the convention, it does not govern treaties that came into force prior to accession or ratification of the convention itself. Treaties that were entered into due to the threat or use of force, or by rogue government elements, are not bound by the terms of the convention. The Israeli occupation of Palestinian territories at the time the Gaza-Jericho Agreement was made, as a result of previous wars, along with the restrictions on civilians in those territories, suggests that both parties did not have equal status during its negotiation. The support of the governing authority in the Gaza Strip for the captured crew of the Gaza Freedom Flotilla shows that it does not view the restrictions on fishing and commerce to be to its benefit.

== Piracy ==
Under international law, the Israeli raid was considered state action and not piracy. Commander James Kraska said, "Whether what Israel did is right or wrong, it is not an act of piracy. Piracy deals with private conduct particularly with a pecuniary or financial interest."

Professor Morgan says that to describe Israeli actions in this case as "piracy" is "inapt since, under both customary law and Article 101 of the UN Convention on the Law of the Sea, that applies only to acts done for private gain." Nevertheless, some have used the word to denounce the incident.

== Israeli Supreme Court decisions ==
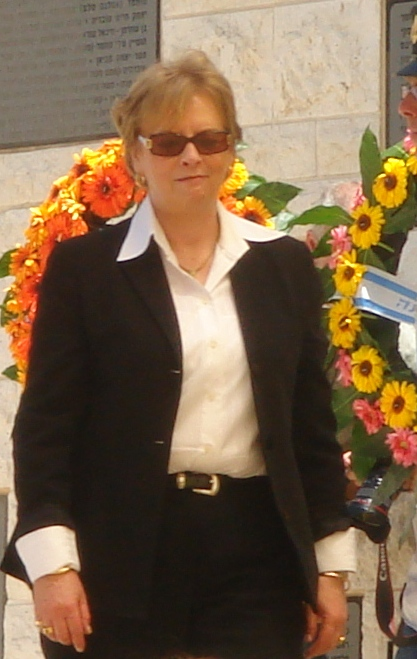
Israel Supreme Court President Dorit Beinisch

The Israeli Supreme Court rejected six petitions, from both leftist groups and rightist groups, against the IDF and Israel in regard to the raid "in the absence of just cause to intervene in the decision of the attorney general." Supreme Court President Dorit Beinish wrote in the Court's decision that:

The soldiers were forced to respond in order to defend their lives. Unfortunately, the action ended, as was not to be expected, with the loss of lives. Nine people were killed, and soldiers and flotilla participants were wounded.... the soldiers encountered a harsh and violent response.... The soldiers were attacked with knives, clubs, and metal rods. Attempts were made to snatch their personal weapons and to violently injure them. One of the soldiers was even dropped over the side of the ship.

The Court defended the decision to prevent the ships from reaching Gaza:

In light of Hamas' control of the Gaza Strip, Israel has take various steps meant to prevent direct access to the Gaza Strip, including the imposition of a naval blockade on the Strip, which, according to the State's declaration, is meant to block the infiltration of weapons and ammunition into Hamas ranks which have carried out shooting and terrorist attacks in Israeli territory for years with the goal of harming civilians.... Among other things, the State offered the flotilla's organizers to unload the cargo carried on the ship and to transfer the shipment ... via Israel. This offer was rejected.

The Court rejected petitions by right wingers (the Shurat HaDin Israel Law Center and the Almagor Terrorist Victims Association) to prevent the release and deportation of activists who attacked the IDF soldiers pending an investigation. The Court supported the attorney general's decision to release the activists, noting that:

After considering the fact that nine of the flotilla's participants were killed and dozens were injured, he reached the conclusion that the public, political, and security interests in this case trump law enforcement. We did not find any ground for intervening in this decision or in the considerations at its foundation.

The Court also rejected three petitions demanding information on the whereabouts of some of the passengers brought to Ashdod. In one leftist suit, the petitioners initially ascribed "illegal actions" to the State of Israel, calling its actions "massacre, murder, and ... piracy." But the petitioners revoked their petition after receiving the State Prosecutor's response and the Court's comments. The Court observed: "It is clear that the suit was filed in haste. Even though the petitioners knew nothing of what had occurred, they did not hesitate to hurriedly place the gravest possible stain on the IDF forces' actions".

A petition submitted to the Israeli Supreme Court by the al-Jazeera television network, on behalf of journalists working for the network who had been arrested on the ship, requesting their release, was deemed moot as the journalists had already been released.

== International Criminal Court ==
Lawyers representing the Turkish victims and the Turkish NGO IHH wrote to Luis Moreno Ocampo, prosecutor at the International Criminal Court (ICC) asking that the Israelis involved be criminally prosecuted before the ICC.

The ICC has jurisdiction over the incident in international waters because the Mavi Marmara was sailing under flag of the Comoros and the Comoros is a state party to the ICC.

On 5 July 2013, the Presidency of the International Criminal Court (ICC) assigned “the Situation on Registered Vessels of the Union of the Comoros, the Hellenic Republic and the Kingdom of Cambodia” to Pre-Trial Chamber I.

On 6 November 2014, the Office of the Prosecutor announced that it was concluding the preliminary examination of the situation referred by the Union of Comoros because legal requirements of the Rome Statute had not been met.

On 29 January 2015, the Representatives of the Government of the Union of the Comoros filed an Application for Review of the Prosecutor's Decision of 6 November 2014 not to initiate an investigation in the Situation.

On 24 April 2015, Pre-Trial Chamber I issued a decision on Victims’ Participation. It appointed the Principal Counsel of the Office of Public Counsel for Victims as the Legal Representative for unrepresented victims and invited victims who had communicated with the Court to submit any observations deemed relevant to the Chamber's review of the Prosecutor's Decision.

On 22 June 2015, the Legal Representative submitted observations on behalf of 109 victims.

On 16 July 2015, Pre-Trial Chamber I of the International Criminal Court (ICC), composed of Judges Joyce Aluoch, Cuno Tarfusser and Péter Kovàcs, by majority, Judge Péter Kovács dissenting, granted the request of the Union of Comoros to review the decision of the ICC Prosecutor not to investigate the attack against a Humanitarian Aid Flotilla by the Israeli Armed Forces on 31 May 2010 and requested the Prosecutor to reconsider such decision.

On 27 July 2015, the Office of the Prosecutor appealed the decision of Pre-Trial Chamber I to the Appeals Chamber.

On 6 November 2015, the Appeals Chamber decided by a majority that the appeal of the Prosecutor is inadmissible in limine.
