= San Remo Manual =

Document by the International Institute of Humanitarian Law

The San Remo Manual on International Law Applicable to Armed Conflicts at Sea was adopted in June 1994 by the International Institute of Humanitarian Law after a series of round table discussions held between 1988 and 1994 by diplomats and naval and legal experts. Those discussions followed from an initial review of then-existing law, the Round Table on International Humanitarian Law Applicable to Armed Conflicts at Sea, held in 1987 at San Remo, Italy. The manual is "the only comprehensive international instrument that has been drafted on the law of naval warfare since 1913."

== Overview ==
The manual is a legally recognized document but is not binding on states. The Manual is a codification of customary international law, an integration of existing legal standards for naval conflict with the Geneva Conventions of 1949 and Protocol I of 1977. The Manual is broken into six parts that each discuss a different section of the law, these being:

- General provisions, which deals with the scope of the law, various international naval events and the law, and definitions.
- Regions of operations, which discusses the legal aspects of conflict in internal waters, territorial seas, archipelagic and international straits, exclusive economic zones, the continental shelf, and the high seas.
- Basic Rules and target discrimination, which places limits on who and what can be targeted, warnings, exemptions offered to civilians and neutral states, and so on.
- Methods and means of warfare at sea, which details the conditional use of missile, torpedoes, mines, blockades, blockade zones and ruses of war.
- Measures short of attack: interception, visit, search, diversion and capture, which discusses the requirements to board and seize enemy and neutral ships, as well as cargo (also sometimes known as prize law).
- Protected persons, medical transports, and medical aircraft, which discusses protections offered for craft and people of this nature.

== Application ==
=== 2010 Gaza flotilla raid ===
The San Remo Manual was cited by the Israeli government to justify its boarding and seizure of ships trying to break the Gaza blockade (see Legal assessments of the Gaza flotilla raid), as well as by the United Nations Human Rights Council's international fact-finding mission to support their finding that the seizure was illegal. However, the use of the Manual as a justification by Israel is far from universally accepted, especially that it must not stop the delivery of human aid to civilians. In 2011 the UN-Secretary-General's Panel of Inquiry came to the conclusion that the Gaza blockade had been "imposed as a legitimate security measure", and that the flotilla should not have acted in a way that escalated the potential for conflict.

Paragraph 67 of the Manual states that belligerents may attack merchant vessels flying the flag of neutral states outside of neutral waters if they "are believed on reasonable grounds to be carrying contraband or breaching a blockade, and if after prior warning they intentionally and clearly refuse to stop, or intentionally and clearly resist visit, search or capture". Paragraph 146 states that it is permitted to capture neutral merchant vessels outside neutral waters if they are engaged in any of the activities referred to in paragraph 67. Further, while article 102 of the San Remo Manual states that a blockade is prohibited if it has the sole purpose of starving the civilian population or denying it other objects essential for its survival, the Inquiry panel found that there was a legitimate military objective (to prevent the influx of weapons).

However, the report also noted that Israel's use of force against the passengers was excessive, and recommended that Israel immediately report its use of force to the United Nations Security Council so it could find a permanent solution, as is required of Israel by the United Nations Charter.
