= Party-list proportional representation =

Family of voting systems

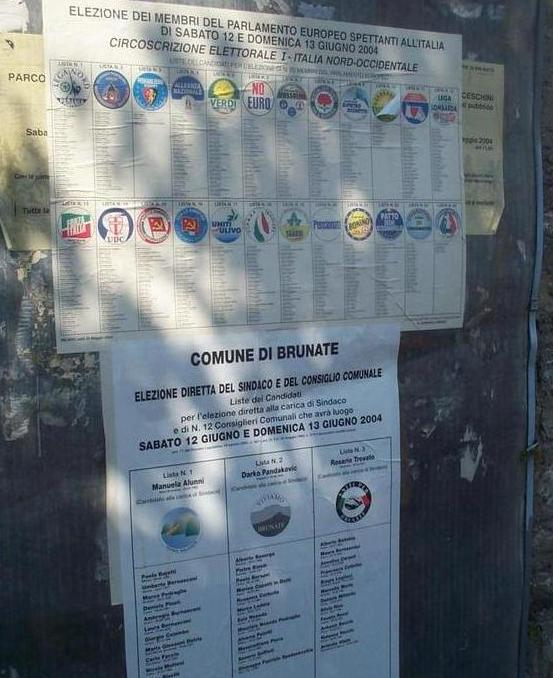
Poster for the European Parliament election 2004 in Italy, showing party lists

Party-list proportional representation (list-PR) is a system of proportional representation based on preregistered political parties, with each party being allocated a certain number of seats roughly proportional to their share of the vote.

In these systems, parties provide lists of candidates to be elected, or candidates may declare their affiliation with a political party (in some open-list systems). Seats are distributed by election authorities to each party, in proportion to the number of votes the party receives. Voters may cast votes for parties, as in Spain, Turkey, and Israel (closed lists); or for candidates whose vote totals are pooled together to determine the share of representation of their respective parties, as in Finland, Brazil, and the Netherlands (mixed single vote or panachage).

== Voting ==
In most party list systems, a voter will only support one party (a choose-one ballot). Open list systems may allow voters to support more than one candidate within a party list. Some open-list systems allow voters to support different candidates across multiple lists, which is called free list or panachage.

== Selection of party candidates ==
The order in which a party's list candidates get elected may be pre-determined by some method internal to the party or the candidates (a closed list system) or it may be determined by the voters at large (an open list system) or by districts (a local list system).

=== Closed list ===
In a closed list system, each political party has pre-decided who will receive the seats allocated to that party in the elections, so that the candidates positioned highest on this list will always get a seat in the parliament while the candidates positioned very low on the closed list will not. Voters vote only for the party, not for individual candidates.

=== Open list ===
An open list describes any variant of a party-list where voters have at least some influence on the order in which a party's candidates are elected. Open lists can be anywhere from relatively closed, where a candidate can move up a predetermined list only with a certain number of votes, to completely open, where the order of the list completely depends on the number of votes each individual candidate gets.

== Apportionment of party seats ==
Within party-list PR systems, there are a variety of different methods that can be used to determine how many seats are allocated to each party for a given vote breakdown. There are various apportionment methods used to allocate seats within party-list proportional representation; they can be classified into two categories:

- The highest averages method (or divisor method), including the D'Hondt method (also known as the Jefferson method) is used in Armenia, Austria, Brazil, Bulgaria, Cambodia, Croatia, Estonia, Finland, Poland, and Spain; and the Sainte-Laguë method (also known as the Webster method or the Schepers method) is used in Indonesia, New Zealand, Norway, and Sweden.
- The largest remainder (LR) methods, including the Hare-Niemeyer (Hamilton) method and the Droop method.

While the allocation formula is important, equally important is the district magnitude (number of seats in a constituency). The higher the district magnitude, the more proportional an electoral system becomes, with the most proportional results being when there is no division into constituencies at all and the entire country is treated as a single constituency. In some countries the electoral system works on two levels: at-large for parties, and in constituencies for candidates, with local party-lists seen as fractions of general, national lists. In this case, magnitude of local constituencies is irrelevant, seat apportionment being calculated at national level.

List proportional representation may also be combined with other apportionment methods in various mixed systems, using either additional member systems or parallel voting.

Some apportionment methods may favor small parties; others may favor large parties:

- D'Hondt method (biased towards large parties)
- Sainte-Laguë method (generally considered closest to proportional but does not ensure that a party receiving more than half the votes will win at least half the seats)
- Huntington–Hill method (biased towards small parties, automatically gives every party at least one seat)
- Adams' method (heavily biased towards small parties, automatically gives every party at least one seat)
- Hare-Niemeyer method (roughly unbiased, some bias towards smaller parties)
- Droop method (slightly biased towards large parties)

=== D'Hondt method ===
The D'Hondt method is a highest averages method that allocates seats by dividing each party's total votes by a series of divisors (1, 2, 3, ...).

- Example (5 seats):

Party	Votes
A	1000
B	800
C	400

Round	A quotient	B quotient	C quotient	Seat to
1	1000	800	400	A
2	500	800	400	B
3	500	400	400	A
4	333.33	400	400	B
5	333.33	266.67	400	C

- Result: A = 2, B = 2, C = 1

=== Sainte-Laguë method ===
The Sainte-Laguë (Webster, Schepers) method is a highest averages method using odd-numbered divisors (1, 3, 5, ...) to promote more equal distribution.

- Same vote totals as above.

Round	A quotient	B quotient	C quotient	Seat to
1	1000	800	400	A
2	333.33	800	400	B
3	333.33	266.67	400	C
4	333.33	266.67	133.33	A
5	200	266.67	133.33	B

- Result: A = 2, B = 2, C = 1

=== Modified Sainte-Laguë method ===
Same as Sainte-Laguë but first divisor is 1.4 to favour larger parties.

- Divisors: 1.4, 3, 5, ...

Round	A quotient	B quotient	C quotient	Seat to
1	714.29	571.43	285.71	A
2	333.33	571.43	285.71	B
3	333.33	266.67	285.71	A
4	200	266.67	285.71	C
5	200	266.67	133.33	B

- Result: A = 2, B = 2, C = 1

=== Hare quota (largest remainder) ===
The Hare quota uses a quota to allocate seats, then gives remaining seats to the parties with the largest remainders.

- Quota = Total votes / Seats = 2200 / 5 = 440

Party	Votes	Initial seats	Remainder
A	1000	2	120
B	800	1	360
C	400	0	400

- Remaining 2 seats to C and B (highest remainders)
- Result: A = 2, B = 2, C = 1

=== Imperiali quota (largest remainder) ===
The Imperiali quota is rarely used; favors large parties more.

- Quota = Total votes / (seats + 2) = 2200 / 7 = ~314.29

Party	Votes	Initial seats	Remainder
A	1000	3	57.14
B	800	2	171.42
C	400	1	85.71

- 1 leftover seat to B
- Result: A = 3, B = 2, C = 1

=== Huntington–Hill method ===
The Huntington–Hill method is used for US congressional apportionment, based on geometric mean. It is too specialized for elections, as it requires every party to have at least one seat.

=== Example ===
Below it can be seen how different apportionment methods yield different results with the same number of seats and votes (100 and 2832 in this example).

As there are 100 seats, the percentage values for every party's share of the vote is equal to the party's vote count divided by the Hare quota (which is the ratio of vote and seat totals), and in this case the share of seats under the largest remainder method using this quota happens to be the same as the percentage values rounded to the nearest integer (because exactly 3 party's results has to be rounded up, same as there are 3 seats to assign with the largest remainder method after 97 seats are assigned based on the integer part of the vote share divided by the Hare quota). The Webster/Sainte-Laguë method yields the same result (but this is not always the case), otherwise all other methods give a different number of seats to the parties.

Notable is how the D'Hondt method breaks the quota rule (shown in red text) and favors the largest party with 37% of seats, even though it only got 35.91% of the vote (the quota rule would allow either 35 or 36 seats in this case = rounding up or rounding down, but no jump to 34 or 37). Also, the Adams and Huntington-Hill methods, which (without a threshold) greatly favour smaller parties gave 2 seats to the smallest party and would have both given at least 1 seat to every party if it got even just 1 vote from 2832. Of the highest average methods, modified versions of the formulas may not be strictly proportional. For example, the Imperiali method (not to be confused with the Imperiali quota) can be seen as a modified version of the D'Hondt (or Adams) method, and it is technically not proportional (e.g., if a party received 500/1000 votes, and there were 100 seats to be apportioned, it may sometimes not only get 50 - the clearly proportional number of seats - but could also get 51). The Macanese modification of the d'Hondt method, whose quotients are based on the formula $\textstyle\frac{V}{2^{s}}$, is clearly disproportional; the great variations between the parties' vote shares are effectively reduced, and each party has a roughly equal number of seats, resulting in either completely equal or degressively proportional representation if the district magnitude is sufficient.

Party	Votes	Entitlement	Largest remainder method				Highest averages method					
Party	Votes	Entitlement	Hare quota	Droop quota	Hagenbach-Bischoff quota	Imperiali quota	D'Hondt (Jefferson)	Adams	Sainte-Laguë (Webster, Schepers)	Huntington-Hill	Imperiali	Macanese D'Hondt
Party	Votes	Entitlement	$\frac{\text{votes}}{\text{seats}}$	$\textstyle\operatorname{Integer} \left( \frac{\text{votes}}{ \text{seats}+1 } \right) + 1$	$\frac{\text{votes}}{\text{seats}+1}$	$\frac{\text{votes}}{\text{seats}+2}$	$\frac{\text{votes}}{\text{seats}+1}$	$\frac{\text{votes}}{\text{seats}}$	$\frac{\text{votes}}{\text{seats}+0.5}$	$\frac{\text{votes}}{\sqrt{\text{seats}(\text{seats}+1)}}$	$\frac{\text{votes}}{\text{seats}+2}$	$\frac{\text{votes}}{2^{\text{seats}}}$
A	1017	35.91	36	35	36	36	37	35	36	36	38	19
B	1000	35.31	35	35	36	36	36	34	35	35	37	18
C	383	13.52	14	14	13	14	13	14	14	13	13	17
D	327	11.55	12	12	12	11	11	12	12	12	11	17
E	63	2.22	2	2	2	2	2	3	2	2	1	15
F	42	1.48	1	2	1	1	1	2	1	2	0	14
Total	2832	100	100	100	100	100	100	100	100	100	100	100

== List of countries using party-list proportional representation ==
Countries with party-list proportional representation (closed list) Countries with party-list proportional representation (open list) Countries with party-list proportional representation (partially open list) Countries with Panachage, a form of open-list party-list proportional representation

The table below lists countries that use a proportional electoral system to fill a nationally elected legislative body. Detailed information on electoral systems applying to the first chamber of the legislature is maintained by the ACE Electoral Knowledge Network. Countries using PR as part of a parallel voting (mixed-member majoritarian) or other mixed system (e.g. MMP) are not included.

Country	Legislative body	List type	Variation of open lists (if applicable)	Apportionment method	Electoral threshold	Constituencies	Governmental system	Notes
Albania	Parliament (Kuvendi)	Open list	?	d'Hondt method	4% nationally or 2.5% in a district	Counties	Parliamentary republic	
Algeria	People's National Assembly	Open list	?	Hare quota	5% of votes in respective district.	Provinces	Semi-presidential republic	
Angola	National Assembly	Closed list	—	d'Hondt method		5 member districts and nationwide	Parliamentary republic with an executive presidency	Double simultaneous vote use to elect the President and the National Assembly at the same election.
Argentina	Chamber of Deputies	Closed list	—	d'Hondt method	3% of registered voters in the constituency	Provinces	Presidential republic	
Armenia	National Assembly	Closed list	—	Hare quota and largest remainders	5% (parties), 8-10% (blocs)	None (single nationwide constituency)	Parliamentary republic	Party lists run-off, but only if necessary to ensure stable majority of 52% if it is not achieved either immediately (one party) or through building a coalition. If a party would win more than 2/3 seats, at least 1/3 seats are distributed to the other parties.
Austria	National Council	Open list	More open: 14% on the district level (among votes for the candidates party)	Hare quota	4% nationally	Single-member districts within federal states (Länder)	Semi-presidential republic, de facto parliamentary	
Austria	National Council	Open list	More open: 10% on the regional (state) level (among votes for the candidates party)	Hare quota	4% nationally	Federal states (Länder)	Semi-presidential republic, de facto parliamentary	
Austria	National Council	Open list	More open: 7% of the on the federal level (among votes for the candidates party)	d'Hondt method	4% nationally	Single federal (nationwide) constituency	Semi-presidential republic, de facto parliamentary	
Belgium	Chamber of Representative	Open list		D'Hondt method	5%	Electoral districts	Federal parliamentary constitutional monarchy	
Bénin	National Assembly	Closed list	—	Largest remainder method	10%	Departments	Presidential republic	
Bolivia	Chamber of Senators	Closed list	—	d'Hondt method	No de jure threshold	Departments	Unitary presidential republic	Ballots use the double simultaneous vote: voters cast a single vote for a presidential candidate and their party's list and local candidates at the same time (vote splitting is not possible/allowed)
Bosnia and Herzegovina	House of Representatives	Open list		Sainte-Laguë method	3% at entity level	Electoral districts	Federal parliamentary directorial republic	
Brazil	Chamber of Deputies	Open list	Fully open	D'Hondt method	2% distributed in at least 9 Federation Units with at least 1% of the valid votes in each one of them	States and Federal District	Presidential republic	
Bulgaria	National Assembly	Open list		Hare quota and largest remainders	4%	Electoral districts	Unitary parliamentary republic	
Cape Verde	National Assembly	Closed list	—	D'Hondt method	No de jure threshold	Electoral districts	Semi-presidential republic	
Chile	Chamber of Deputies	Open list		D'Hondt method	No de jure threshold	Electoral districts	Presidential republic	
Chile	Senate	Open list		D'Hondt method	No de jure threshold	Electoral districts	Presidential republic	
Colombia	Chamber of Representatives	Closed list	—	D'Hondt method	3%	Departments	Unitary presidential republic	
Colombia	Senate	Closed list	—	D'Hondt method	3%	None (votes are tallied in a single nationwide constituency)	Unitary presidential republic	
Costa Rica	Legislative Assembly	Closed list	—	Hare quota and largest remainders(modified)	Subquota (half of Hare quota)	Departments	Presidential republic	
Croatia	Sabor	Open list		D'Hondt method	5%	Constituencies	Parliamentary republic	
Cyprus	House of Representatives	Open list		Hare quota and largest remainders(modified)	No de jure threshold	Electoral districts	Presidential republic	
Czech Republic	Chamber of Deputies	Open list	Relatively open: 5% on the district level (among votes for the candidates party)	Imperiali quota (with negative seats with smallest remainders if needed) with national remnant in the first scrutiny	5% nationally for single party lists, 7% for coalitions of two, 11% for coalitions of more than 2.	Regions and capital	Parliamentary republic	
Czech Republic	Chamber of Deputies	Open list	Relatively open: 5% on the district level (among votes for the candidates party)	Hagenbach-Bischoff quota + largest remainders	5% nationally for single party lists, 7% for coalitions of two, 11% for coalitions of more than 2.	National remnant seats redistributed to districts	Parliamentary republic	
Denmark	Folketing	Open list		Modified Sainte-Laguë method for leveling seats	2%	Electoral districts	Parliamentary republic	135 constituency seats, 40 leveling seats
Dominican Republic	Chamber of Deputies	Closed list	—	D'Hondt method	1% for those that didnt win in any constituency.	Departments	Presidential republic	
Ecuador	National Congress	Closed list	—	Sainte-Laguë method		Provinces	Presidential republic	
El Salvador	Legislative Assembly	Open list		D'Hondt method	10%	Departments	Presidential republic	
Estonia	Riigikogu	Open list		D'Hondt method	5%	Electoral districts	Parliamentary republic	
Fiji	Parilament	Open list		D'Hondt method	5%	None (votes are tallied in a single nationwide constituency)	Parliamentary republic	
Finland	Parliament (Eduskunta)	Open list	Fully open	D'Hondt method	No de jure threshold	Electoral districts	Parliamentary republic	
Germany	Bundestag	Localized list	Separate vote for candidates	Only first place candidate may win seat (but not guaranteed to)	5% or 3 constituencies, first place for independents (only in constituencies)	Constituencies (single-member)	Federal parliamentary republic	The system was recently modified to an essentially (non-mixed) closed list proportional system with a local constituency vote to eliminate the need for overhang seats. In the new system, the number of seats a party can win is capped, if they "won" more seats by plurality, not all of their winners will be elected.
Germany	Bundestag	Closed list	—	Sainte-Laguë method	5% or 3 constituencies, first place for independents (only in constituencies)	Federal states (Länder)	Federal parliamentary republic	The system was recently modified to an essentially (non-mixed) closed list proportional system with a local constituency vote to eliminate the need for overhang seats. In the new system, the number of seats a party can win is capped, if they "won" more seats by plurality, not all of their winners will be elected.
Guatemala	Congress of the Republic	Closed list	—	D'Hondt method		Departments	Presidential republic	
Guyana	National Assembly	Closed list	—	Hare quota + largest remainders	No de jure threshold	Regional constituencies	Parliamentary republic with an executive president	The president is elected by a first-past-the-post double simultaneous vote system, whereby each list nominates a presidential candidate and the presidential election itself is won by the candidate of the list having a plurality.
Guyana	National Assembly	Closed list	—	Hare quota + largest remainders	No de jure threshold	National constituency	Parliamentary republic with an executive president	The president is elected by a first-past-the-post double simultaneous vote system, whereby each list nominates a presidential candidate and the presidential election itself is won by the candidate of the list having a plurality.
Honduras	National Congress	Open list	Fully open with panachage (free lists)			Departments	Presidential republic	
Iceland	Althing	Open list				Regions	Parliamentary republic	
Indonesia	House of Representative	Open list		Sainte-Laguë method	4%	3 to 10 members constituencies	Presidential system	
Israel	Knesset	Closed list	—		3.25%	None (single nationwide constituency)	Parliamentary system	
Kosovo	Assembly of the Republic	Open list		Sainte-Laguë method		None (single nationwide constituency)		
Latvia	Saeima	Open list		Sainte-Laguë method	5%	Regions	Parliamentary republic	
Lebanon	Parliament	Open list				Regions		
Liechtenstein	Landtag	Open list			8%	Regions		
Luxembourg	Chamber of Deputies	Open list	Panachage (number of votes equal to the number of members elected)	d'Hondt method	No de jure threshold	Four multi-member constituencies, ranging from 7 to 23 members	Parliamentary system	
Macedonia	Assembly	Closed list	—			Regions	Parliamentary system	
Moldova	Parliament	Closed list	—	d'Hondt method	5% (party), 7% (electoral block), 2% (independent)	None (single nationwide constituency)	Unitary parliamentary republic	
Montenegro	Parilament	Closed list	—	d'Hondt method	3%	None (single nationwide constituency)	Parliamentary system	
Namibia	National Assembly	Closed list	—			None (single nationwide constituency)	Presidential republic	
Netherlands	House of Representatives	Open list	More open (25% of the quota to override the default party-list)	d'Hondt method	No de jure threshold, but an effective threshold of 0.67% (1/150) for a seat	None (single nationwide constituency)	Parliamentary system	
Norway	Parliament (Storting)	Closed list	—	modified Sainte-Laguë method	No de jure threshold	19 multi-member constituencies	Parliamentary system	First divisor is 1,4 instead of 1.
Norway	Parliament (Storting)	Closed list	4% for leveling seats	modified Sainte-Laguë method	One seat in each constituency is used for nationwide leveling		Parliamentary system	First divisor is 1,4 instead of 1.
Paraguay	Chamber of Deputies	Closed list	—			Departments	Presidential republic	
Peru	Congress of the Republic	Closed list	—	d'Hondt method	5%	Departments	Presidential republic	
Poland	Sejm	Open list	Fully open	d'Hondt method	5% (parties) or 8% (coalitions) nationally, no threshold for national minority organisations	41 multi-member constituencies, ranging from 7 to 20 members	Semi-presidential republic	
Portugal	Assembly of the Republic	Closed list	—	d'Hondt method	No de jure threshold	Districts	Semi-presidential republic	
Romania	Chamber of Deputies	Closed list	—			Counties	Presidential republic	
San Marino	Grand and General Council	Open list			3.5%	None (single nationwide constituency)		If needed to ensure a stable majority, the two best-placed parties participate in a run-off vote to receive a majority bonus.
São Tomé and Príncipe	National Assembly	Closed list	—			Constituencies		
Serbia	National Assembly	Closed list	—		3%	None (single nationwide constituency)	Parliamentary republic	
Sierra Leone	Parliament of Sierra Leone		—			Districts	Presidential republic	
Slovakia	National Council	Open list		Droop quota and largest remainders	5%	None (single nationwide constituency)	Parliamentary republic	
Slovenia	National Assembly	Open list	Fully open	Droop quota	4%	Districts	Parliamentary republic	
Slovenia	National Assembly	Open list	Fully open	d'Hondt method	4%	Districts	Parliamentary republic	
South Africa	National Assembly of South Africa	Closed list	—	Droop quota	No de jure threshold	Provinces of South Africa	Parliamentary republic with an executive president	
Spain	Congress of Deputies	Closed list	—	d'Hondt method	3%	Provinces of Spain	Parliamentary system	
Sri Lanka	Parliament	Open list (for 196/225 seats)	Panachage (up to 3 preference votes)	d'Hondt method	5% (per constituency)	Constituencies	Semi-presidential system	
Sri Lanka	Parliament	Closed list (for 29/225 seats)	—	?	No de jure threshold	None (single nationwide constituency)	Semi-presidential system	
Suriname	National Assembly	Open list	Fully open	d'Hondt method	No de jure threshold	Districts of Suriname	Assembly-independent republic	
Sweden	Riksdag	Open list	More open (5% of the party vote to override the default party-list)	Sainte-Laguë method (leveling seats)	4% nationally or 12% in a given constituency	Counties of Sweden (some counties are further subdivided)	Parliamentary system	
Switzerland	National Council	Open list	Fully open with panachage (free lists)	Hagenbach-Bischoff system	No de jure threshold	Cantons of Switzerland	Semi-direct democracy under an assembly-independent directorial republic	
Timor-Leste	National Parliament	Open list		d'Hondt method		None (single nationwide constituency)		
Tunisia	Assembly of the Representatives of the People	Closed list	—	Largest remainder method	No de jure threshold	Constituencies	Semi-presidential system	
Turkey	Grand National Assembly	Closed list	—	d'Hondt method	7%. No threshold for independent candidates.	Provinces of Turkey (some provinces are further subdivided)	Presidential system	
Uruguay	Chamber of Representatives	Closed list	—	d'Hondt method	No de jure threshold	Departments of Uruguay	Presidential system	Ballots use the double simultaneous vote, the same ballot is used for electing the president (first round) and the two chambers
Uruguay	Chamber of Senators	Closed list	—	d'Hondt method	No de jure threshold	None (single nationwide constituency)	Presidential system	Ballots use the double simultaneous vote, the same ballot is used for electing the president (first round) and the two chambers

=== Subnational level ===
Country	Legislative body	List type	Variation of open lists (if applicable)	Apportionment method	Electoral threshold	Constituencies	Governmental system	Notes
Aruba	Parliament	Open list		D'Hondt method	No de jure threshold	None (single nationwide constituency)		
Faroe Islands	Løgting	Open list		D'Hondt method		None (votes are tallied in a single nationwide constituency)	Parliamentary republic	
Greenland	Inatsisartut	Open list		D'Hondt method		None (votes are tallied in a single nationwide constituency)	Parliamentary republic	
Sint Maarten	Parilament	Open list				None (single nationwide constituency)	Parliamentary republic	
Wales	Senedd	Closed list	—	d'Hondt method	No de jure threshold	16 Senedd constituencies, each electing 6 Members of the Senedd (MSs)	Devolved legislature	

=== Authoritarian regimes ===
Country	Legislative body	List type	Apportionment method	Electoral threshold	Constituencies	Governmental system	Notes
Burkina Faso	National Assembly	Closed list			Constituencies	Semi-presidential republic	
Burundi	National Assembly	Closed list	D'Hondt method	2%	Constituencies	Presidential republic	
Cambodia	National Assembly	Closed list	D'Hondt method		Constituencies	Constitutional monarchy	
Equatorial Guinea	Chamber of Deputies	Closed list		10%	Constituencies	Presidential republic	
Equatorial Guinea	Senate	Closed list			Constituencies	Presidential republic	
Guinea-Bissau	National People's Assembly	Closed list				Semi-presidential republic	
Mozambique		Closed list					
Rwanda		Closed list					
Togo	National Assembly	Closed list	Highest averages method	No threshold	Constituencies	Presidential system	

== See also ==
- Comparison of the Hare and Droop quotas
- General ticket (party block voting), a term usually given to less or non proportional equivalents
- Mixed-member proportional representation, a kind of party-list proportional representation
- Leveling seats
- List MP
- Ley de Lemas
- Sectoral representation in the House of Representatives of the Philippines
- Outline of democracy
