= Proportionality for solid coalitions =

Criterion for proportional representation

Proportionality for solid coalitions (PSC) is a criterion of proportionality for ranked voting systems. It is an adaptation of the quota rule to voting systems in which there are no official party lists, and voters can directly support candidates. The criterion was first proposed by the British philosopher and logician Michael Dummett.

PSC is a relatively minimal definition of proportionality. To be guaranteed representation, a coalition of voters must rank all candidates within the same party first before candidates of other parties. And PSC does not guarantee proportional representation if voters rank candidates of different parties together (as they will no longer form a solid coalition).

== Solid coalitions ==
In party-list systems, proportional representation guarantees each party a number of representatives proportional to its number of votes. In systems without parties, the natural analogue of a "party" is a solid coalition. A solid coalition is a group of voters who prefer any candidate within a certain set of candidates over any candidate not in the set. A set of voters $V$ is a solid coalition for a set of candidates $C$, if every voter in $V$ ranks every candidate in $C$ ahead of every candidate that is not in $C$.

When a voter is part of a solid coalition that prefers some set of candidates, they are said to be "solidly supporting" or "solidly committed to" that set of candidates. Any voter who ranks a candidate as their first-preference solidly supports that candidate.

Note that a solid coalition may be "nested" within another solid coalition, so there may be some faction of voters that can further be split into subfactions. However, solid coalitions cannot cut across different factions. For example, say voters are organized along a political spectrum, with factions on the far-left, center-left, center, center-right, and far-right. Then, the three moderate groups will not form a solid coalition, because some members of the center-right may not rank the center-left candidate above the far-right candidate.

== Quotas ==
In the following let $n$ be the number of voters, $k$ be the number of seats to be filled and $j$ be some positive integer.

$k$–PSC or Hare-PSC is defined with respect to the Hare quota $n/k$. It says that if there is a solid coalition for a set of candidates with at least $j$ Hare quotas, then at least $j$ candidates from this set must be elected. (If $C$ has less than $j$ candidates, all of them must be elected). This criterion was proposed by Michael Dummett.

In the single-winner case, it is equivalent to the unanimity criterion, as a Hare quota in the single-winner case includes all voters.

$k+1$–PSC, also called Droop-PSC, is defined like $k$–PSC but using the Droop quota $n/(k+1)$ instead of the Hare quota, i.e. $j$ Droop quotas entitle a solid coalition to $j$ candidates.

It is a generalization of the majority criterion in the sense that it relates to groups of supported candidates (solid coalitions) instead of just one candidate, and there may be more than one seat to be filled. An advantage of Droop proportionality is that any solid coalition with a majority will always be able to elect at least half of seats. However, this comes at the cost of a substantial seat bias in favor of larger parties. This means a coalition of smaller parties who together win a majority of the vote can nevertheless fail to reach a majority in the legislature.

Examples of quota-proportional methods include the expanding approvals rule, the method of equal shares, and the single transferable vote.

== Generalizations ==
Aziz and Lee define a property called generalized PSC, and another property, called inclusion PSC, that apply also to weak rankings (rankings with indifferences). Their expanding approvals rule satisfies these generalizations of PSC.

Brill and Peters define a fairness property called Rank-PJR+, which also applies to weak rankings, but makes positive guarantees also to coalitions that are only partially solid. Rank-PJR+ is attained by the expanding approvals rule, but violated by the single transferable vote. It can be decided in polynomial time whether a given committee satisfies Rank-PJR+.

== See also ==
- Justified representation – properties analogous to proportional representation for electoral systems using approval ballots.
