= Highest averages method =

Rule for proportional allocation

The highest averages, divisor, or divide-and-round methods are a family of apportionment rules, i.e. algorithms for fair division of seats in a legislature between several groups (like political parties or states). More generally, divisor methods are used to round shares of a total to a fraction with a fixed denominator (e.g. percentage points, which must add up to 100).

The methods aim to treat voters equally by ensuring legislators represent an equal number of voters by ensuring every party has the same seats-to-votes ratio (or divisor). Such methods divide the number of votes by the number of votes per seat to get the final apportionment. By doing so, the method maintains proportional representation, as a party with e.g. twice as many votes will win about twice as many seats.

The divisor methods are generally preferred by social choice theorists and mathematicians to the largest remainder methods, as they produce more-proportional results by most metrics and are less susceptible to apportionment paradoxes. In particular, divisor methods avoid the population paradox and spoiler effects, unlike the largest remainder methods.

== History ==
Divisor methods were first invented by Thomas Jefferson to comply with the United States Constitution's requirement that states have at most one representative per 30,000 people. His solution was to divide each state's population by 30,000 before rounding down.

Apportionment would become a major topic of debate in the US Congress, especially after the discovery of pathologies in many superficially-reasonable rounding rules. Similar debates would appear in Europe and Latin America after the adoption of proportional representation, typically as a result of large parties attempting to introduce thresholds and other barriers to entry for small parties. Such apportionments often have substantial consequences, as in the redistribution of seats in the US Congress following the 1870 United States census, which employed an ad-hoc calculation favoring Republican-leaning states. Had each state's electoral vote total been exactly equal to its entitlement, or had this redistribution used the Webster/Sainte-Laguë method or a largest remainders method, the 1876 United States presidential election would have been won by Samuel J. Tilden rather than its eventual winner Rutherford B. Hayes.

== Definitions ==
The two names for these methods—highest averages and divisors—reflect two different ways of thinking about them, and their two independent inventions. However, both procedures are equivalent and give the same answer.

Divisor methods are based on rounding rules, defined using a signpost sequence post(k), where k ≤ post(k) ≤ k+1. Each signpost marks the boundary between natural numbers, with numbers being rounded down if and only if they are less than the signpost.

=== Divisor procedure ===
The divisor procedure apportions seats by searching for a divisor or electoral quota. This divisor can be thought of as the number of votes a party needs to earn one additional seat in the legislature, or the number of voters represented by each individual legislator (in systems using single-member constituencies, this is coterminous with the ideal population of the constituency).

If each legislator represented an equal number of voters, the number of seats for each party could be found by dividing the population by the divisor. However, seat allocations must be whole numbers, so to find the apportionment for a given party we must round (using the signpost sequence) after dividing. Thus, each party's apportionment is given by:

$$\text{seats} = \operatorname{round}\left(\frac{\text{votes}}{\text{divisor}}\right)$$

Usually, it is initially set to equal the Hare quota. However, this procedure may assign too many or too few seats. In this case the apportionments for each party will not add up to the total legislature size. A feasible divisor can be found by trial and error. Given that the divisor is some approximation of the ratio of total votes to total seats, this operation can be viewed as varying that total number of seats and letting the rounding compensate it back to the actual legislature size.

=== Highest averages procedure ===
With the highest averages algorithm, every party begins with 0 seats. Then, at each iteration, we allocate a seat to the party with the highest vote average, i.e. the party with the most votes per seat. This method proceeds until all seats are allocated.

However, it is unclear whether it is better to look at the vote average before assigning the seat, what the average will be after assigning the seat, or if we should compromise with a continuity correction. These approaches each give slightly different apportionments. Many electoral laws use the average before assigning the seat. In general, we can define the averages using the signpost sequence:

$$\text{average} := \frac{\text{votes}}{\operatorname{post}(\text{seats})}$$

== Specific methods ==
While all divisor methods share the same general procedure, they differ in the choice of signpost sequence and therefore rounding rule. Note that for methods where the first signpost is zero, every party with at least one vote will receive a seat before any party receives a second seat; in practice, this typically means that every party must receive at least one seat, unless disqualified by some electoral threshold.

Divisor formulas
Method	Signposts (divisor procedure)	Signposts (highest averages procedure)	Rounding of Seats	Approx. first values (divisor procedure)	Approx. first values (highest averages procedure)
Adams	k	N/A	Up	0.00 1.00 2.00 3.00	N/A
Dean	2÷(1/k + 1/(k+1))	N/A	Harmonic	0.00 1.33 2.40 3.43	N/A
Huntington–Hill	$\sqrt{k(k+1)}$	N/A	Geometric	0.00 1.41 2.45 3.46	N/A
Stationary (e.g. r = 3)	k + 1/r	r × k + 1	Weighted	0.33 1.33 2.33 3.33	1.00 4.00 7.00 10.00
Webster/Sainte-Laguë	k + 1/2	2k + 1	Arithmetic	0.50 1.50 2.50 3.50	1.00 3.00 5.00 7.00
Power mean (e.g. p = 2)	$\sqrt[p]{(k^p + (k+1)^p)/2}$	—	Power mean	0.71 1.58 2.55 3.54	—
D'Hondt	k + 1	k + 1	Down	1.00 2.00 3.00 4.00	1.00 2.00 3.00 4.00
Imperiali	1/2k + 1	k + 2	N/A	1.00 1.50 2.00 2.50	2.00 3.00 4.00 5.00
Macanese D'Hondt	—	2^{k}	N/A	—	1.00 2.00 4.00 8.00

=== D'Hondt (Jefferson) method ===
Thomas Jefferson was the first to propose a divisor method, in 1792; it was later independently developed by Belgian political scientist Victor d'Hondt in 1878. It assigns the representative to the list that would be most underrepresented at the end of the round. It remains the most-common method for proportional representation to this day.

The D'Hondt method uses the sequence $\operatorname{post}(k) = k+1$, i.e. (1, 2, 3, ...), which means it will always round a party's apportionment down.

An apportionment under the D'Hondt method never falls below the lower end of the ideal frame, and it minimizes the worst-case overrepresentation in the legislature. However, it performs poorly when judged by most other metrics of proportionality. The rule typically gives large parties an excessive number of seats, with their seat share often exceeding their entitlement rounded up.

This pathology led to widespread mockery of the D'Hondt method when it was learned the D'Hondt method could "round" New York's apportionment of 40.5 up to 42, with Senator Mahlon Dickerson saying the extra seat must come from the "ghosts of departed representatives".

=== Adams' method ===
Adams' method was conceived of by John Quincy Adams after noticing the D'Hondt method allocated too few seats to smaller states. It can be described as the inverse of the D'Hondt method; it awards a seat to the party that has the most votes per seat before the new seat is added. The divisor function is post(k) = k, which is equivalent to always rounding up.

Adams' apportionment never exceeds the upper end of the ideal frame, and minimizes the worst-case underrepresentation. However, like the D'Hondt method, Adams' method performs poorly according to most metrics of proportionality. It also often violates the lower seat quota.

Adams' method was suggested as part of the Cambridge compromise for apportionment of European parliament seats to member states, with the aim of satisfying degressive proportionality.

=== Webster/Sainte-Laguë (Schepers) method ===
The Webster/Sainte-Laguë method was first described in 1832 by American statesman and senator Daniel Webster and later independently in 1910 by the French mathematician André Sainte-Laguë. In 1980 the German physicist Hans Schepers, at the time Head of the Data Processing Group of the Bundestag, suggested that the distribution of seats according to the D'Hondt method be modified to avoid putting smaller parties at a disadvantage. German media started using the term Schepers Method and later German literature usually calls it Sainte-Laguë/Schepers.

The Webster/Sainte-Laguë method uses the fencepost sequence post(k) = k+.5 (i.e. 0.5, 1.5, 2.5); this corresponds to the standard rounding rule. Equivalently, the odd integers (1, 3, 5...) can be used to calculate the averages instead; the odd-number expression is more common in electoral laws.

The Webster/Sainte-Laguë method shows a more equal seats-to-votes ratio for different sized parties among apportionment methods; it produces more proportional apportionments than D'Hondt by almost every metric of misrepresentation. As such, it is typically preferred to D'Hondt by political scientists and mathematicians, at least in situations where manipulation is difficult or unlikely (as in large parliaments). It is also notable for minimizing seat bias even when dealing with parties that win very small numbers of seats. The Webster/Sainte-Laguë method can theoretically violate the ideal frame, although this is extremely rare for even moderately-large parliaments; it has never been observed to violate quota in any United States congressional apportionment.

In small districts with no threshold, parties can manipulate the Webster/Sainte-Laguë method by splitting into many lists, each of which wins a full seat with less than a Hare quota's worth of votes. This is often addressed by modifying the first divisor to be slightly larger (often a value of 0.7 or 1 instead of 0.5, equal to 1.4 or 2 instead of 1), which creates an implicit threshold.

=== Huntington–Hill method ===
In the Huntington–Hill method, the signpost sequence is post(k) = √k (k+1), the geometric mean of the neighboring numbers. Conceptually, this method rounds to the integer that has the smallest relative (percent) difference. For example, the difference between 2.47 and 3 is about 19%, while the difference from 2 is about 21%, so 2.47 is rounded up. This method is used for allotting seats in the US House of Representatives among the states.

The Huntington–Hill method tends to produce very similar results to the Webster/Sainte-Laguë method, except that it guarantees every state or party at least one seat (see Highest averages method § Zero-seat apportionments). When first used to assign seats in the US House of Representatives, the two methods produced identical results; in their second use, they differed only in assigning a single seat to Michigan or Arkansas.

== Comparison of properties ==
=== Zero-seat apportionments ===
Huntington–Hill, Dean, and Adams' method all have a value of 0 for the first fencepost, giving an average of ∞. Thus, without a threshold, all parties that have received at least one vote will also receive at least one seat. This property can be desirable (as when assigning seats to constituencies in a reapportionment operation) or undesirable (as when assigning seats to party lists in an election), in which case the first divisor may be adjusted to create a natural threshold.

=== Bias ===
There are many metrics of seat bias. While the Webster/Sainte-Laguë method is sometimes described as "uniquely" unbiased, this uniqueness property relies on a technical definition of bias, which is defined as the average difference between a state's number of seats and its seat entitlement. In other words, a method is called unbiased if the number of seats a state receives is, on average across many elections, equal to its seat entitlement.

By this definition, the Webster/Sainte-Laguë method is the least-biased apportionment method, while Huntington–Hill exhibits a mild bias towards smaller parties. However, other researchers have noted that slightly different definitions of bias, generally based on percent errors, find the opposite result (The Huntington–Hill method is unbiased, while the Webster/Sainte-Laguë method is slightly biased towards large parties).

In practice, the difference between these definitions is small when handling parties or states with more than one seat. Thus, both the Huntington–Hill and Webster/Sainte-Laguë methods can be considered unbiased or low-bias methods (unlike the D'Hondt or Adams methods). A 1929 report to the US Congress by the National Academy of Sciences recommended the Huntington–Hill method, while the Supreme Court of the United States has ruled the choice between these systems to be a matter of opinion.

== Comparison and examples ==
=== Example: D'Hondt ===
The following example shows how the D'Hondt method can differ substantially from less-biased methods such as Webster/Sainte-Laguë. In this election, the largest party wins 46% of the vote, but takes 52.5% of the seats, enough to win a majority outright against a coalition of all other parties (which together reach 54% of the vote). Moreover, it does this in violation of quota: the largest party is entitled only to 9.7 seats, but it wins 11 regardless. The largest congressional district is nearly twice the size of the smallest district. The Webster/Sainte-Laguë method shows none of these properties, with a maximum error of 22.6%.

D'Hondt							Webster/Sainte-Laguë						
Party	Yellow	White	Red	Green	Purple	Total	Party	Yellow	White	Red	Green	Purple	Total
Votes	46,000	25,100	12,210	8,350	8,340	100,000	Votes	46,000	25,100	12,210	8,350	8,340	100,000
Seats	11	6	2	1	1	21	Seats	9	5	3	2	2	21
Ideal	9.660	5.271	2.564	1.754	1.751	21	Ideal	9.660	5.271	2.564	1.754	1.751	21
Votes/Seat	4182	4183	6105	8350	8340	4762	Votes/Seat	5111	5020	4070	4175	4170	4762
% Error	13.0%	13.0%	-24.8%	-56.2%	-56.0%	(100.%)	(% Range)	-7.1%	-5.3%	15.7%	13.2%	13.3%	(22.6%)
Seats	Averages					Signposts	Seats	Averages					Signposts
1	46,000	25,100	12,210	8,350	8,340	1.00	1	92,001	50,201	24,420	16,700	16,680	0.50
2	23,000	12,550	6,105	4,175	4,170	2.00	2	30,667	16,734	8,140	5,567	5,560	1.50
3	15,333	8,367	4,070	2,783	2,780	3.00	3	18,400	10,040	4,884	3,340	3,336	2.50
4	11,500	6,275	3,053	2,088	2,085	4.00	4	13,143	7,172	3,489	2,386	2,383	3.50
5	9,200	5,020	2,442	1,670	1,668	5.00	5	10,222	5,578	2,713	1,856	1,853	4.50
6	7,667	4,183	2,035	1,392	1,390	6.00	6	8,364	4,564	2,220	1,518	1,516	5.50
7	6,571	3,586	1,744	1,193	1,191	7.00	7	7,077	3,862	1,878	1,285	1,283	6.50
8	5,750	3,138	1,526	1,044	1,043	8.00	8	6,133	3,347	1,628	1,113	1,112	7.50
9	5,111	2,789	1,357	928	927	9.00	9	5,412	2,953	1,436	982	981	8.50
10	4,600	2,510	1,221	835	834	10.00	10	4,842	2,642	1,285	879	878	9.50
11	4,182	2,282	1,110	759	758	11.00	11	4,381	2,391	1,163	795	794	10.50

=== Example: Adams ===
The following example shows a case where Adams' method fails to give a majority to a party winning 55% of the vote, again in violation of their quota entitlement.

Adams' Method							Webster/Sainte-Laguë Method						
Party	Yellow	White	Red	Green	Purple	Total	Party	Yellow	White	Red	Green	Purple	Total
Votes	55,000	17,290	16,600	5,560	5,550	100,000	Votes	55,000	17,290	16,600	5,560	5,550	100,000
Seats	10	4	3	2	2	21	Seats	11	4	4	1	1	21
Ideal	11.550	3.631	3.486	1.168	1.166	21	Ideal	11.550	3.631	3.486	1.168	1.166	21
Votes/Seat	5500	4323	5533	2780	2775	4762	Votes/Seat	4583	4323	5533	5560	5550	4762
% Error	-14.4%	9.7%	-15.0%	53.8%	54.0%	(99.4%)	(% Range)	3.8%	9.7%	-15.0%	-15.5%	-15.3%	(28.6%)
Seats	Averages					Signposts	Seats	Averages					Signposts
1	∞	∞	∞	∞	∞	0.00	1	110,001	34,580	33,200	11,120	11,100	0.50
2	55,001	17,290	16,600	5,560	5,550	1.00	2	36,667	11,527	11,067	3,707	3,700	1.50
3	27,500	8,645	8,300	2,780	2,775	2.00	3	22,000	6,916	6,640	2,224	2,220	2.50
4	18,334	5,763	5,533	1,853	1,850	3.00	4	15,714	4,940	4,743	1,589	1,586	3.50
5	13,750	4,323	4,150	1,390	1,388	4.00	5	12,222	3,842	3,689	1,236	1,233	4.50
6	11,000	3,458	3,320	1,112	1,110	5.00	6	10,000	3,144	3,018	1,011	1,009	5.50
7	9,167	2,882	2,767	927	925	6.00	7	8,462	2,660	2,554	855	854	6.50
8	7,857	2,470	2,371	794	793	7.00	8	7,333	2,305	2,213	741	740	7.50
9	6,875	2,161	2,075	695	694	8.00	9	6,471	2,034	1,953	654	653	8.50
10	6,111	1,921	1,844	618	617	9.00	10	5,790	1,820	1,747	585	584	9.50
11	5,500	1,729	1,660	556	555	10.00	11	5,238	1,647	1,581	530	529	10.50
Seats	10	4	3	2	2		Seats	11	4	4	1	1	

=== Example: All systems ===
The following shows a worked-out example for all voting systems. Notice how Huntington–Hill and Adams' methods give every party one seat before assigning any more, unlike Webster/Sainte-Laguë or D'Hondt, as well as how the Macanese d'Hondt system creates degressive proportionality in the allocation of seats.

	D'Hondt method						Webster/Sainte-Laguë method						Huntington–Hill method						Adams method						Imperiali method						Macanese method					
party	Yellow	White	Red	Green	Blue	Pink	Yellow	White	Red	Green	Blue	Pink	Yellow	White	Red	Green	Blue	Pink	Yellow	White	Red	Green	Blue	Pink	Yellow	White	Red	Green	Blue	Pink	Yellow	White	Red	Green	Blue	Pink
votes	47,000	16,000	15,900	12,000	6,000	3,100	47,000	16,000	15,900	12,000	6,000	3,100	47,000	16,000	15,900	12,000	6,000	3,100	47,000	16,000	15,900	12,000	6,000	3,100	47,000	16,000	15,900	12,000	6,000	3,100	47,000	16,000	15,900	12,000	6,000	3,100
seats	5	2	2	1	0	0	4	2	2	1	1	0	4	2	1	1	1	1	3	2	2	1	1	1	7	1	1	1	0	0	3	2	2	2	1	0
votes/seat	9,400	8,000	7,950	12,000	∞	∞	11,750	8,000	7,950	12,000	6,000	∞	11,750	8,000	15,900	12,000	6,000	3,100	15,667	8,000	7,950	12,000	6,000	3,100	6,714	16,000	15,900	12,000	∞	∞	15,667	8,000	15,900	12,000	6,000	∞
seat	seat allocation						seat allocation						seat allocation						seat allocation						seat allocation						seat allocation					
1	47,000						47,000						∞						∞						23,500						47,000					
2	23,500							16,000						∞						∞					15,667						23,500					
3		16,000							15,900						∞						∞				11,750							16,000				
4			15,900				15,667									∞						∞			9,400								15,900			
5	15,667									12,000							∞						∞			8,000								12,000		
6				12,000			9,400											∞						∞			7,950				11,750					
7	11,750						6,714						33,234						47,000						7,833							8,000				
8	9,400										6,000		19,187						23,500						6,714								7,950			
9		8,000						5,333					13,567							16,000								6,000							6,000	
10			7,950						5,300					11,314							15,900				5,875									6,000		

=== Stationary calculator ===
The following table calculates the apportionment for any stationary signpost function. In other words, it rounds an apportionment if the vote average is above the selected bar.

== Properties ==
=== Monotonicity ===
Divisor methods are generally preferred by mathematicians to largest remainder methods because they are less susceptible to apportionment paradoxes. In particular, divisor methods satisfy population monotonicity, i.e. voting for a party can never cause it to lose seats. Such population paradoxes occur by increasing the electoral quota, which can cause different states' remainders to respond erratically. Divisor methods also satisfy resource or house monotonicity, which says that increasing the number of seats in a legislature should not cause a state to lose a seat.

=== Min-Max inequality ===
Every divisor method can be defined using the min-max inequality. Letting brackets denote array indexing, an allocation is valid if-and-only-if:

max votes[party]/ post(seats[party]) ≤ min votes[party]/( post(seats[party]+1))

In other words, it is impossible to lower the highest vote average by reassigning a seat from one party to another. Every number in this range is a possible divisor. If the inequality is strict, the solution is unique; otherwise, there is an exactly tied vote in the final apportionment stage.

=== Quota rule violation ===
On the negative side, divisor methods might violate the quota rule: they might give some agents less than their lower quota (quota rounded down) or more than their upper quota (quota rounded up). This can be fixed by using quota-capped divisor methods, at the cost of losing population monotonicity.

Simulation experiments show that different divisor methods have greatly different probabilities of violating quota (when the number of votes is selected by an exponential distribution):

- The probability for Adams and D'Hondt is 98%;
- The probability for D'Hondt with a minimum requirement of 1 is 78%;
- The probability for Dean is about 9%, and for Huntington–Hill about 4%;
- The probability for Webster/Sainte-Laguë is the smallest - only 0.16%.

== Method families ==
The divisor methods described above can be generalized into families.

=== Generalized average ===
In general, it is possible to construct an apportionment method from any generalized average function, by defining the signpost function as post(k) = avg(k, k+1).

==== Stationary family ====
A divisor method is called stationary if for some real number $r\in[0,1]$, its signposts are of the form $d(k) = k+r$. The Adams, Webster/Sainte-Laguë, and d'Hondt methods are stationary, while Dean and Huntington–Hill are not. A stationary method corresponds to rounding numbers up if they exceed the weighted arithmetic mean of k and k+1. Smaller values of r are friendlier to smaller parties.

Danish elections allocate leveling seats at the province level using-member constituencies. It divides the number of votes received by a party in a multi-member constituency by 0.33, 1.33, 2.33, 3.33 etc. The fencepost sequence is given by post(k) = k+1/3; this aims to allocate seats closer to equally, rather than exactly proportionally.

==== Power mean family ====
The power mean family of divisor methods includes the Adams, Huntington–Hill, Webster/Sainte-Laguë, Dean, and D'Hondt methods (either directly or as limits). For a given constant p, the power mean method has signpost function post(k) = ^{_{p}}√k^{p} + (k+1)^{p}. The Huntington–Hill method corresponds to the limit as p tends to 0, while Adams and D'Hondt represent the limits as p tends to negative or positive infinity.

The family also includes the less-common Dean's method for p=-1, which corresponds to the harmonic mean. Dean's method is equivalent to rounding to the nearest average—every state has its seat count rounded in a way that minimizes the difference between the average district size and the ideal district size. For example:

The 1830 representative population of Massachusetts was 610,408: if it received 12 seats its average constituency size would be 50,867; if it received 13 it would be 46,954. So, if the divisor were 47,700 as Polk proposed, Massachusetts should receive 13 seats because 46,954 is closer to 47,700 than is 50,867.

Rounding to the vote average with the smallest relative error once again yields the Huntington–Hill method because |log(x/y)| = |log(y/x)|, i.e. relative differences are reversible. This fact was central to Edward V. Huntington's use of relative (instead of absolute) errors in measuring misrepresentation, and to his advocacy for Hill's rule: Huntington argued the choice of apportionment method should not depend on how the equation for equal representation is rearranged, and only the relative error (minimized by Hill's rule) satisfies this property.

==== Stolarsky mean family ====
Similarly, the Stolarsky mean can be used to define a family of divisor methods that minimizes the generalized entropy index of misrepresentation. This family includes the logarithmic mean, the geometric mean, the identric mean and the arithmetic mean. The Stolarsky means can be justified as minimizing these misrepresentation metrics, which are of major importance in the study of information theory.

== Modifications ==
=== Thresholds ===
Many countries have electoral thresholds for representation, where parties must win a specified fraction of the vote in order to be represented; parties with fewer votes than the threshold requires for representation are eliminated. Other countries modify the first divisor to introduce a natural threshold; when using the Webster/Sainte-Laguë method, the first divisor is often set to 0.7 or 1.0 (the latter being called the full-seat modification).

=== Majority-preservation and majority-prevention clauses ===
A majority-preservation clause guarantees any party winning a majority of the vote will receive at least half the seats in a legislature. Without such a clause, it is possible for a party with slightly more than half the vote to receive just barely less than half the seats (if using a method other than D'Hondt). This is typically accomplished by adding seats to the legislature until an apportionment that preserves the majority for a parliament is found.

Conversely, a majority-prevention clause guarantees that no party will receive more than half the seats in a legislature unless it wins a majority of the vote; this is accomplished by calculating an "incomplete" fencepost sequence which only covers the first half of the seats, while the fenceposts for the second half are only calculated for the party which wins a majority of the vote. This clause is encountered in the electoral law of Israel..

=== Surplus vote agreement ===
Some electoral systems, such as national parliament elections in Switzerland and Israel, and European Parliament elections in Denmark, permit surplus vote agreements, whereby two or more parties are regarded as a single bloc for the purposes of seat allocation; within this bloc, a second seat allocation takes place between the parties to the agreement.

=== Quota-capped divisor method ===
A quota-capped divisor method is an apportionment method where we begin by assigning every state its lower quota of seats. Then, we add seats one-by-one to the state with the highest votes-per-seat average, so long as adding an additional seat does not result in the state exceeding its upper quota. However, quota-capped divisor methods violate the participation criterion (also called population monotonicity)—it is possible for a party to lose a seat as a result of winning more votes.
