= Electoral quota =

Number of votes a candidate needs to win

An electoral quota is the number of votes a candidate needs to be guaranteed election in some proportional representation systems where a formula other than plurality is used to allocate seats.

Generally quotas are set at a level that is guaranteed to apportion only as many seats as are being filled in the contest. Hence, the Droop quota (votes/seats+1, plus 1) is used. When the electorate is divided into separate districts, the quota is commonly set by reference to the number of valid votes cast in the district and the number of seats in the district.

The quota may be set at a number between:

$\frac{\text{votes}}{\text{seats}+1} \leq \text{quota} \leq \frac{\text{votes}}{\text{seats}-1}$

The smallest quota given above, votes/seats+1, is sometimes defended. Such a quota may be workable as long as rules are in place for dealing with situations where two or more tied candidates are competing for a lesser number of seats.

The common quotas used in single transferable voting elections (Hare and Droop) are such that no more can achieve quota than the number of seats in the district. However, some systems use a smaller quota, the Imperiali quota (votes/seats+2, plus 1).

== Common quotas ==
Two commonly used quotas are the Hare and Droop quotas. According to some the Hare quota is unbiased in the way it hands out seats so it is seen as more proportional than the Droop quota, which tends to be biased towards larger parties or at least kinder to large parties than the Hare quota, as a larger part of an amount consisting of a large number of votes is considered surplus and transferred under Droop than under Hare.

However, the Hare does not always allocate a majority of seats to a party with a majority of the votes. Droop quota guarantees that a party that wins a majority of votes in a district will win a majority of the seats in the district.

=== Hare quota ===
The Hare quota (also known as the simple quota or Hamilton's quota) is the most commonly used quota for apportionments using the largest remainder method of party-list representation. It was proposed by Thomas Hare in his first STV proposals. The Hare quota is given by the expression:

$\frac{\text{votes}}{\text{seats}}$

Specifically, the Hare quota is unbiased in the number of seats it hands out. It does suffer the disadvantage that it sometimes allocates only a minority of seats to a party with a majority of votes.

In at least one proportional representation system where the largest remainder method is used, the Hare quota has been manipulated by running candidates on many small lists, allowing each list to pick up a single remainder seat. It is not clear that this is the fault of the Hare quota or in fact the election system that was used.

=== Droop quota ===
The Droop quota is used in most single transferable vote (STV) elections today and is occasionally used in elections held under the largest remainder method of party-list proportional representation (list PR). As well, it is identical to the Hagenbach-Bishoff quota, which is used to allocate seats by party in some list PR systems.

The Droop quota is given by the expression:

$\frac{\text{total votes}}{\text{total seats}+1}$ plus 1 and rounded down.

It was first proposed in 1868 by the English lawyer and mathematician Henry Richmond Droop (1831–1884), who identified it as the minimum amount of support that would not possibly be achieved by too many compared to the number of seats in a district in semiproportional voting systems such as SNTV, leading him to propose it as an alternative to the Hare quota.

While Hare quota makes it more difficult for a large party to take its full share of the seats, even denying a majority of seats in district to a party with a majority of district votes, the Droop quota does not disadvantage larger parties. Some say the Droop quota may go too far in that regard, saying it is the most-biased possible quota that can still be considered to be proportional. This is somewhat softened by the fact that the smaller the quota is (Droop is smaller than Hare), a small party requires a smaller percentage of votes to take a seat.

Today the Droop quota is used in almost all STV elections, including those in the Republic of Ireland, Malta, Australia, Northern Ireland, and India.

== Uncommon quotas ==
=== Uniform quota ===
In some implementations, a "uniform quota" is simply set by law – any candidate receiving that set number of votes is declared elected, with surplus transferred away.

This system was used in the Weimar Republic for Reichstag elections; a district received one seat for every 60,000 votes cast for a list, with the first 60,000 votes going to the first candidate on the list (as ranked by the party), the second 60,000 to the second candidate, and so on. Residual votes were transferred to the level of the electoral association. There, the remaining votes from the districts making up the association were added together; for a full 60,000 votes, there was one seat from the district list that had contributed the most residual votes. Any additional remaining votes were carried over to the national level where a party again received one seat (from the national list) per 60,000 votes.

Something like this system was used in New York City from 1937 to 1947, where seats were allocated to each borough based on voter turnout and then each candidate that surpassed set number of votes was declared elected, and enough others that came close to fill up the borough seats. (This was a simple method of conducting a biproportional apportionment.)

Under such a system, the number of representatives elected varied from election to election depending on voter turnout. Under NYC's STV, total seats on council varied: 1937 New York City Council election 26 seats, 1939 New York City Council election 21 seats, 1941 26 seats, 1943 17 seats, and 1945 23 seats.

Like when Hare and Droop quotas are used, during the use of uniform quota, seats may be allocated to candidates who do not have full quota.

== See also ==
- Quota rule
- Single transferable vote
- Proportional representation
- Largest remainders method
- Instant-runoff voting
