= Localized list =

Technique used for elections

Localized or local list systems of party-list proportional representation hold elections in small (local) electoral districts, while still maintaining proportional representation at the national level. Voting takes place in small district, but localized list rules differ from single-member districts in that each district, some or all of the seats are reserved for underrepresented parties, i.e. those that are represented less-than-proportionally in the legislature. These seats are then assigned to parties in districts in which they have received the most votes.

To ensure that each party receives a proportional share of seats relative to its share of the popular vote, the first step in ballot counting is to add up the votes going to each party either overall (at-large) or by multi-member constituencies. The results by party are then used to divide the number of seats proportionately among the different parties. The party list is composed of the candidates running in each district.

Once the number of seats won by a party is known, that party's candidates with the highest percentages of votes in their district are the ones elected, until all the seats corresponding to that party have been filled.

This system affords voters a way of voting for individual candidates. However, the system is designed to ensure proportionality, so the candidate with the highest popular vote in a single local constituency may not be elected (because his or her party-mates in other constituencies may have a higher voter share) and candidates with fewer votes can be elected (because they are the best candidates in their party's list). It is possible for more than one candidate to be elected in a single district, or for no candidate to be elected.

Localized lists are used in Italy for provincial elections and were used for Senatorial elections from 1948 to 2001. They were also used in a Mixed-member proportional representation variant in the Landtag of Baden-Württemberg until an electoral reform in 2022. (the first-place candidate in each district is guaranteed a seat, and each constituency has more seats than it has districts to ensure proportionality)

== Examples ==
How this mechanism operates can best be understood with some numerical examples. The examples below are for a hypothetical four-member constituency containing four equal-sized districts. The constituency is represented by four elected members, although elected members are understood to represent the whole constituency, not just the individual districts. The two examples are virtually identical, except that in the second example, the number of votes secured by the Blue Party is slightly higher in District 4 relative to District 3. Seat allocation by party is determined using the Hare quota, largest remainder method.

=== Example 1 ===
District 1	District 2	District 3	District 4	Party
John (Red), 600	Charles (Red), 210	Hughes (Red), 470	Anne (Red), 390	1670
Carew (Yellow), 200	James (Yellow), 350	Duncan (Yellow), 180	Michael (Yellow), 160	890
Millie (Green), 50	Paul (Green), 250	Patty (Green), 60	Trevor (Green), 170	530
Andrew (Blue), 150	Ronnie (Blue), 190	Joshua (Blue), 290	Mary (Blue), 280	910
1000 voters	1000 voters	1000 voters	1000 voters	4000 voters

=== Example 2 ===
District 1	District 2	District 3	District 4
John (Reds), 600	James (Yellows), 350	Hughes (Reds), 470	Anne (Reds), 370
Carew (Yellows), 200	Paul (Greens), 250	Joshua (Blues), 290	Mary (Blues), 300
Andrew (Blues), 150	Charles (Reds), 210	Duncan (Yellows), 180	Trevor (Greens), 170
Millie (Greens), 50	Ronnie (Blues), 190	Patty (Greens), 60	Michael (Yellows), 160
1000 voters	1000 voters	1000 voters	1000 voters

Four seats must be filled. The Red Party received 1650 votes, Blues 930, Yellows 890 and Greens 530. As before, the Red Party wins two seats while the Blue and Yellow Parties win one seat each. Party candidates John, James, Hughes and Mary are elected. In this case, the front-runner, Anne, loses her race in favour of the runner-up, but again this is in principle not a problem, because Mary represents the Blue Party for the constituency as a whole and was the strongest of the Blue Party candidates.

== See also ==
- List of democracy and elections-related topics
