= Sainte-Laguë method =

Proportional-representation electoral system

The Sainte-Laguë method (French pronunciation: [sɛ̃t.la.ɡy]), also called the Webster method or the Schepers method (German pronunciation: [ˈʃeːpɐs]), is a highest averages apportionment method for allocating seats in a parliament among federal states, or among parties in a party-list proportional representation system. The Sainte-Laguë method shows a more equal seats-to-votes ratio for different sized parties among apportionment methods.

The method was first described in 1832 by American statesman and senator Daniel Webster. In 1842, the method was adopted for proportional allocation of seats in United States congressional apportionment (Act of 25 June 1842, ch 46, 5 Stat. 491). The same method was independently invented in 1910 by the French mathematician André Sainte-Laguë, and in 1980 by German physicist Hans Schepers.

It is used for party-list proportional representation in Ecuador, Germany, Indonesia, Latvia and Nepal, as well as in modified form in Norway and Sweden. It is also used as part of MMP in New Zealand.

== Motivation ==
Proportional electoral systems attempt to distribute seats in proportion to the votes for each political party, e.g. a party with 30% of votes would receive 30% of seats. Exact proportionality is not possible because only whole seats can be distributed. Different apportionment methods, of which the Sainte-Laguë method is one, exist to distribute the seats according to the votes. Different apportionment methods show different levels of proportionality, apportionment paradoxes and political fragmentation. The Sainte-Laguë method minimizes the average seats-to-votes ratio deviation and empirically shows the best proportionality behavior and more equal seats-to-votes ratio for different sized parties among apportionment methods. Among other common methods, the D'Hondt method favours large parties and coalitions over small parties. While favoring large parties reduces political fragmentation, this can be achieved with electoral thresholds as well. The Sainte-Laguë method shows fewer apportionment paradoxes compared to largest remainder methods such as the Hare quota and other highest averages methods such as d'Hondt method.

== Description ==
After all the votes have been tallied, successive quotients are calculated for each party. The formula for the quotient is

$$\text{quotient} = \frac{V}{2s+1}$$

where:

- V is the total number of votes that party received, and
- s is the number of seats that have been allocated so far to that party, initially 0 for all parties.

Whichever party has the highest quotient gets the next seat allocated, and their quotient is recalculated. The process is repeated until all seats have been allocated.

The Webster/Sainte-Laguë method does not ensure that a party receiving more than half the votes will win at least half the seats, which might not happen if a party with just over half the vote gets "rounded down" to under half the seats. It also does not ensure that a party with a minority of the vote will not win a majority of the seats, for roughly the same reason.

Often there is an electoral threshold; that is, in order to be allocated seats, a minimum percentage of votes must be gained.

=== Example ===
In this example, 230,000 voters decide the disposition of 8 seats among 4 parties. Since 8 seats are to be allocated, each party's total votes are divided by 1, then by 3, and 5 (and then, if necessary, by 7, 9, 11, 13, and so on by using the formula above) every time the number of votes is the biggest for the current round of calculation.

For comparison, the "True proportion" column shows the exact fractional numbers of seats due, calculated in proportion to the number of votes received. (For example, 100,000/230,000 × 8 = 3.48.)

round (1 seat per round)	1	2	3	4	5	6	7	Seats won (bold)
Party A (100,000 votes)	100,000 0+1	33,333 1	33,333 1+1	20,000 2	20,000 2	20,000 2+1	14,286 3	3
Party B (80,000 votes)	80,000 0	80,000 0+1	26,667 1	26,667 1	26,667 1+1	16,000 2	16,000 2+1	3
Party C (30,000 votes)	30,000 0	30,000 0	30,000 0	30,000 0+1	10,000 1	10,000 1	10,000 1	1
Party D (20,000 votes)	20,000 0	20,000 0	20,000 0	20,000 0	20,000 0	20,000 0+1	6,667 1	1

The 8 highest entries (in the current round of calculation) are marked by asterisk: from 100,000 down to 16,000; for each, the corresponding party gets a seat.

The below chart shows an easy way to perform the calculation:

Denominator	/1	/3	/5	Seats won (*)	True proportion
Party A	100,000*	33,333*	20,000*	3	3.5
Party B	80,000*	26,667*	16,000*	3	2.8
Party C	30,000*	10,000	6,000	1	1.0
Party D	20,000*	6,667	4,000	1	0.7
Total				8	8

Party	Popular vote	Party-list PR — Sainte-Laguë method	
Party	Popular vote	Number of seats	Seats %
Party A	43.5%	3	37.5%
Party B	34.8%	3	37.5%
Party C	13.0%	1	12.5%
Party D	8.7%	1	12.5%
TOTAL	100%	8	100%

In comparison, the D'Hondt method would allocate four seats to party A and no seats to party D, reflecting the D'Hondt method's overrepresentation of larger parties.

=== Modified Sainte-Laguë method ===
To reduce political fragmentation, some countries, e.g. Nepal, Norway and Sweden, change the quotient formula for parties with no seats (s = 0). These countries changed the quotient from V/1 to V/1.4, though from the general 2018 elections onwards, Sweden has been using V/1.2. That is, the modified method changes the sequence of divisors used in this method from (1, 3, 5, 7, ...) to (1.4, 3, 5, 7, ...). This makes it more difficult for parties to earn only one seat, compared to the unmodified Sainte-Laguë's method. With the modified method, such small parties do not get any seats; these seats are instead given to a larger party.

Norway further amends this system by utilizing a two-tier proportionality. The number of members to be returned from each of Norway's 19 constituencies (former counties) depends on the population and area of the county; each inhabitant counts one point, while each km^{2} counts 1.8 points. Furthermore, one seat from each constituency is allocated according to the national distribution of votes.

=== Threshold for seats ===
An election threshold can be set to reduce political fragmentation, and any list party which does not receive at least a specified percentage of list votes will not be allocated any seats, even if it received enough votes to have otherwise receive a seat. Examples of countries using the Sainte-Laguë method with a threshold are Germany and New Zealand (5%), although the threshold does not apply if a party wins at least one electorate seat in New Zealand or three electorate seats in Germany. Sweden uses a modified Sainte-Laguë method with a 4% threshold, and a 12% threshold in individual constituencies (i.e. a political party can gain representation with a minuscule representation on the national stage, if its vote share in at least one constituency exceeded 12%). Norway has a threshold of 4% to qualify for leveling seats that are allocated according to the national distribution of votes. This means that even though a party is below the threshold of 4% nationally, they can still get seats from constituencies in which they are particularly popular.

== Usage by country ==
The Webster/Sainte-Laguë method is currently used in Bosnia and Herzegovina, Ecuador, Indonesia, Iraq, Latvia, Nepal, New Zealand, Norway and Sweden.

In Germany it is used on the federal level for the Bundestag, and on the state level for the legislatures of Baden-Württemberg, Bavaria, Bremen, Hamburg, North Rhine-Westphalia, Rhineland-Palatinate, Saxony and Schleswig-Holstein. To correct for the deficiency where a party can win a majority of votes but not a majority of seats, in federal elections the law provides such a party will receive extra seats until it has a majority of one.

Some cantons in Switzerland use the Sainte-Laguë method for biproportional apportionment between electoral districts and for votes to seats allocation.

Country	Legislative body	Type of body	List type	Variation of open lists (if applicable)	Apportionment method	Electoral threshold	Constituencies	Governmental system	Notes
Bosnia and Herzegovina	House of Representatives	Lower house of national parliament	Open list		Sainte-Laguë method			Parliamentary directorial republic	
Ecuador	National Congress	Unicameral national parliament	Closed list	—	Sainte-Laguë method				
Germany	Bundestag	Lower house of national parliament	Localized list	Separate vote for candidates	Only first place candidate may win seat (but not guaranteed to)	5% or 3 constituencies, first place for independents (only in constituencies)	Constituencies (single-member)	Federal parliamentary republic	The system was recently modified to an essentially (non-mixed) closed list proportional system with a local constituency vote to eliminate the need for overhang seats. In the new system, the number of seats a party can win is capped, if they "won" more seats by plurality, not all of their winners will be elected.
Germany	Bundestag	Lower house of national parliament	Closed list	—	Sainte-Laguë method	5% or 3 constituencies, first place for independents (only in constituencies)	Federal states (Länder)	Federal parliamentary republic	The system was recently modified to an essentially (non-mixed) closed list proportional system with a local constituency vote to eliminate the need for overhang seats. In the new system, the number of seats a party can win is capped, if they "won" more seats by plurality, not all of their winners will be elected.
Indonesia	House of Representatives	Lower house of national parliament	Open list		Sainte-Laguë method	4%	3 to 10 members constituencies	Presidential system	
Iraq									
Latvia	Saeima	Unicameral national parliament	Open list		Sainte-Laguë method	5%		Parliamentary republic	
Norway	Storting	Unicameral national parliament	Closed list	—	modified Sainte-Laguë method	No de jure threshold	19 multi-member constituencies	Parliamentary system	First divisor is 1,4 instead of 1.
Norway	Storting	Unicameral national parliament	Closed list	4% for leveling seats	modified Sainte-Laguë method	One seat in each constituency is used for nationwide leveling		Parliamentary system	First divisor is 1,4 instead of 1.
Sweden	Riksdag	Unicameral national parliament	Open list	More open (5% of the party vote to override the default party-list)	Sainte-Laguë method (leveling seats)	4% nationally or 12% in a given constituency	Counties of Sweden (some counties are further subdivided)	Parliamentary system	

The Webster/Sainte-Laguë method was used in Bolivia in 1993, in Poland in 2001, and the Palestinian Legislative Council in 2006. The United Kingdom Electoral Commission has used the method from 2003 to 2013 to distribute British seats in the European Parliament to constituent countries of the United Kingdom and the English regions. The modified method was used by Denmark for distributing direct seats from 1953 to 2005

The method has been proposed by the Green Party in Ireland as a reform for use in Dáil Éireann elections, and by the United Kingdom Conservative–Liberal Democrat coalition government in 2011 as the method for calculating the distribution of seats in elections to the House of Lords, the country's upper house of parliament.

== History ==
Webster proposed the method in the United States Congress in 1832 for proportional allocation of seats in United States congressional apportionment. In 1842 the method was adopted (Act of 25 June 1842, ch 46, 5 Stat. 491). It was then replaced by Hamilton method and in 1911 the Webster method was reintroduced.

Webster and Sainte-Laguë methods should be treated as two methods with the same result, because the Webster method is used for allocating seats based on states' population, and the Sainte-Laguë based on parties' votes. Webster invented his method for legislative apportionment (allocating legislative seats to regions based on their share of the population) rather than elections (allocating legislative seats to parties based on their share of the votes) but this makes no difference to the calculations in the method.

Webster's method is defined in terms of a quota as in the largest remainder method; in this method, the quota is called a "divisor". For a given value of the divisor, the population count for each region is divided by this divisor and then rounded to give the number of legislators to allocate to that region. In order to make the total number of legislators come out equal to the target number, the divisor is adjusted to make the sum of allocated seats after being rounded give the required total.

One way to determine the correct value of the divisor would be to start with a very large divisor, so that no seats are allocated after rounding. Then the divisor may be successively decreased until one seat, two seats, three seats and finally the total number of seats are allocated. The number of allocated seats for a given region increases from s to s + 1 exactly when the divisor equals the population of the region divided by s + 1/2, so at each step the next region to get a seat will be the one with the largest value of this quotient. That means that this successive adjustment method for implementing Webster's method allocates seats in the same order to the same regions as the Sainte-Laguë method would allocate them.

In 1980 the German physicist Hans Schepers, at the time Head of the Data Processing Group of the German Bundestag, suggested that the distribution of seats according to d'Hondt be modified to avoid putting smaller parties at a disadvantage. German media started using the term Schepers Method and later German literature usually calls it Sainte-Laguë/Schepers.

== Properties ==
When apportioning seats in proportional representation, it is particularly important to avoid bias between large parties and small parties to avoid strategic voting. André Sainte-Laguë showed theoretically that the Sainte-Laguë method shows the lowest average bias in apportionment, confirmed by different theoretical and empirical ways. The European Parliament (Representation) Act 2003 stipulates each region must be allocated at least 3 seats and that the ratio of electors to seats is as nearly as possible the same for each, the Commission found the Sainte-Laguë method produced the smallest standard deviation when compared to the D'Hondt method and Hare quota.

=== Proportionality under Sainte-Laguë method ===
The seats-to-votes ratio $a_i$ for a political party $i$ is the ratio between the fraction of seats $s_i$ and the fraction of votes $v_i$ for that party:

$$a_i = \frac{s_i}{v_i}$$

The Sainte-Laguë method approximates proportionality by optimizing the seats-to-votes ratio among all parties $i$ with the least squares approach. First, the difference between the seats-to-votes ratio for a party and the ideal seats-to-votes ratio is calculated and squared to obtain the error for the party $i$. To achieve equal representation of each voter, the ideal ratio of seats share to votes share is $1$.

$$\text{error}_i = (a_i-a_\text{ideal})^2=\left(\frac{s_i}{v_i}-1\right)^2$$

Second, the error for each party is weighted according to the vote share of each party to represent each voter equally. In the last step, the errors for each party are summed up. This error is identical to the Sainte-Laguë Index.

$$\text{error} = \sum_i v_i\text{error}_i=\sum_i {v_i\left(\frac{s_i}{v_i}-1\right)^2}$$

It was shown that this error is minimized by the Sainte-Laguë method.

== Comparison to other methods ==
The method belongs to the class of highest-averages methods. It is similar to the Jefferson/D'Hondt method, but uses different divisors. The Jefferson/D'Hondt method favors larger parties while the Webster/Sainte-Laguë method does not. The Webster/Sainte-Laguë method is generally seen as more proportional, but risks an outcome where a party with more than half the votes can win fewer than half the seats.

When there are two parties, the Webster method is the unique divisor method which is identical to the Hamilton method.

== See also ==
- Hagenbach-Bischoff quota
