= Quota rule =

Rule in math and political science

In mathematics and political science, the quota rule describes a desired property of proportional apportionment methods. It says that the number of seats allocated to a party should be equal to their entitlement plus or minus one. (Note: The entitlement for a party is sometimes called their seat quota, leading to the term "quota rule"; such seat quotas should not be confused with the unrelated concept of an electoral quota.) The ideal number of seats for a party, called their seat entitlement, is calculated by multiplying each party's share of the vote by the total number of seats. Equivalently, it is equal to the number of votes divided by the Hare quota. For example, if a party receives 10.56% of the vote, and there are 100 seats in a parliament, the quota rule says that when all seats are allotted, the party may get either 10 or 11 seats. The most common apportionment methods (the highest averages methods) violate the quota rule in situations where upholding it would cause a population paradox, although unbiased apportionment rules like Webster's method do so only rarely.

== Mathematics ==
The entitlement for a party (the number of seats the party would ideally get) is:

$$\frac{\text{Votes}_\text{party}}{\#\text{Votes}} \cdot \#\text{Seats}$$

The lower frame is then the entitlement rounded down to the nearest integer while the upper frame is the entitlement rounded up. The frame rule states that the only two allocations that a party can receive should be either the lower or upper frame. If at any time an allocation gives a party a greater or lesser number of seats than the upper or lower frame, that allocation (and by extension, the method used to allocate it) is said to be in violation of the quota rule.

=== Example ===
If there are 5 available seats in the council of a club with 300 members, and party A has 106 members, then the entitlement for party A is $\frac {106} {300} \cdot 5 \approx 1.8$. The lower frame for party A is 1, because 1.8 rounded down equal 1. The upper frame, 1.8 rounded up, is 2. Therefore, the quota rule states that the only two allocations allowed for party A are 1 or 2 seats on the council. If there is a second party, B, that has 137 members, then the quota rule states that party B gets $\frac {137} {300} \cdot 5 \approx 2.3$, rounded up and down equals either 2 or 3 seats. Finally, a party C with the remaining 57 members of the club has a entitlement of $\frac {57} {300} \cdot 5 \approx 0.95$, which means its allocated seats should be either 0 or 1. In all cases, the method for actually allocating the seats determines whether an allocation violates the quota rule, which in this case would mean giving party A any seats other than 1 or 2, giving party B any other than 2 or 3, or giving party C any other than 0 or 1 seat.

=== Relation to apportionment paradoxes ===
The Balinski–Young theorem proved in 1980 that if an apportionment method satisfies the quota rule, it must fail to satisfy some apportionment paradox. For instance, although largest remainder method satisfies the quota rule, it violates the Alabama paradox and the population paradox. The theorem itself is broken up into several different proofs that cover a wide number of circumstances.

Specifically, there are two main statements that apply to the quota rule:

- Any method that follows the quota rule must fail the population paradox.
- Any method that is free of the population paradox must fail the quota rule for some circumstances.

== Use in apportionment methods ==
Different methods for allocating seats may or may not satisfy the quota rule. While many methods do violate the quota rule, it is sometimes preferable to violate the rule very rarely than to violate some other apportionment paradox; some sophisticated methods violate the rule so rarely that it has not ever happened in a real apportionment, while some methods that never violate the quota rule violate other paradoxes in much more serious fashions.

The largest remainder method does satisfy the quota rule. The method works by assigning each party its seat quota, rounded down. Then, the surplus seats are given to the party with the largest fractional part, until there are no more surplus seats. Because it is impossible to give more than one surplus seat to a party, every party will always be equal to its lower or upper frame.

The D'Hondt method, also known as the Jefferson method sometimes violates the quota rule by allocating more seats than the upper frame allowed. Since Jefferson was the first method used for Congressional apportionment in the United States, this violation led to a substantial problem where larger states often received more representatives than smaller states, which was not corrected until Webster's method was implemented in 1842. Although Webster's method can in theory violate the quota rule, such occurrences are extremely rare.
