= Joseph Adna Hill =

American statistician

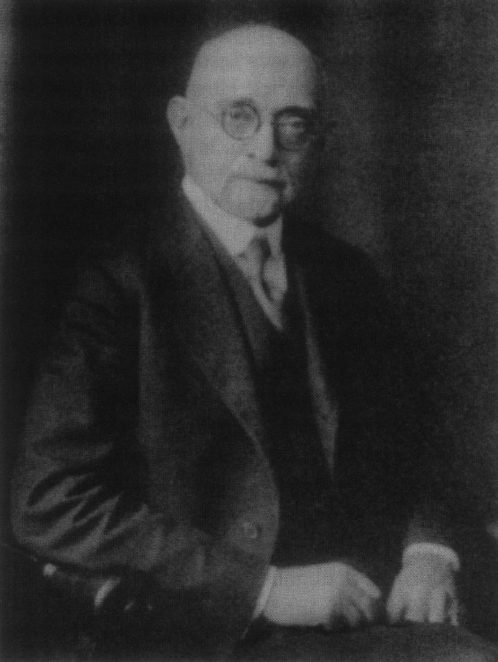
Hill as assistant director of the Census in 1921

Joseph Adna Hill (1860–1938) was an American statistician.

== Biography ==
Joseph Adna Hill was born at Stewartstown, New Hampshire on May 5, 1860. He was descended from "an elite, old-line New England family," and attended many well-regarded educational institutions. After graduating from Phillips Exeter, he attended Harvard University, graduating in 1885, and completed his graduate studies at the University of Halle (PhD) in 1892. He published The English Income Tax with Special Reference to Administration and Method of Assessment (1899).

In 1899 he took on statistical work for the United States Census Bureau, of which he became chief statistician in 1909. In this connection he had charge of census reports on child labor, illiteracy, marriage and divorce, women at work, and a report for the Immigration Commission on occupations of immigrants. He was the author of many census reports on child labor, the insane, divorce, and kindred subjects. Hill was particularly interested in race and nationality and added questions and categories to the census in both 1910 and 1920 that would record more detailed information on those subjects, among them, returning to use the racial designation of "mulatto" that had been removed from the 1900 census. He was appointed Assistant Director of the Census in 1921.

Although revised by Edward Vermilye Huntington, Hill is credited with the conception of the Method of Equal Proportions, or Huntington–Hill method of apportionment of seats in the U.S. House of Representatives to the states, as a function of their populations determined in the U.S. Census. This mathematical algorithm has been used in the U.S. since 1941 and is currently the method used.

He died from a heart attack at his home in Washington, D.C., on December 12, 1938.
