= Seat bias =

Metric for fairness of apportionment methods

Seat bias is a property describing methods of apportionment. These are methods used to allocate seats in a parliament among federal states or among political parties. A method is biased if it systematically favors small parties over large parties, or vice versa. There are several mathematical measures of bias, which can disagree slightly, but all measures broadly agree that rules based on Droop's quota or Jefferson's method are strongly biased in favor of large parties, while rules based on Webster's method, Hill's method, or Hare's quota have low levels of bias, with the differences being sufficiently small that different definitions of bias produce different results.

== Notation ==
There is a positive integer $h$ (=house size), representing the total number of seats to allocate. There is a positive integer $n$ representing the number of parties to which seats should be allocated. There is a vector of fractions $(t_1,\ldots,t_n)$ with $\sum_{i=1}^n t_i = 1$, representing entitlements, that is, the fraction of seats to which some party $i$ is entitled (out of a total of $h$). This is usually the fraction of votes the party has won in the elections.

The goal is to find an apportionment method is a vector of integers $a_1,\ldots,a_n$ with $\sum_{i=1}^n a_i = h$, called an apportionment of $h$, where $a_i$ is the number of seats allocated to party i.

An apportionment method is a multi-valued function $M(\mathbf{t},h)$, which takes as input a vector of entitlements and a house-size, and returns as output an apportionment of $h$.

== Majorization order ==
We say that an apportionment method $M'$ favors small parties more than $M$ if, for every t and h, and for every $\mathbf{a'}\in M'(\mathbf{t},h)$ and $\mathbf{a}\in M(\mathbf{t},h)$, $t_i < t_j$ implies either $a_i'\geq a_i$ or $a_j'\leq a_j$.

If $M$ and $M'$ are two divisor methods with divisor functions $d$ and $d'$, and $d'(a)/d'(b) > d(a)/d(b)$ whenever $a > b$, then $M'$ favors small agents more than $M$.

This fact can be expressed using the majorization ordering on vectors. A vector a majorizes another vector b if for all k, the k largest parties receive in a at least as many seats as they receive in b. An apportionment method $M$ majorizes another method $M'$, if for any house-size and entitlement-vector, $M(\mathbf{t},h)$ majorizes $M'(\mathbf{t},h)$. If $M$ and $M'$ are two divisor methods with divisor functions $d$ and $d'$, and $d'(a)/d'(b) > d(a)/d(b)$ whenever $a > b$, then $M'$ majorizes $M$. Therefore, Adams' method is majorized by Dean's, which is majorized by Hill's, which is majorized by Webster's, which is majorized by Jefferson's.

The shifted-quota methods (largest-remainders) with quota $q_i = t_i\cdot (h+s)$ are also ordered by majorization, where methods with smaller s are majorized by methods with larger s.

== Averaging over all house sizes ==
To measure the bias of a certain apportionment method M, one can check, for each pair of entitlements $t_1, t_2$, the set of all possible apportionments yielded by M, for all possible house sizes. Theoretically, the number of possible house sizes is infinite, but since $t_1, t_2$ are usually rational numbers, it is sufficient to check the house sizes up to the product of their denominators. For each house size, one can check whether $a_1/t_1 > a_2 / t_2$ or $a_1/t_1 < a_2 / t_2$. If the number of house-sizes for which $a_1/t_1 > a_2 / t_2$ equals the number of house-sizes for which $a_1/t_1 < a_2 / t_2$, then the method is unbiased. The only unbiased method, by this definition, is Webster's method.

== Averaging over all entitlement-pairs ==
One can also check, for each pair of possible allocations $a_1, a_2$, the set of all entitlement-pairs $t_1, t_2$ for which the method M yields the allocations $a_1, a_2$ (for $h = a_1 + a_2$). Assuming the entitlements are distributed uniformly at random, one can compute the probability that M favors state 1 vs. the probability that it favors state 2. For example, the probability that a state receiving 2 seats is favored over a state receiving 4 seats is 75% for Adams, 63.5% for Dean, 57% for Hill, 50% for Webster, and 25% for Jefferson. The unique proportional divisor method for which this probability is always 50% is Webster. There are other divisor methods yielding a probability of 50%, but they do not satisfy the criterion of proportionality as defined in the "Basic requirements" section above. The same result holds if, instead of checking pairs of agents, we check pairs of groups of agents.

== Averaging over all entitlement-vectors ==
One can also check, for each vector of entitlements (each point in the standard simplex), what is the seat bias of the agent with the k-th highest entitlement. Averaging this number over the entire standard simplex gives a seat bias formula.

=== Stationary divisor methods ===
For each stationary divisor method, i.e. one where $a$ seats correspond to a divisor $d(a) = a+r$, and electoral threshold $t$:

$\text{MeanBias}(r, k, t) = (r-1/2)\cdot\left(\sum_{i=k}^n(1/i) -1\right)\cdot(1-n t)$

In particular, Webster's method is the only unbiased one in this family. The formula is applicable when the house size is sufficiently large, particularly, when $h\geq 2n$. When the threshold is negligible, the third term can be ignored. Then, the sum of mean biases is:

$\sum_{k=1}^n \text{MeanBias}(r, k, 0) \approx (r-1/2)\cdot (n/e-1)$, when the approximation is valid for $n\geq 5$.

Since the mean bias favors large parties when $r>1/2$, there is an incentive for small parties to form party alliances (=coalitions). Such alliances can tip the bias in their favor. The seat-bias formula can be extended to settings with such alliances.

=== For shifted-quota methods ===
For each shifted-quota method (largest-remainders method) with quota $q_i = t_i\cdot (h+s)$, when entitlement vectors are drawn uniformly at random from the standard simplex,

$\text{MeanBias}(s, k, t) = \frac{s}{n}\cdot\left(\sum_{i=k}^n(1/i) -1\right)\cdot(1-n t)$

In particular, Hamilton's method is the only unbiased one in this family.

== Empirical data ==
Using United States census data, Balinski and Young argued Webster's method is the least median-biased estimator for comparing pairs of states, followed closely by the Huntington–Hill method. However, researchers have found that under other definitions or metrics for bias, the Huntington–Hill method can also be described as least biased.
