= Apportionment paradox =

Pathological behavior by an apportionment rule

An apportionment paradox is a situation where an apportionment—a rule for dividing discrete objects according to some proportional relationship—produces results that violate notions of common sense or fairness.

Certain quantities, like milk, can be divided in any proportion whatsoever; others, such as horses, cannot—only whole numbers will do. In the latter case, there is an inherent tension between the desire to obey the rule of proportion as closely as possible and the constraint restricting the size of each portion to discrete values.

Several paradoxes related to apportionment and fair division have been identified. In some cases, simple adjustments to an apportionment methodology can resolve observed paradoxes. However, as shown by the Balinski–Young theorem, it is not always possible to provide a perfectly fair resolution that satisfies all competing fairness criteria.

== History ==
An example of the apportionment paradox known as "the Alabama paradox" was discovered in the context of United States congressional apportionment in 1880, when census calculations found that if the total number of seats in the House of Representatives were hypothetically increased, this would decrease Alabama's seats from 8 to 7. An actual impact was observed in 1900, when Virginia lost a seat to Maine, even though Virginia's population was growing more rapidly: this is an example of the population paradox. In 1907, when Oklahoma became a state, New York lost a seat to Maine, thus the name "the new state paradox".

The method for apportionment used during this period, originally put forth by Alexander Hamilton, but vetoed by George Washington and not adopted until 1852, was as follows:

- First, the fair share of each state is computed, i.e. the proportional share of seats that each state would get if fractional values were allowed.
- Second, each state receives as many seats as the whole number portion of its fair share.
- Third, any state whose fair share is less than one receives one seat, regardless of population, as required by the United States Constitution.
- Fourth, any remaining seats are distributed, one each, to the states whose fair shares have the highest fractional parts.

The Hamilton method replaced a rounding method proposed by Thomas Jefferson, and was itself replaced by the Huntington–Hill method in 1941.

== Examples of paradoxes ==
=== Alabama paradox ===
The Alabama paradox was the first of the apportionment paradoxes to be discovered. The US House of Representatives is constitutionally required to allocate seats based on population counts, which are required every 10 years. The size of the House is set by statute.

After the 1880 census, C. W. Seaton, chief clerk of the United States Census Bureau, computed apportionments for all House sizes between 275 and 350, and discovered that Alabama would get eight seats with a House size of 299 but only seven with a House size of 300. In general the term Alabama paradox refers to any apportionment scenario where increasing the total number of items would decrease one of the shares. A similar exercise by the Census Bureau after the 1900 census computed apportionments for all House sizes between 350 and 400: Colorado would have received three seats in all cases, except with a House size of 357, in which case it would have received two.

The following is a simplified example (following the largest remainder method) with three states and 10 seats and 11 seats.

		With 10 seats		With 11 seats	
State	Population	Fair share	Seats	Fair share	Seats
A	6	4.286	4	4.714	5
B	6	4.286	4	4.714	5
C	2	1.429	2	1.571	1

Observe that state C's share decreases from 2 to 1 with the added seat.

In this example of a 10% increase in the number of seats, each state's share increases by 10%. However, increasing the number of seats by a fixed % increases the fair share more for larger numbers (i.e., large states more than small states). In particular, large A and B had their fair share increase faster than small C. Therefore, the fractional parts for A and B increased faster than those for C. In fact, they overtook C's fraction, causing C to lose its seat, since the Hamilton method allocates according to which states have the largest fractional remainder.

The Alabama paradox gave rise to the axiom known as house monotonicity, which says that, when the house size increases, the allocations of all states should weakly increase.

=== Population paradox ===
The population paradox is a counterintuitive result of some procedures for apportionment. When two states have populations increasing at different rates, a small state with rapid growth can lose a legislative seat to a big state with slower growth.

Some of the earlier Congressional apportionment methods, such as Hamilton, could exhibit the population paradox. In 1900, Virginia lost a seat to Maine, even though Virginia's population was growing more rapidly. However, divisor methods such as the current method do not.

=== New states paradox ===
The New State paradox is a property of all largest remainder methods, in which the entry of a new state (or party) causes a change in the apportionment between two completely unrelated parties, despite not changing their combined apportionment.

The paradox was first noticed in 1907, when Oklahoma became a state. It was decided it should be given its entitled fair share of 5 seats and the House expanded by 5 seats as well, with the intent of maintaining all other state delegations fixed. However, when the apportionment was recalculated, it was discovered these were not fixed: New York had lost a seat, while Maine had gained one. This resulted in a crisis of confidence in the apportionment rules procedure as well as a bitter debate within the House, as it was unclear which of these apportionments—the one calculated from scratch, or the one calculated after the previous Census—should be considered the "correct" one.

The New State paradox gave rise to the axiom known as coherence, which says that, whenever an apportionment rule is applied to a subset of the states, with the subset of seats allocated to them, the outcome should be the same as in the overall solution for all states. This can be considered the analog of independence of spoilers seen in other areas of social choice: that one part of the apportionment (the assignment of seats between A and B) should not depend on another, unrelated part of the apportionment (the assignment of seats between C and D).

== Balinski–Young theorem ==
In 1982, two mathematicians, Michel Balinski and Peyton Young, proved that any method of apportionment that does not violate the quota rule will result in paradoxes whenever there are four or more parties (or states, regions, etc.). More precisely, their theorem states that there is no apportionment system that has the following properties for more than three parties (as the example we take the division of seats between parties in a system of proportional representation):

- It avoids violations of the quota rule: Each of the parties gets one of the two numbers closest to its fair share of seats. For example, if a party's fair share is 7.34 seats, it must get either 7 or 8 seats to avoid a violation; any other number will violate the rule.
- It does not have the population paradox: If party A gets more votes and party B gets fewer votes, no seat will be transferred from A to B.

It is of note that any method of apportionment free of the Population Paradox will always be free of Alabama Paradox. The converse is not true, however. Webster's method can be free of incoherence and maintain quota when there are three parties. All sensible methods satisfy both criteria in the trivial two-party case.

They show a proof of impossibility: apportionment methods may have a subset of these properties, but cannot have all of them:

- A method may be free of both the Alabama paradox and the population paradox. These methods are divisor methods, and Huntington–Hill, the method currently used to apportion House of Representatives seats, is one of them. However, these methods will necessarily fail to always follow quota in other circumstances.
- No method may always follow quota and be free of the population paradox.

The division of seats in an election is a prominent cultural concern. In 1876, the United States presidential election turned on the method by which the remaining fraction was calculated. Rutherford Hayes received 185 electoral college votes, and Samuel Tilden received 184. Tilden won the popular vote. With a different rounding method the final electoral college tally would have reversed. However, many mathematically analogous situations arise in which quantities are to be divided into discrete equal chunks. The Balinski–Young theorem applies in these situations: it indicates that although very reasonable approximations can be made, there is no mathematically rigorous way to reconcile the small remaining fraction while complying with all the competing fairness elements. In general, the response from mathematicians has been to abandon the quota rule as the less-important property, accepting that apportionment errors may sometimes slightly exceed one seat.

A method may follow quota and be free of the Alabama paradox. Balinski and Young constructed a method that does so, although it is not in common political use.
