= Signpost sequence =

Generalized rounding rule

In mathematics and apportionment theory, a signpost sequence is a sequence of real numbers, called signposts, used in defining generalized rounding rules. A signpost sequence defines a set of signposts that mark the boundaries between neighboring whole numbers: a real number less than the signpost is rounded down, while numbers greater than the signpost are rounded up.

Signposts allow for a more general concept of rounding than the usual one. For example, the signposts of the rounding rule "always round down" (truncation) are given by the signpost sequence $s_0 = 1, s_1 = 2, s_2 = 3 \dots$

== Formal definition ==
Mathematically, a signpost sequence is a localized sequence, meaning the $n$th signpost lies in the $n$th interval with integer endpoints: $s_n \in (n, n+1]$ for all $n$. This allows us to define a general rounding function using the floor function:

$$\operatorname{round}(x) = \begin{cases}
\lfloor x \rfloor       & x < s(\lfloor x \rfloor) \\
\lfloor x \rfloor + 1   & x > s(\lfloor x \rfloor)
\end{cases}$$

Where exact equality can be handled with any tie-breaking rule, most often by rounding to the nearest even.

== Applications ==
In the context of apportionment theory, signpost sequences are used in defining highest averages methods, a set of algorithms designed to achieve equal representation between different groups.
