= 1880 United States census =

10th US national census

- June 1, 1880
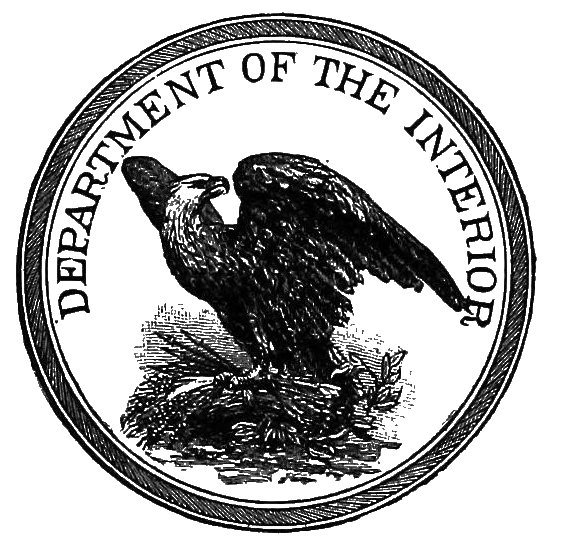
- Seal of the Department of the Interior

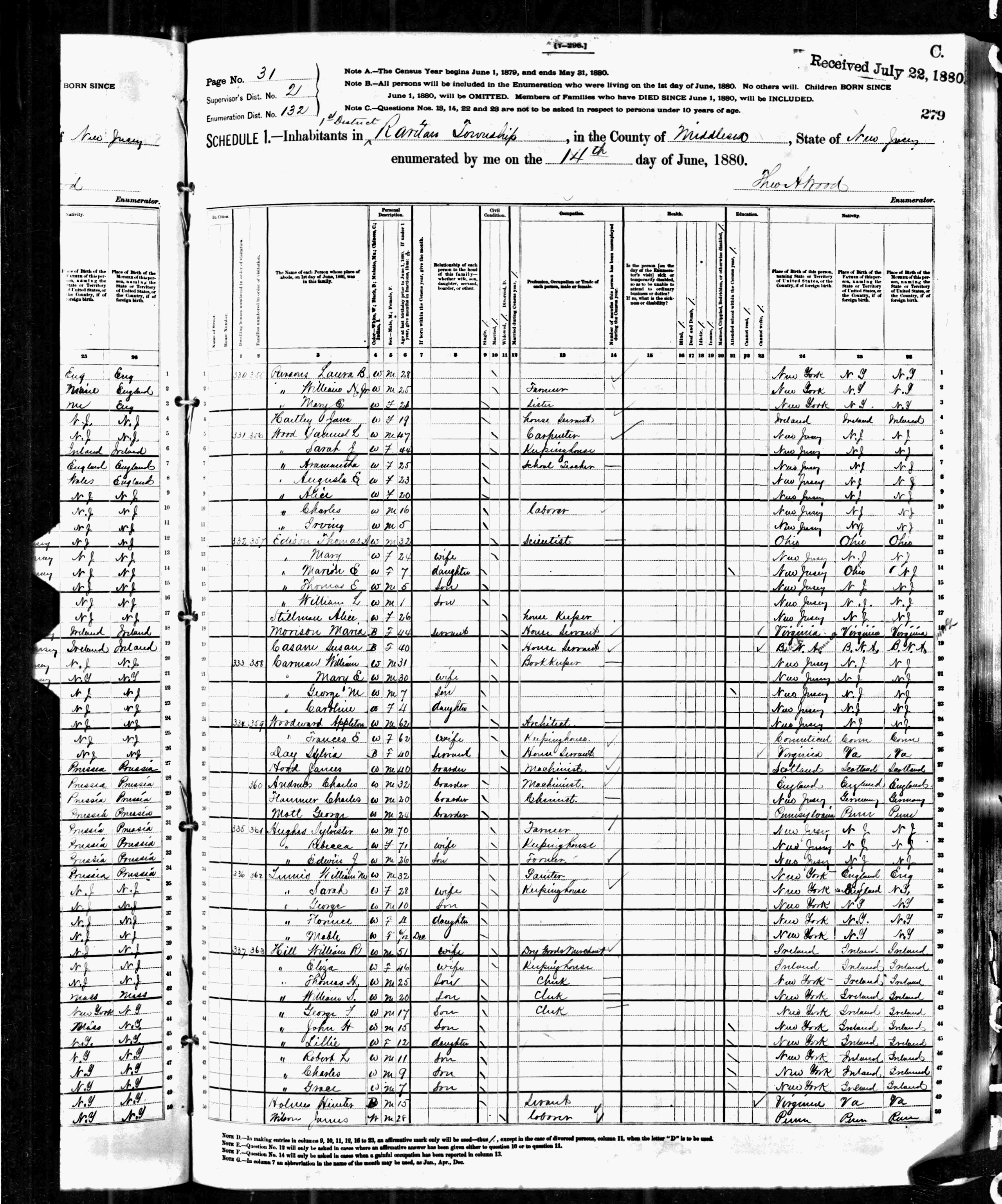
- Thomas Edison in the 1880 U.S. census

General information
- Country: United States
- Authority: Census Office

Results
- Total population: 50,189,209 (▲30.2%)
- Most populous state: New York; 5,082,871
- Least populous state: Nevada; 62,266

The 1880 United States census, conducted by the Census Office during June 1880, was the tenth United States census. It was the first time that women were permitted to be enumerators. The Superintendent of the Census was Francis Amasa Walker. This was the first census in which a city—New York City—recorded a population of over one million, and the first census in which the 20 most populated cities all recorded over 100,000 residents.

== Data collected ==
Five schedules were authorized by the 1880 Census Act, four of which were filled out by the enumerators:

- Schedule 1 (Population), which was similar to that used for the previous census, with a few exceptions.
- Schedule 2 (Mortality), which used the same inquiries as in 1870, and added inquiries to record marital status, birthplace of parents, length of residence in the United States or territory, and name of place where the disease was contracted, if other than place of death.
- Schedule 3 (Agriculture), which greatly expanded inquiries concerning various crops (including acreage for principal crop), and included questions on farm tenure, weeks of hired labor, annual cost for fence building and repair, fertilizer purchases, and the number of livestock.
- Schedule 5 (Manufacturing), which expanded to include information on the greatest number of hands employed at any time during the year, the number of hours in the ordinary work day from May to November and November to May, the average daily wages paid to skilled mechanics and laborers, months of full-and part-time operation, and machinery used.

Schedule 4 (Social statistics) was the responsibility of experts and special agents, rather than the enumerators. The majority of the data came from correspondence with officials of institutions providing care and treatment of certain members of the population. Experts and special agents also were employed to collect data on valuation, taxation, and indebtedness; religion and libraries; colleges, academies, and schools; newspapers and periodicals, and wages.

Special agents were also charged with collecting data on specific industries throughout the country, and included the manufactures of iron and steel; cotton, woolen, and worsted goods; silk and silk goods; chemical products and salt; coke and glass; shipbuilding; and all aspects of fisheries and mining, including the production of coal and petroleum.

Full documentation for the 1880 population census, including census forms and enumerator instructions, is available from the Integrated Public Use Microdata Series, which contains microdata.

== Data availability ==
The original census enumeration sheets were microfilmed by the Census Bureau; after which the original sheets were transferred to various state archives, libraries, or universities. The microfilmed census is available in rolls from the National Archives and Records Administration. Several organizations also host images of the microfilmed census online, along which digital indices.

Microdata from the 1880 population census are freely available through the Integrated Public Use Microdata Series. Aggregate data for small areas, together with compatible cartographic boundary files, can be downloaded from the National Historical Geographic Information System.

== Results ==
The 1880 census determined the resident population of the United States to be 50,189,209, an increase of 30.2 percent over the 38,555,983 persons enumerated during the 1870 census. The mean center of United States population for 1880 was in Boone County, Kentucky.

The results from the census were used to determine the apportionment for the 48th, 49th, 50th, 51st, and 52nd sessions of the United States Congress.

The processing of the 1880 census data took so long (eight years) that the Census Bureau contracted Herman Hollerith to design and build a tabulating machine to be used for the next census. The 1880 census also led to the discovery of the Alabama paradox.

Source: Table I, Population of the United States, by States and Territories

Rank	State	Population
01	New York	5,082,871
02	Pennsylvania	4,282,891
03	Ohio	3,198,062
04	Illinois	3,077,871
05	Missouri	2,168,380
06	Indiana	1,978,301
07	Massachusetts	1,783,085
08	Kentucky	1,648,690
09	Michigan	1,636,937
10	Iowa	1,624,615
11	Texas	1,591,749
12	Tennessee	1,542,359
13	Georgia	1,542,180
14	Virginia	1,512,565
15	North Carolina	1,399,750
16	Wisconsin	1,315,497
17	Alabama	1,262,505
18	Mississippi	1,131,597
19	New Jersey	1,131,116
20	Kansas	996,096
21	South Carolina	995,577
22	Louisiana	939,946
23	Maryland	934,943
24	California	864,694
25	Arkansas	802,525
26	Minnesota	780,773
27	Maine	648,936
28	Connecticut	622,700
29	West Virginia	618,457
30	Nebraska	452,402
31	New Hampshire	346,991
32	Vermont	332,286
33	Rhode Island	276,531
34	Florida	269,493
35	Colorado	194,327
X	District of Columbia	177,624
36	Oregon	174,768
37	Delaware	146,608
X	Utah	143,963
X	New Mexico	119,565
X	South Dakota	98,268
X	Washington	75,116
38	Nevada	62,266
X	Arizona	40,440
X	Montana	39,159
X	North Dakota	36,909
X	Idaho	32,610
X	Wyoming	20,789

== City rankings ==
Rank	City	State	Population	Region (2016)
01	New York	New York	1,206,299	Northeast
02	Philadelphia	Pennsylvania	847,170	Northeast
03	Brooklyn	New York	566,663	Northeast
04	Chicago	Illinois	503,185	Midwest
05	Boston	Massachusetts	362,839	Northeast
06	St. Louis	Missouri	350,518	Midwest
07	Baltimore	Maryland	332,313	South
08	Cincinnati	Ohio	255,139	Midwest
09	San Francisco	California	233,959	West
10	New Orleans	Louisiana	216,090	South
11	Cleveland	Ohio	160,146	Midwest
12	Pittsburgh	Pennsylvania	156,389	Northeast
13	Buffalo	New York	155,134	Northeast
14	Washington	District of Columbia	147,293	South
15	Newark	New Jersey	136,508	Northeast
16	Louisville	Kentucky	123,758	South
17	Jersey City	New Jersey	120,722	Northeast
18	Detroit	Michigan	116,340	Midwest
19	Milwaukee	Wisconsin	115,587	Midwest
20	Providence	Rhode Island	104,857	Northeast
21	Albany	New York	90,758	Northeast
22	Rochester	New York	89,366	Northeast
23	Allegheny	Pennsylvania	78,682	Northeast
24	Indianapolis	Indiana	75,056	Midwest
25	Richmond	Virginia	63,600	South
26	New Haven	Connecticut	62,882	Northeast
27	Lowell	Massachusetts	59,475	Northeast
28	Worcester	Massachusetts	58,291	Northeast
29	Troy	New York	56,747	Northeast
30	Kansas City	Missouri	55,785	Midwest
31	Cambridge	Massachusetts	52,669	Northeast
32	Syracuse	New York	51,792	Northeast
33	Columbus	Ohio	51,647	Midwest
34	Paterson	New Jersey	51,031	Northeast
35	Toledo	Ohio	50,137	Midwest
36	Charleston	South Carolina	49,984	South
37	Fall River	Massachusetts	48,961	Northeast
38	Minneapolis	Minnesota	46,887	Midwest
39	Scranton	Pennsylvania	45,850	Northeast
40	Nashville	Tennessee	43,350	South
41	Reading	Pennsylvania	43,278	Northeast
42	Wilmington	Delaware	42,478	South
43	Hartford	Connecticut	42,015	Northeast
44	Camden	New Jersey	41,659	Northeast
45	Saint Paul	Minnesota	41,473	Midwest
46	Lawrence	Massachusetts	39,151	Northeast
47	Dayton	Ohio	38,678	Midwest
48	Lynn	Massachusetts	38,274	Northeast
49	Atlanta	Georgia	37,409	South
50	Denver	Colorado	35,629	West
51	Oakland	California	34,555	West
52	Utica	New York	33,914	Northeast
53	Portland	Maine	33,810	Northeast
54	Memphis	Tennessee	33,592	South
55	Springfield	Massachusetts	33,340	Northeast
56	Manchester	New Hampshire	32,630	Northeast
57	St. Joseph	Missouri	32,431	Midwest
58	Grand Rapids	Michigan	32,016	Midwest
59	Hoboken	New Jersey	30,999	Northeast
60	Harrisburg	Pennsylvania	30,762	Northeast
61	Wheeling	West Virginia	30,737	South
62	Savannah	Georgia	30,709	South
63	Omaha	Nebraska	30,518	Midwest
64	Trenton	New Jersey	29,910	Northeast
65	Covington	Kentucky	29,720	South
66	Evansville	Indiana	29,280	Midwest
67	Peoria	Illinois	29,259	Midwest
68	Mobile	Alabama	29,132	South
69	Elizabeth	New Jersey	28,229	Northeast
70	Erie	Pennsylvania	27,737	Northeast
71	Bridgeport	Connecticut	27,643	Northeast
72	Salem	Massachusetts	27,563	Northeast
73	Quincy	Illinois	27,268	Midwest
74	Fort Wayne	Indiana	26,880	Midwest
75	New Bedford	Massachusetts	26,845	Northeast
76	Terre Haute	Indiana	26,042	Midwest
77	Lancaster	Pennsylvania	25,769	Northeast
78	Somerville	Massachusetts	24,933	Northeast
79	Wilkes-Barre	Pennsylvania	23,339	Northeast
80	Des Moines	Iowa	22,408	Midwest
81	Dubuque	Iowa	22,254	Midwest
82	Galveston	Texas	22,248	South
83	Norfolk	Virginia	21,966	South
84	Auburn	New York	21,924	Northeast
85	Holyoke	Massachusetts	21,915	Northeast
86	Augusta	Georgia	21,891	South
87	Davenport	Iowa	21,831	Midwest
88	Chelsea	Massachusetts	21,782	Northeast
89	Petersburg	Virginia	21,656	South
90	Sacramento	California	21,420	West
91	Taunton	Massachusetts	21,213	Northeast
92	Oswego	New York	21,116	Northeast
93	Salt Lake City	Utah	20,768	West
94	Springfield	Ohio	20,730	Midwest
95	Bay City	Michigan	20,693	Midwest
96	San Antonio	Texas	20,550	South
97	Elmira	New York	20,541	Northeast
98	Newport	Kentucky	20,433	South
99	Poughkeepsie	New York	20,207	Northeast
100	Springfield	Illinois	19,743	Midwest
