= Edward Vermilye Huntington =

American mathematician

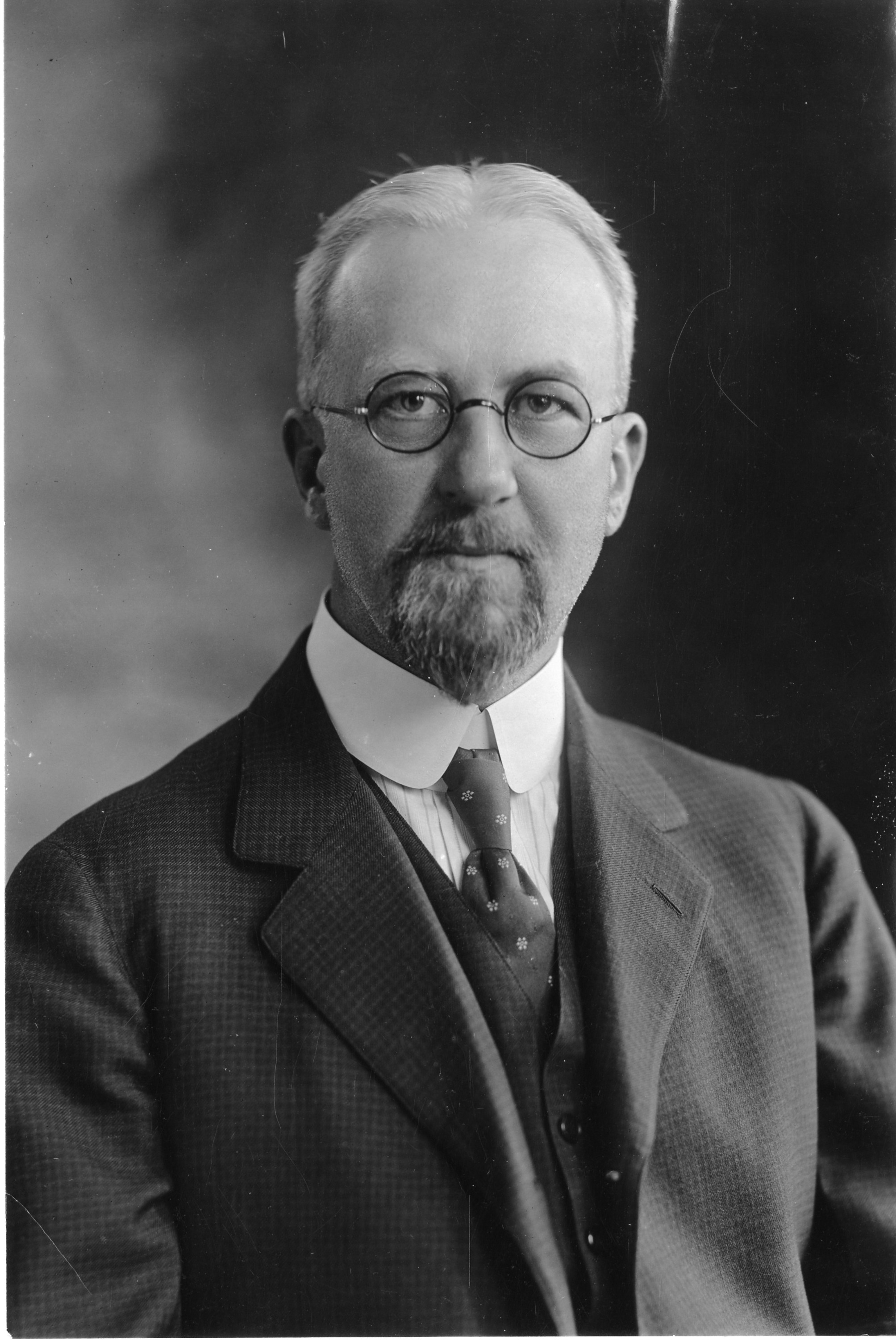
- Born: April 26, 1874; Clinton, New York, U.S.
- Died: November 25, 1952 (aged 78); Cambridge, Massachusetts, U.S.
- Education: Harvard University (BA, MA); University of Strasbourg (PhD)
- Employer(s): Williams College; Harvard University

Edward Vermilye Huntington (April 26, 1874 – November 25, 1952) was an American mathematician.

== Biography ==
Huntington was awarded the B.A. and the M.A. by Harvard University in 1895 and 1897, respectively. After two years' teaching at Williams College, he began a doctorate at the University of Strasbourg, which was awarded in 1901. He then spent his entire career at Harvard, retiring in 1941. He taught in the engineering school, becoming Professor of Mechanics in 1919. Although Huntington's research was mainly in pure mathematics, he valued teaching mathematics to engineering students. He advocated mechanical calculators and had one in his office. He had an interest in statistics, unusual for the time, and worked on statistical problems for the USA military during World War I.

Huntington's primary research interest was the foundations of mathematics. He was one of the "American postulate theorists" (according to Michael Scanlan, the expression is due to John Corcoran), American mathematicians active early in the 20th century (including E. H. Moore and Oswald Veblen) who proposed axiom sets for a variety of mathematical systems. In so doing, they helped found what is now known as metamathematics and model theory.

Huntington was perhaps the most prolific of the American postulate theorists, devising sets of axioms (which he called "postulates") for groups, abelian groups, geometry, the real number field, and complex numbers. His 1902 axiomatization of the real numbers has been characterized as "one of the first successes of abstract mathematics" and as having "filled the last gap in the foundations of Euclidean geometry". Huntington excelled at proving axioms independent of each other by finding a sequence of models, each one satisfying all but one of the axioms in a given set. His 1917 book The Continuum and Other Types of Serial Order was in its day "...a widely read introduction to Cantorian set theory" (Scanlan 1999). Yet Huntington and the other American postulate theorists played no role in the rise of axiomatic set theory then taking place in continental Europe.

In 1904, Huntington put Boolean algebra on a sound axiomatic foundation. He revisited Boolean axiomatics in 1933, proving that Boolean algebra required but a single binary operation (denoted below by infix '+') that commutes and associates, and a single unary operation, complementation, denoted by a postfix prime. The only further axiom Boolean algebra requires is:

(a '+b ')'+(a '+b)' = a,

now known as Huntington's axiom.

Revising a method from Joseph Adna Hill, Huntington is credited with the method of equal proportions or Huntington–Hill method of apportionment of seats in the U.S. House of Representatives to the states, as a function of their populations determined in the U.S. Census. This mathematical algorithm has been used in the U.S. since 1941 and is currently the method used.

In 1919, Huntington was the third President of the Mathematical Association of America, which he helped found as a charter member and its first vice-president. He was elected to the American Academy of Arts and Sciences in 1913 and the American Philosophical Society in 1933. In 1942 he was elected as a Fellow of the American Statistical Association.
