= Henry Richmond Droop =

English barrister (1832–1884)

Henry Richmond Droop (12 September 1832 – 21 March 1884) was an English barrister after whom the Droop quota is named. He also may have been the first to write down what later became known as Duverger's Law, in 1869. He authored the book "On Methods of Electing Representatives" in 1881.

He married Clara Baily (ca. 1841 – 7 September 1921) on 17 August 1872 and was the father of archaeologist John Percival Droop (1882–1963).
