= Largest remainder method =

Proportional-representation voting system

The quota or divide-and-rank methods make up a category of apportionment rules, i.e. algorithms for allocating seats in a legislative body among multiple groups (e.g. parties or federal states). The quota methods begin by calculating an entitlement (basic number of seats) for each party, by dividing their vote totals by an electoral quota (a fixed number of votes needed to win a seat, as a unit). Then leftover seats, if any, are allocated by rounding up the apportionment for some parties. These rules are typically contrasted with the more popular highest averages methods (also called divisor methods).

By far the most common quota method are the largest remainders or quota-shift methods, which assign any leftover seats to the "plurality" winners (the parties with the largest remainders, i.e. most leftover votes).

When using the Hare quota, this rule is called Hamilton's method or the Hare-Niemeyer method, and is the third-most common apportionment rule worldwide (after the d'Hondt and Sainte-Laguë highest averages methods).

Despite their intuitive definition, quota methods are generally disfavored by social choice theorists as a result of apportionment paradoxes. In particular, the largest remainder methods exhibit the no-show paradox, i.e. voting for a party can cause it to lose seats. The largest remainders methods are also vulnerable to spoiler effects and can fail resource or house monotonicity, which says that increasing the number of seats in a legislature should not cause a party to lose a seat (a situation known as an Alabama paradox).

== Method ==
The largest remainder method divides each party's vote total by a quota. Usually, quota is derived by dividing the number of valid votes cast, by the number of seats. The result for each party will consist of an integer part plus a fractional remainder. Each party is first allocated a number of seats equal to their integer. This will generally leave some remainder seats unallocated. To apportion these seats, the parties are then ranked on the basis of their fractional remainders, and the parties with the largest remainders are each allocated one additional seat until all seats have been allocated. This gives the method its name - largest remainder.

Largest remainder methods produces similar results to single transferable vote or the quota Borda system, where voters organize themselves into solid coalitions. The single transferable vote or the quota Borda system behave like the largest-remainders method when voters all behave like strict partisans (i.e. only mark preferences for candidates of one party).

== Quotas ==
There are several possible choices for the electoral quota. The choice of quota affects the properties of the corresponding largest remainder method, and particularly the seat bias. Smaller quotas allow small parties to pick up seats, while larger quotas leave behind more votes. A somewhat counterintuitive result of this is that a larger quota will always be more favorable to smaller parties. A party hoping to win multiple seats sees fewer votes captured by a single popular candidate when the quota is small.

The two most common quotas are the Hare quota and the Droop quota. The use of a particular quota with one of the largest remainder methods is often abbreviated as "LR-[quota name]", such as "LR-Droop".

The Hare (or simple) quota is defined as follows:

$$\frac{\text{total votes}}{\text{total seats}}$$

LR-Hare is sometimes called Hamilton's method, named after Alexander Hamilton, who devised the method in 1792.

The Droop quota is given by:

$$\frac{\text{total votes}}{\text{total seats}+1}$$

and is applied to elections in South Africa.

The Hare quota is more generous to less-popular parties and the Droop quota to more-popular parties. Specifically, the Hare quota is unbiased in the number of seats it hands out, and so is more proportional than the Droop quota (which tends to give more seats to larger parties). The Hare suffers the disproportionality that it sometimes allocates a minority of seats to a party with more than half the votes in a district and sometimes allocates a majority of seats to a party with less than a majority of votes

== Examples ==
The following example allocates 11 seats using the largest-remainder method by Hare quota.

Party	Votes	Entitlement	Remainder	Total seats
Yellows	47,000	5.170	0.170	5
Whites	16,000	1.760	0.760	2
Reds	15,800	1.738	0.738	2
Greens	12,000	1.320	0.320	1
Blues	6,100	0.671	0.671	1
Pinks	3,100	0.341	0.341	0
Total	100,000	8/11	3	11

== Pros and cons ==
It is easy for a voter to understand how the largest remainder method allocates seats. Moreover, the largest remainder method satisfies the quota rule (each party's seats are equal to its ideal share of seats, either rounded up or rounded down) and was designed to satisfy that criterion. However, this comes at the cost of greater inequalities in the seats-to-votes ratio, which can violate the principle of one man, one vote.

However, a greater concern for social choice theorists, and the primary cause behind its abandonment in many countries, is the tendency of such rules to produce erratic or irrational behaviors called apportionment paradoxes:

- Increasing the number of seats in a legislature can decrease a party's apportionment of seats, called the Alabama paradox.
- Adding more parties to the legislature can cause a bizarre kind of spoiler effect called the new state paradox.
  - When Congress first admitted Oklahoma to the Union, the House was expanded by 5 seats, equal to Oklahoma's apportionment, to ensure it would not affect the seats for any existing states. However, when the full apportionment was recalculated, the House was stunned to learn Oklahoma's entry had caused New York to lose a seat to Maine, despite there being no change in either state's population.
  - By the same token, apportionments may depend on the precise order in which the apportionment is calculated. For example, identifying winning independents first and electing them, then apportioning the remaining seats, will produce a different result from treating each independent as if they were their own party and then computing a single overall apportionment.

Such paradoxes also have the additional drawback of making it difficult or impossible to generalize procedure to more complex apportionment problems such as biproportional apportionments or partial vote linkage. This is in part responsible for the extreme complexity of administering elections by quota-based rules like the single transferable vote (see counting single transferable votes).

=== Alabama paradox ===
The Alabama paradox is when an increase in the total number of seats leads to a decrease in the number of seats allocated to a certain party. In the example below, when the number of seats to be allocated is increased from 25 to 26, parties D and E end up with fewer seats, despite their entitlements increasing.

With 25 seats, the results are:

Party	A	B	C	D	E	F	Total
Votes	1500	1500	900	500	500	200	5100
Quotas received	7.35	7.35	4.41	2.45	2.45	0.98	25
Automatic seats	7	7	4	2	2	0	22
Remainder	0.35	0.35	0.41	0.45	0.45	0.98	
Surplus seats	0	0	0	1	1	1	3
Total seats	7	7	4	3	3	1	25

With 26 seats, the results are:

Party	A	B	C	D	E	F	Total
Votes	1500	1500	900	500	500	200	5100
Quotas received	7.65	7.65	4.59	2.55	2.55	1.02	26
Automatic seats	7	7	4	2	2	1	23
Remainder	0.65	0.65	0.59	0.55	0.55	0.02	
Surplus seats	1	1	1	0	0	0	3
Total seats	8	8	5	2	2	1	26
