= Huntington–Hill method =

Proportional electoral system

The Huntington–Hill method, sometimes called method of equal proportions, is a highest averages method for assigning seats in a legislature to political parties or states. Since 1941, this method has been used to apportion the 435 seats in the United States House of Representatives following the completion of each decennial census.

The method minimizes the relative difference in the number of constituents represented by each legislator. In other words, the method selects the allocation such that no transfer of a seat from one state to another can reduce the percent error in representation for both states.

== Apportionment method ==
In this method, as a first step, each of the 50 states is given its one guaranteed seat in the House of Representatives, leaving 385 seats to be assigned. The remaining seats are allocated one at a time, to the state with the highest average district population, to bring its district population down. However, it is not clear if the average should be calculated before or after allocating an additional seat, and the two procedures give different results. Huntington-Hill uses a continuity correction as a compromise, given by taking the geometric mean of both divisors, i.e.:

$$A_{n} = \frac{P}{\sqrt{n(n+1)}}$$

where P is the population of the state, and n is the number of seats it currently holds before the possible allocation of the next seat. Each time a state is assigned a seat, its n is incremented by 1, causing its priority value to be reduced.

Consider the reapportionment following the 2020 U.S. census. After every state is given one seat:

1. The 51st allocated seat goes to the state with the largest A_{1} priority value, which in this instance is the largest-population state, California, with the value 39,576,757/√(1(1+1)) = 27,984,993 ≈ 28.0 M. Its A_{2} priority value is then 39,576,757/√(2(2+1)) ≈ 16.2 M.
2. The 52nd seat goes to Texas, the 2nd largest state, because its A_{1} ≈ 20.6 M is larger than the A_{n} of any other state.
3. The 53rd seat goes back to California, because its A_{2} ≈ 16.2 M is again larger than the A_{n} of any other state; it now has three seats.
4. The 54th seat goes to Florida, the 3rd largest state, because its A_{1} ≈ 15.3 M is the largest at this point.
5. The 55th seat is New York’s, the 4th largest state, because its A_{1} ≈ 14.3 M is now the largest.
6. The 56th seat goes again to Texas for three seats, as its A_{2} ≈ 11.9 M is the largest.
7. The 57th seat is then California’s for four seats, as its A_{3} ≈ 11.4 M is the largest.
8. The 58th seat then goes to Pennsylvania, the 5th largest state, with its A_{1} ≈ 9.2 M being the largest.

This process continues until all remaining seats are assigned. This process is illustrated in this table, where the maximum A value is highlighted, along with the increased number of seats assigned to that state:

Congressional Apportionment 2020 — Huntington–Hill Method
	Seats 1-50		Seat 51		Seat 52		Seat 53		Seat 54		Seat 55		Seat 56		Seat 57		Seat 58		...	Seat 435	
State	P	n	A (M)	n	A (M)	n	A (M)	n	A (M)	n	A (M)	n	A (M)	n	A (M)	n	A (M)	n	...	A_{final}	n_{final}
California	39,576,757	1	28.0	2	16.2	2	16.2	3	11.4	3	11.4	3	11.4	3	11.4	4	8.8	4	...	753,877	52
Texas	29,183,290	1	20.6	1	20.6	2	11.9	2	11.9	2	11.9	2	11.9	3	8.4	3	8.4	3	...	758,071	38
Florida	21,570,527	1	15.3	1	15.3	1	15.3	1	15.3	2	8.8	2	8.8	2	8.8	2	8.8	2	...	756,977	28
New York	20,215,751	1	14.3	1	14.3	1	14.3	1	14.3	1	14.3	2	8.3	2	8.3	2	8.3	2	...	762,994	26
Pennsylvania	13,011,844	1	9.2	1	9.2	1	9.2	1	9.2	1	9.2	1	9.2	1	9.2	1	9.2	2	...	743,838	17
Illinois	12,822,739	1	9.1	1	9.1	1	9.1	1	9.1	1	9.1	1	9.1	1	9.1	1	9.1	1	...	733,027	17
...	...	...	...	...	...	...	...	...	...	...	...	...	...	...	...	...	...	...	...	...	...
Totals	331,108,434	50	6.6	51	6.4	52	6.3	53	6.2	54	6.1	55	6.0	56	5.9	57	5.8	58	...	762,045	435

== Division by zero ==
Unlike the D'Hondt and Sainte-Laguë systems, which allow the allocation of seats by calculating successive quotients right away, the Huntington–Hill system requires each party or state have at least one seat to avoid a division by zero error. In the U.S. House of Representatives, this is ensured by guaranteeing each state at least one seat; in party-list representation, small parties would likely be eliminated using some electoral threshold, or the first divisor can be modified.

== Example ==
Consider an example to distribute 8 seats between three parties A, B, C having respectively 100,000, 80,000 and 30,000 votes.

Each eligible party is assigned one seat. With all the initial seats assigned, the remaining five seats are distributed by a priority number calculated as follows. Each eligible party's (Parties A, B, and C) total votes is divided by √2 • 1 ≈ 1.41, then by approximately 2.45, 3.46, 4.47, 5.48, 6.48, 7.48, and 8.49. The 5 highest entries, marked with asterisks, range from 70,711 down to 28,868. For each, the corresponding party gets another seat.

Denominator	√1·2 ≈ 1.41	√2·3 ≈ 2.45	√3·4 ≈ 3.46	√4·5 ≈ 4.47	√5·6 ≈ 5.48	√6·7 ≈ 6.48	√7·8 ≈ 7.48	√8·9 ≈ 8.49	Initial seats	Seats won (*)	Total Seats	Ideal seats
Party A	70,711*	40,825*	28,868*	22,361	18,257	15,430	13,363	11,785	1	3	4	3.8
Party B	56,569*	32,660*	23,094	17,889	14,606	12,344	10,690	9,428	1	2	3	3.0
Party C	21,213	12,247	8,660	6,708	5,477	4,629	4,009	3,536	1	0	1	1.1

== See also ==
- Edward Vermilye Huntington
- Highest averages method
- Joseph Adna Hill
