= Droop quota =

Votes required to win a seat in proportional systems

In the study of electoral systems, the Droop quota (sometimes called the Hagenbach-Bischoff, Britton, or Newland-Britton quota (Note: Some authors use the terms "Newland-Britton quota" or "exact Droop quota" to refer to the quantity described in this article, and reserve the term "Droop quota" for the original form of the Droop quota (found in the works of Henry Droop).)) is the minimum number of votes a party or candidate needs to receive in a district to guarantee they will win at least one seat.

The Droop quota is used in proportional representation systems to extend the concept of a majority to multiwinner elections, taking the place of the 50% bar in single-winner elections. Just as any candidate with more than half of all votes is guaranteed to be declared the winner in single-seat election, any candidate with more than a Droop quota's worth of votes is guaranteed to win a seat in a multiwinner election.

Besides establishing winners, the Droop quota is used to define the number of excess votes, i.e. votes not needed by a candidate who has been declared elected. In quota–based systems such as STV or expanding approvals, these excess votes can be transferred to other candidates to prevent them from being wasted. (As well, the equivalent of one quota is the number of votes not used to elect anyone in many STV contests.)

The Droop quota was first suggested by the English lawyer and mathematician Henry Richmond Droop (1831–1884) as an alternative to the Hare quota and later by Swiss physicist Eduard Hagenbach-Bischof in the context of STV and not for the largest remainder method.

The Droop quota is used in almost all STV elections, including those in Australia, the Republic of Ireland, Northern Ireland, and Malta. It is also used in South Africa to allocate seats by the largest remainder method. Switzerland uses the Droop quota, calling it the Hagenbach-Bischof quota.

Israel's Bader-Ofer method of apparentment, in which excess votes are pooled between two parties who sign a vote-sharing agreement, uses the Hagenbach-Bischoff quota to determine largest remainders for allocation of some seats in the Knesset.

It has also been criticized for its ability to create no-show paradoxes, situations where a candidate or party loses a seat as a result of having won too many votes. Such an untoward outcome can occur regardless of whether the quota is used with largest remainders or STV. Charges of the Droop producing the no-show paradox are based on having knowledge of how a vote would be transferred if a candidate were eliminated when that candidate may not have been if a different quota was used. Such knowledge is not common in real-life elections. As well, any system that uses ranked votes produces different results if candidates are in a different order, which is partly determined by how votes are split, and therefore the no-show paradox charge can apply to any ranked voting system no matter what quota is used. Some analysis states that no-show paradoxes are extremely rare in real-world elections. For one thing, transfers have little effect in general on who is elected, the winners usually being among the front runners in the first round of counting anyway.

== Definition ==
The value of the exact Droop quota for a $k$-winner election is given by the expression:

$\frac{\text{total votes}}{k+1}$

A candidate with more than the exact Droop quota is assured of election. In the case of a single-winner election, this reduces to the familiar simple majority rule. Under such a rule, a candidate can be declared elected as soon as they have more than 50% of the vote, i.e. their vote total exceeds $\frac{\text{total votes}}{2}$.

Similarly, a candidate who, at any point, holds more than one exact Droop quota's worth of votes is guaranteed to win a seat. (Note: By abuse of notation, mathematicians may write the quota as votes/(k+1) + 𝜖, where $\epsilon > 0$ is taken arbitrarily close to 0 (i.e. as a limit), which allows breaking some ties for the last seat.)

Sometimes, the exact Droop quota is written as a share of all votes, in which case it has value 1/(k+1).

=== Original Droop quota ===
The original Droop as devised by Henry Droop was one more than the exact Droop:

$\frac{\text{total votes}}{k+1}+1$

Any candidate whose vote tally equals or exceeds the original Droop quota is declared elected. The use of the original Droop quota, as opposed to the use of the exact Droop or another smaller quota, prevents too many achieving Droop, compared to the number of seats being filled (k). (Although seldom is this a problem, as even a few exhausted ballots prevents this possibility anyway.)

=== Derivation of the original Droop quota ===
The Droop quota was derived by considering what would happen if k candidates (here called "Droop winners") have achieved the Droop quota: could too many achieve quota? The goal was to identify whether an additional candidate could defeat any of the candidates who have quota. If each quota winner's share of the vote equals 1/(k+1) +1, all unelected candidates' share of the vote, taken together, would be less 1/(k+1) +1 votes, so no fear that more would achieve quota than the number of seats to be filled.

Thus, even if there were only one unelected candidate who held all the remaining votes, their vote tally would not equal any of those with Droop quota.

=== Choice of exact Droop versus original Droop ===
Modern variants of STV use fractional transfers of ballots to eliminate uncertainty and therefore do not need to use the original whole-vote Droop quota. The original Droop quota is not necessary in elections that allow fractional transfers of ballots.

However, some older implementations of STV with whole vote reassignment did not use fractional votes and so instead either rounded up or added one and truncated:

$\left\lceil \frac{\text{total votes}}{k+1} \right\rceil \approx \left\lfloor \frac{\text{total votes}}{k+1} + 1 \right\rfloor$

This whole-vote variant of the quota is not necessary in the context of modern elections with fractional votes, and it can cause problems in small elections. However, it is the most commonly used definition in legislative codes worldwide.

== Example in STV ==
The following election has 3 seats to be filled by single transferable vote. There are 4 candidates: George Washington, Alexander Hamilton, Thomas Jefferson, and Aaron Burr. There are 102 voters, but two of the votes are spoiled.

The total number of valid votes is 100, and there are 3 seats. The exact Droop quota is therefore $\frac{100}{3+1} = 25$. These votes are as follows:

	45 voters	20 voters	25 voters	10 voters
1	Washington	Burr	Jefferson	Hamilton
2	Hamilton	Jefferson	Burr	Washington
3	Jefferson	Washington	Washington	Jefferson

First preferences for each candidate are tallied:

- Washington: 45
- Hamilton: 10
- Burr: 20
- Jefferson: 25

Only Washington has more than 25 votes. As a result, he is immediately elected. Washington has 20 excess votes that can be transferred to their second choice, Hamilton. The tallies therefore become:

- Washington: 25
- Hamilton: 30
- Burr: 20
- Jefferson: 25

Hamilton is elected, so his excess votes are redistributed. Thanks to Hamilton's support, Jefferson receives 30 votes to Burr's 20 and is elected.

If all of Hamilton's supporters had instead backed Burr, the election for the last seat would have been tied, requiring a tiebreaker. Generally, ties are broken by electing the candidate who had the most first preference votes, or taking the limit of the results as an artificially increased quota is allowed to relax to the exact Droop quota.

== Varieties ==
The term Droop quota is frequently defined or understood in a variety of ways that can cause confusion as to what value legislators and political observers are referring. At least six different versions appear in various legal codes or definitions of the quota, all varying by one vote. The Electoral Reform Society handbook on STV has advised against such variants since at least 1976, as they can cause problems with proportionality in small elections. In addition, it means that vote totals cannot be summarized into percentages because the winning candidate may depend on the choice of unit or total number of ballots (not just their distribution across candidates). Common variants of the Droop quota include:

$\begin{array}{rlrl} \text{Historical:} &&\Bigl\lfloor \frac{\text{votes}}{\text{seats}+1}\Bigr\rfloor + 1 && \left\lceil \frac{\text{votes}}{\text{seats}+1} \right\rceil &&\Bigl\lfloor \frac{\text{votes}}{\text{seats}+1} + 1 \Bigr\rfloor \\ \text{Accidental:} && \phantom{\Bigl\lfloor} \frac{\text{votes} + 1}{\text{seats} + 1} \phantom{\Bigr\rfloor} && \phantom{\Bigl\lfloor} \frac{\text{votes}}{\text{seats}+1} + 1 \phantom{\Bigr\rfloor} \\ \text{Unusual:} && \left\lfloor \frac{\text{votes}}{\text{seats}+1} \right\rfloor && \left\lfloor \frac{\text{votes}}{\text{seats}+1} + \frac{1}{2} \right\rfloor \end{array}$

The variants in the first line come from Droop's discussion in the context of Hare's STV proposal. Hare assumed that to calculate election results, physical ballots would be reshuffled across piles and did not consider the possibility of fractional votes. In such a situation, rounding down and adding one, or alternatively rounding the number of votes up, (Note: The two are only different when the number of votes is exactly a whole number.) introduces as little error as possible, while ensuring that not too many can achieve quota.

Some believe the original form of the Droop quota is still needed in modern STV systems to prevent an extra candidate reaching quota than there are winners. As Newland and Britton noted in 1974, this is not a problem: if the last two winners both receive a Droop quota of votes, rules can be applied to break the tie, and ties can occur regardless of which quota is used. Due to perceived need for this extra safety measure, Ireland, Malta and Australia have used Droop's original quota, $\frac{votes}{seats+1} + 1$ , for the last hundred years.

== Comparison with Hare ==
The Droop quota is sometimes confused with the more intuitive Hare quota. While the Droop quota gives the number of votes needed to mathematically guarantee a candidate's election, the Hare quota gives the number of voters represented by each winner in an exactly proportional system (i.e. one where each vote is represented equally and every vote is used). Unfortunately, frequently one or more votes are found to be exhausted and there is no way for the last elected candidate to be elected with Hare.

According to some, the Hare quota gives more proportional outcomes on average because it is statistically unbiased.

By contrast, the Droop quota is biased towards large parties. Being smaller than Hare, it allows more parties to take two or more seats. The Droop quota may allow a party representing less than half of the voters to take a majority of seats.

Although in common use in both STV elections today and some largest remainder PR systems, the use of the Droop quota in proportional representation has been criticized for its seeming bias toward large parties.

However, the Droop quota has the advantage over Hare that any party receiving more than half the votes in a district will receive at least half of the seats in the district, while Hare quota sometimes denies that type of win to the leading party.

It can be shown that Droop produces more transferable votes following the announcement of the first-count winners, and these transfer are conducted prior to any elimination of candidates, so in certain cases, the use of the Droop quota ensures party's full slates are available longer. Under Hare, fewer votes are considered surplus so transfers are done quicker and candidates are eliminated sooner, thus potentially eliminating a candidate who, if they had survived, might have been elected as votes were transferred.

== See also ==
- List of democracy and elections-related topics

== Sources ==
- Robert, Henry M.; et al. (2011). Robert's Rules of Order Newly Revised (11th ed.). Philadelphia, Pennsylvania: Da Capo Press. p. 4. ISBN 978-0-306-82020-5.
