= Hare quota =

Electoral system quota formula

The Hare quota (sometimes called the simple, ideal, or Hamilton quota) is the number of voters represented by each legislator in an idealized system of proportional representation where every vote is used to elect someone. The Hare quota is equal to the number of votes divided by the number of seats. The Hare quota was used in Thomas Hare's scheme for a single transferable vote system and can still be used for this purpose, though the Droop quota is used for most STV elections today. The Hare quota is often used to set electoral thresholds and to calculate apportionments under party-list proportional representation when using the largest remainder method. In such cases, the Hare quota gives unbiased apportionments that do not favor either large or small parties.

Unlike Droop's quota, the Hare quota does not guarantee a party with a majority of votes in the district will win at least half the seats. In addition, all quota rules can result in a spoiler effect called the new state paradox, where adding votes to party A can cause an unrelated party B to lose seats to party C. The quota was first proposed by Alexander Hamilton for use in United States congressional apportionment as part of what is now called Hamilton's method.

== Formula ==
The Hare quota may be given as:

$$\frac{\mbox{total} \; \mbox{votes}}{\mbox{total} \; \mbox{seats}}$$

where

- Total votes = the total valid poll; that is, the number of valid (unspoilt) votes cast in an election.
- Total seats = the total number of seats to be filled in the election.

=== Hamilton method ===
The Hamilton method, also known as the method of largest remainders, uses the Hare quota to allocate seats in proportion to votes.

Steps:

1. Calculate the Hare quota.
2. Divide each party's total votes by the Hare quota to get a raw seat count.
3. Assign each party the whole number part of their seat count.
4. Distribute any remaining seats to parties with the largest fractional remainders.

== Use in STV ==
In an STV election a candidate who reaches the quota is elected while any votes a candidate receives above the quota in many cases have the opportunity to be transferred to another candidate in accordance to the voter's next usable marked preference. Thus the quota is used both to determine who is elected and to determine the number of surplus votes when a person is elected with quota. When the Droop quota is used, often about a quota of votes are not used to elect anyone (a much lower proportion that under the first-past-the-post voting system) so the quota is a cue to the number of votes that are used to actually elect someone. The Hare quota was devised by Thomas Hare, one of the first to work out a complete STV system. The number of votes in the quota is determined by the district magnitude of the district in conjunction with the number of valid votes cast.

=== Example ===
Suppose an STV election using the Hare quota has two seats to be filled and three candidates: Andrea, Brad, and Carter. One hundred voters voted, each casting one vote and marking a back-up preference, to be used only in case the first preference candidate is un-electable or elected with surplus. There are 100 ballots showing preferences as follows:

Number of voters	60 voters	26 voters	14 voters
1st preference	Andrea	Brad	Carter
2nd preference	Carter	Andrea	Andrea

Because there are 100 voters and 2 seats, the Hare quota is:

$$\frac{100}{2} = 50$$

To begin the count the first preferences cast for each candidate are tallied and are as follows:

- Andrea: 60
- Brad: 26
- Carter: 14

Andrea has reached the quota and is declared elected. She has 10 votes more than the quota so these votes are transferred to Carter, as specified on the ballots. The tallies of the remaining candidates therefore now become:

- Brad: 26
- Carter: 24

At this stage, there are only two candidates remaining and one seat open. The most-popular candidate is declared elected; the other is declared defeated. Although Brad has not reached the quota, he is declared elected since he has more votes than Carter. The winners are therefore Andrea and Brad.

== Use in party-list PR ==
Hong Kong, Brazil, and Guyana use the Hare quota in largest-remainder systems. Costa Rica uses a modified Hare quota for its Legislative Assembly. In Brazil's largest remainder system the Hare quota is used to set the basic number of seats allocated to each party or coalition. Any remaining seats are allocated according to the D'Hondt method. This procedure is used for the Federal Chamber of Deputies, State Assemblies, Municipal and Federal District Chambers.

=== In Hong Kong ===
For geographical constituencies, the SAR government adopted weakly-proportional representation using the largest remainder method with Hare quota in 1997. Typically, largest remainders paired with the Hare quota produces unbiased results that are difficult to manipulate; however, the combination of extremely small districts, no electoral thresholds led to a system that parties could manipulate using careful vote management. By running candidates on separate tickets, Hong Kong parties aimed to ensure they received no seats in the first step of apportionment, but still received enough votes to take several of the remainder seats when running against a divided opposition. The Democratic Party, for example, filled three separate tickets in the 8-seat New Territories West constituency in the 2008 Legislative Council elections. In the 2012 election, no candidate list won more than one seat in any of the six PR constituencies (a total of 40 seats). In Hong Kong, the Hare quota has effectively created a multi-member single-vote system in the territory.

== Mathematical properties ==
In situations where parties' total share of the vote varies randomly, the Hare quota is the unique unbiased quota for an electoral system based on vote-transfers or quotas; however, if the quota is used in small constituencies with no electoral threshold, it is possible to manipulate the system by running several candidates on separate lists, allowing each to win a remainder seat with less than a full quota. This can make the method behave like the single non-transferable vote in practice, as has happened in Hong Kong. By contrast, rules based on the Droop quota cannot be manipulated in the same way, as it is never possible for a party to gain seats by splitting.
