= Military government =

Government administered by military forces

World's states colored by systems of government: Parliamentary systems: Head of government is elected or nominated by and accountable to the legislature. Constitutional monarchy with a ceremonial monarch Semi-constitutional monarchy: Monarch holds significant executive or legislative power but is still restricted by the constitution. Parliamentary republic with a ceremonial president Parliamentary republic with an executive president Presidential system: Head of government (president) is popularly elected and independent of the legislature. Presidential republic Theocratic presidential republic: Supreme leader is highest authority; popularly elected president still exists. Hybrid systems: Semi-presidential republic: Executive president is independent of the legislature; head of government is appointed by the president and is accountable to the legislature. Assembly-independent republic: Head of government (president or directory) is elected by the legislature, but is not accountable to it. Other systems: Islamic theocracy: Supreme leader holds unlimited political and religious power; state and faith are a single institution. Absolute monarchy: Monarch has unlimited power. One-party state: Power is constitutionally linked to a single political party. Provisional government: Current regime is temporary or transitional; no permanent constitution. Military junta: Committee of military leaders controls the government; constitutional provisions are suspended. Places without governments. Note: this chart represents the de jure systems of government, not the de facto degree of democracy.

A military government is any government that is administered by a military, whether or not this government is legal under the laws of the jurisdiction at issue or by an occupying power. It is usually administered by military personnel.

== Military occupation ==
Military occupation, also called belligerent occupation or simply occupation, is temporary hostile control exerted by a ruling power's military apparatus over a sovereign territory that is outside the legal boundaries of that ruling power's own sovereign territory. The controlled territory is called occupied territory, and the ruling power is called the occupant. Occupation's intended temporary nature distinguishes it from annexation and colonialism. The occupant often establishes military rule to facilitate administration of the occupied territory, though this is not a necessary characteristic of occupation.

== Martial law ==
Martial law

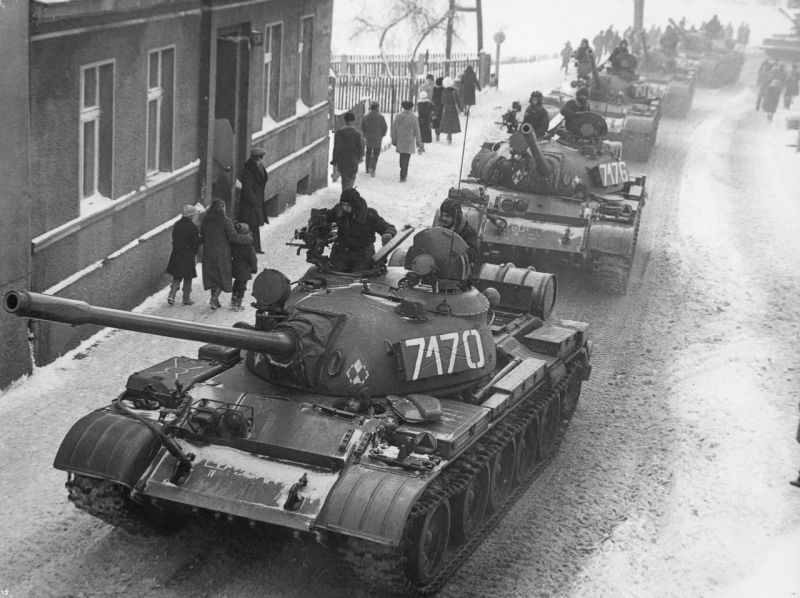
Tanks during the imposition of martial law in Poland, December 1981

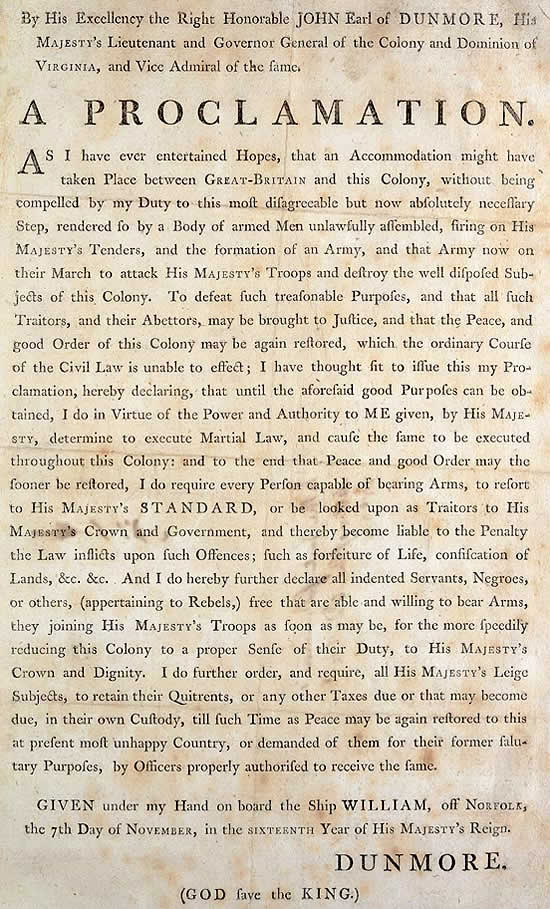
Dunmore's Proclamation declaring martial law in the Colony of Virginia on 7 November 1775

Martial law is the replacement of civilian government by military rule and the suspension of civilian legal processes for military powers. Martial law can continue for a specified amount of time, or indefinitely, and standard civil liberties may be suspended for as long as martial law continues. Most often, martial law is declared in times of war or emergencies such as civil unrest and natural disasters. Alternatively, martial law may be declared in instances of military coups d'état.

== Military dictatorship ==
A military dictatorship is a type of dictatorship where supreme power is held and exercised by a member of the armed forces. Military dictatorships are usually led by the commander-in-chief of the military or the leading figure of a military junta. They are most often formed by military coups or by the empowerment of the military through a popular uprising in times of domestic unrest or instability. The military nominally seeks power to restore order or fight corruption, but the personal motivations of military officers will vary.

Modern military dictatorship developed in Latin America during the 19th century, and it expanded in Europe during the early-20th century. It saw a resurgence during the Cold War, and new military dictatorships were established in Africa, Asia, and Latin America in the 1960s. Some scholars have asserted that the number of military dictatorships has declined since the end of the Cold War.

== Military junta ==
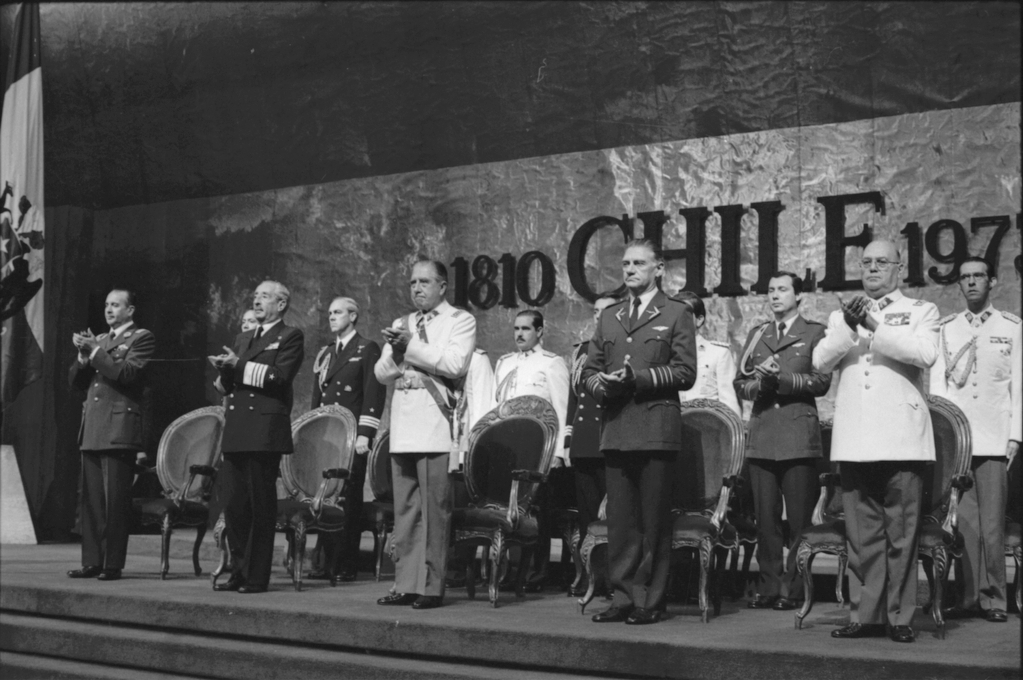
The Chilean military junta, led by Augusto Pinochet in March 1986

A military junta (/ˈhʊntə, ˈdʒʌntə/) is a system of government led by a committee of military leaders. The term junta means "meeting" or "committee" and originated in the national and local junta organized by the Spanish resistance to Napoleon's invasion of Spain in 1808. The term is now used to refer to an authoritarian form of government characterized by a politically dominant group of military officers.

== Stratocracy ==
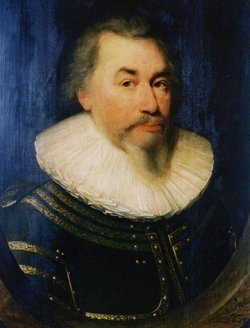
Portrait of Robert Filmer, the first person to use the term stratocracy in English.

A stratocracy is a form of government headed by military chiefs. The branches of government are administered by military forces, the government is legal under the laws of the jurisdiction at issue, and is usually carried out by military workers.

== Military democracy ==
A military democracy is a war-based society that practices democracy. The category is often applied to historical peoples. An example is Frederick Engels' characterization:

"The military commander, the council, and the popular assembly formed the organs of military democracy, military because war and the organization of war were now the regular functions of life of the people. The wealth of their neighbors excited the greed of the peoples, who began to regard acquisition of wealth as one of the main purposes in life. They were barbarians: plunder appeared to them easier and even more honorable than productive work. War, once waged simply to avenge aggression or as a means of enlarging territory that had become inadequate, was now waged for the sake of plunder alone, and became a regular profession. . . . The growth of slavery had already begun to brand working for a living as slavish and more ignominious than engaging in plunder."

According to Engels, the Greek Heroic Age was a typical example of military democracy. Lewis Henry Morgan spoke of two features: "the military state of society, and the system of administration consisting of an elective and removable supreme chief, a council of elders and a popular assembly."

== Sources ==
- Abrahamsen, Rita (2018). "Return of the generals? Global militarism in Africa from the Cold War to the present". Security Dialogue. 49 (1–2): 19–31. doi:10.1177/0967010617742243. ISSN 0967-0106. S2CID 148603639.
- Blackford, Paul W. (March 1956). "Stratocracy, a Seventeenth Century Greek Coinage". The Classical Journal. 51 (6). The Classical Association of the Middle West and South: 279–280. JSTOR 3292889.
- Bouvier, John; Gleason, Daniel A. (1999) [1851]. Institutes of American law. The Lawbook Exchange, Ltd. ISBN 978-1-886363-80-9.
- Danopoulos, Constantine P., ed. (1988). The Decline Of Military Regimes: The Civilian Influence. Westview Press. ISBN 978-1-000-31579-0.
- de Grazia, Alfred (1970). "The Perennial Stratocrats". Kalos: What is to be done with our World?. Archived from the original on 25 May 2021.
