= Directorial system =

Socio-political system with shared executive power

World's states colored by systems of government: Parliamentary systems: Head of government is elected or nominated by and accountable to the legislature. Constitutional monarchy with a ceremonial monarch Semi-constitutional monarchy: Monarch holds significant executive or legislative power but is still restricted by the constitution. Parliamentary republic with a ceremonial president Parliamentary republic with an executive president Presidential system: Head of government (president) is popularly elected and independent of the legislature. Presidential republic Theocratic presidential republic: Supreme leader is highest authority; popularly elected president still exists. Hybrid systems: Semi-presidential republic: Executive president is independent of the legislature; head of government is appointed by the president and is accountable to the legislature. Assembly-independent republic: Head of government (president or directory) is elected by the legislature, but is not accountable to it. Other systems: Islamic theocracy: Supreme leader holds unlimited political and religious power; state and faith are a single institution. Absolute monarchy: Monarch has unlimited power. One-party state: Power is constitutionally linked to a single political party. Provisional government: Current regime is temporary or transitional; no permanent constitution. Military junta: Committee of military leaders controls the government; constitutional provisions are suspended. Places without governments. Note: this chart represents the de jure systems of government, not the de facto degree of democracy.

The directorial or executive council system is a political system in which executive power is held directly by a collegial body, typically called a council, directory, or cabinet, with no single head of government. The system was pioneered by the Supreme Executive Council of Pennsylvania in the American Revolution and the French Directory, which ended the Reign of Terror. It has since been used by the Swiss Confederation as part of the 1848 Swiss Constitution, adopted after the Sonderbund War.

== Current directorial systems ==
Countries with directorial heads of state sharing ceremonial functions only:

- Andorra: co-princes
- Bosnia and Herzegovina: presidency
- Eswatini: Ngwenyama and Ndlovukati (only Ngwenyama has executive functions)
- San Marino: Captains Regent

Countries governed by a directory:

- Nicaragua: co-presidents (also dual heads of state, diarchy)
- San Marino: Congress of State
- Switzerland: Federal Council (also collective head of state in corpore, as a whole)

Supranational and subnational entities governed by a directory:

- European Union: European Council and European Commission
- Northern Ireland: First Minister and deputy First Minister
- Switzerland: cantons, municipalities

=== Directorial republic in Switzerland ===
One country now using this form of government is Switzerland. In Switzerland, directories operate at all levels of administration: federal, cantonal and municipal. On the face of it, the Swiss Federal Council might appear to be a typical parliamentary government; technically, however, it is not a meeting of ministers, but a college of heads of state and simultaneously the federal cabinet. The current president of the confederation is in fact only a primus inter pares (first among equals) with representative functions in particular for diplomacy with other States, and without any power either of direction or of coordination of the activity of colleagues. The Swiss Federal Council is elected by the Federal Assembly for four years, and comprises seven members, among whom one serves as president and one as vice-president on a rotating basis, although these positions are symbolic in normal circumstances. Unlike in a parliamentary system, the Federal Council is not answerable before the Federal Assembly, but is elected for a roughly concurrent term of office. The link between the Swiss managerial system and the presidential system is even more evident for the cantonal governments, where currently all directors are all individually directly elected by the voters.

== History ==
In political history, the term directory, in French directoire, is applied to high collegial institutions of state composed of members styled director. Early directorial systems were the Ambrosian Republic (1447-1450), the Bohemian Revolt (1618–1620), New England Confederation (1643–1686), partially in First Stadtholderless Period of Dutch Republic (1650–1672), Pennsylvania Constitution of 1776 and the Directory of 1795–1799 in France.

The French Directory was inspired by the Pennsylvania Constitution of 1776, which prominently featured a collegial 12-member Supreme Executive Council with the president in fact only primus inter pares (first among equals). Variants of this form of government, based on the French model, were also established in the European regions conquered by France during the French Revolutionary Wars. Directorial systems have a lower presidentialism metric value compared to presidential systems due to lower concentration of political power in the hands of one individual. Military juntas differ from the directorial system by not being elected. Utilizing sortition to select multiple executives can lead to a directorial system.

== Former directorial systems ==
In the past, countries with elected directories included:

- Bohemian Revolt from 1618 to 1620
- New England Confederation from 1643 to 1686
- Commonwealth of England from 1649 to 1653
- Dutch Republic partially in First Stadtholderless Period from 1650 to 1672
- Pennsylvania - Supreme Executive Council of the Commonwealth of Pennsylvania from 1777 to 1790
- First French Republic - French Directory from 1795 to 1799
- Cisalpine Republic from 1795 to 1799
- Cispadane Republic from 1796 to 1797
- Roman Republic (1798–1799) from 1798 to 1799
- Parthenopaean Republic in 1799
- Costa Rica - The Town's Legates Junta and High Government Junta from 1821 to 1823
- Provisional Government of Oregon - Executive Committee from 1843 to 1845
- Roman Republic (1849) from 1849 to 1850 (Triumvirate)
- Ukrainian People's Republic - Directorate of Ukraine from 1918 to 1920
- Republic of China - National Government - from 1928 to 1947
- Uruguay - National Council of Administration from 1919 to 1933 and National Council of Government from 1952 to 1967
- East Germany - State Council of East Germany from 1960 to 1990
- Union of Soviet Socialist Republics - All-Union Central Executive Committee from 1922 to 1938; Presidium of the Supreme Soviet from 1938 to 1989
- Polish People's Republic - State Council of the Polish People's Republic from 1952 to 1989
- Socialist Federal Republic of Yugoslavia - Presidency of Yugoslavia, de jure from 1971, de facto from 1980 to 1991.

== See also ==
- Athenian democracy
- Collegiality
- Group representation constituency
- Executive (government)
