= Prime-ministerial system =

Parliamentary system variant

A prime-ministerial system, or parliamentary system with a directly elected prime minister is a form of government in which voters vote for both members of legislature and the prime minister, but the prime minister is nonetheless dependent on parliamentary confidence. It is possible under a constitutional monarchy, but has only existed in republics.

The system was identified as distinct from traditional parliamentary systems by Maurice Duverger and later was used in Israel from 1996 to 2001.

Like semi-presidential systems and parliamentary systems with an executive president, elected prime-ministerial systems are variations of parliamentary systems. However, unlike the former, the prime-ministerial system does not have a dual executive (does not include the head of state in the executive alongside the prime-minister), but there exists a separate (non-executive) head of state (unlike in the latter).

After Israel decided to abolish the direct election of prime ministers in 2001, there are no national prime-ministerial systems of this form in the world; however, a variant of the prime-ministerial system is used in Israeli and Italian cities and towns to elect mayors and councils (with a unified executive).

Versions with a fused head of state and head of government exist in Kiribati and Guyana. In 2024, voters in Liechtenstein rejected the establishment of such a system in a referendum.

== Rationale ==
In his 1956 proposal, Maurice Duverger suggested that France could attain government stability by means of a direct election of the Prime Minister, that was to take place at the same time as the legislative election, by means of a separate ballot paper. The Prime Minister and his supporting parliamentary majority would need to be inseparable for the whole duration of the legislature: in case of a vote of no-confidence, forced resignation, or dissolution of the parliament, a snap election would be held for both the National Assembly and the Prime Minister. Under Charles de Gaulle, France adopted a different variation on the parliamentary government called semi-presidential system. Duverger's proposal thus remained unnamed until the French political scientist termed it "semi-parliamentary" in 1996. The term semi-parliamentary has taken on a new meaning since then based on the work of Steffen Ganghof.

In Duverger's prime-ministerial system, as in standard parliamentary systems, the prime minister can still be dismissed by a vote of no confidence, this however effectively causes a snap election for both the prime minister and the legislature (a rule commonly expressed by the brocard aut simul stabunt aut simul cadent, Latin for "they will either stand together, or fall together"). Notably, when Israel adopted a prime-ministerial system, this principle was not followed.

The elected prime ministerial system has been described as one of two basic combinations of the presidential and parliamentary models, the other being the assembly-independent executive. While the prime-ministerial system borrows from the presidential system the separate election for the executive branch and from the parliamentary power of the legislature to dismiss it (motion of no confidence), the assembly-independent model is the opposite: the legislature elects the executive, but the executive does not depend on its confidence after election.

== Main characteristics of prime-ministerial systems ==
World's states colored by systems of government: Parliamentary systems: Head of government is elected or nominated by and accountable to the legislature. Constitutional monarchy with a ceremonial monarch Semi-constitutional monarchy: Monarch holds significant executive or legislative power but is still restricted by the constitution. Parliamentary republic with a ceremonial president Parliamentary republic with an executive president Presidential system: Head of government (president) is popularly elected and independent of the legislature. Presidential republic Theocratic presidential republic: Supreme leader is highest authority; popularly elected president still exists. Hybrid systems: Semi-presidential republic: Executive president is independent of the legislature; head of government is appointed by the president and is accountable to the legislature. Assembly-independent republic: Head of government (president or directory) is elected by the legislature, but is not accountable to it. Other systems: Islamic theocracy: Supreme leader holds unlimited political and religious power; state and faith are a single institution. Absolute monarchy: Monarch has unlimited power. One-party state: Power is constitutionally linked to a single political party. Provisional government: Current regime is temporary or transitional; no permanent constitution. Military junta: Committee of military leaders controls the government; constitutional provisions are suspended. Places without governments. Note: this chart represents the de jure systems of government, not the de facto degree of democracy.

- The legislature and the head of government are simultaneously elected by the people, either by a separate ballot or a double simultaneous vote.
- A separate head of state with ceremonial functions may exist (as in most parliamentary systems).
- The legislature has the power to dismiss the head of government with a motion of no confidence (as in a parliamentary system), while the head of state does not.
- The term of the legislature and that of the head of government coincide: if the head of government resigns or is dismissed by the legislature, the legislature is automatically dissolved
- The electoral law may ensure that the parties supporting the directly elected head of government obtain a majority of seats in the legislature (see majority bonus system)

== Examples of prime-ministerial systems ==
=== Direct election of the prime minister of Israel (1996–2001) ===
During the thirteenth Knesset (1992–1996), Israel decided to hold a separate ballot for Prime Minister modeled after American presidential elections. This system was instituted in part because the Israeli electoral system makes it all but impossible for one party to win a majority. However, no majority bonus was assigned to the Prime Minister's supporting party: therefore, he was forced to obtain the support of other parties in the Knesset. As this effectively added rigidity to the system without improving its stability, direct election of the Prime Minister was abolished after the 2001 election.

This system has been described by some as an anti-model of prime-ministerial systems. In Israel, the basic laws allowed, under certain conditions, special elections for the prime minister only, with no dissolution of the Knesset: in practice, there were as many as eight special elections in just a few years, which constitutes a considerable departure from the simul simul principle. For this reason, the Israeli version of the prime-ministerial system was never considered to work functionally.

=== Similar systems ===
A variant of the prime-ministerial system (which also falls under the category of parliamentary systems with an executive president) is where the position of "prime minister" is fused with the head of state (president). This unified, accountable executive model is only used in Kiribati and Guyana. In Kiribati president is elected by plurality voting after candidates for the presidency are nominated by the newly elected legislature. In Guyana, the president and the legislature are elected directly by the people via double simultaneous vote

In 1993, Italy adopted a new electoral law introducing the direct election of mayors, in conjunction with municipal councils. On a single ballot paper, the elector can express two votes, one for the mayor, and the other one for the council. The mayor is elected with a two-round system: at the first round, the candidate receiving the absolute majority of valid votes is elected; if no candidate receives an absolute majority, a second round between the two top-ranking candidates is held. Councils are elected by semi-proportional representation: the party or coalition linked to the mayor elect receives at least 60% of the seats, while the other parties are allocated seats in a proportional fashion. This ensures the existence of a working majority for the mayor: the council can remove the mayor with an absolute majority vote, but in this case it also causes its own dissolution and a snap election. In 1999, a constitutional reform introduced the direct election of regional presidents, whose term is linked to that of regional councils much in the same way as it is the case for mayors and municipal councils.

The Kiritbatian and Italian system differs from the prime-ministerial system in one point of the definition (namely the absence of a separate head of state).

== See also ==
- List of countries by system of government
- List of political systems in France
- Parliamentary system
- Presidential system
- Semi-presidential system
- Semi-parliamentary system
