= Semi-parliamentary system =

Form of government

A diagram of how the semi-parliamentary usually system operates.

Semi-parliamentary system is a system of government in which the legislature is split into two parts that are both directly elected – the first chamber has the power to select and remove the members of the executive by a vote of (no) confidence, while the second chamber has the power to pass or reject legislation.

This variant of parliamentarism was identified and theoretically rationalised by German academic Steffen Ganghof. The federal Parliament of Australia and several Australian state parliaments, as well as the National Diet of Japan, can be classified as semi-parliamentary systems. It has also been a feature of Senate reform proposals in Canada.

The term "semi-parliamentary" was also previously used by Maurice Duverger to describe a prime-ministerial system, in which voters vote separately for both members of legislature and the prime minister, a system Israel used from 1996 to 2001. The semi-parliamentary has also, on occasion, been previously used as a synonym for semi-presidentialism, but also as the conceptual "opposite" of semi-presidentialism.

== Definition ==
In the book "Beyond Presidentialism and Parliamentarism. Democratic Design and the Separation of Powers", German academic Steffen Ganghof gives this abstract definition of semi-parliamentarism:

Under semi-parliamentary government, no part of the executive is elected directly. The prime minister and cabinet are selected by an assembly with two parts, only one of which can dismiss the cabinet in a no-confidence vote even though the other has equal or greater democratic legitimacy and robust veto power over ordinary legislation.

— Steffen Ganghof, (2021) Beyond Presidentialism and Parliamentarism. Democratic Design and the Separation of Powers, Page 67, Oxford University Press

== Rationale and proposals ==
Ganghof points out issues of a lack of separation of powers as present in a traditional parliamentary system, as well as the problems of "executive personalism" (executive power resides in one person only) as found in a presidential system. He suggests confronting both issues by dividing the legislature in a parliamentary system into two elected assemblies:

- The first chamber is the "confidence chamber". It has the power to select and dismiss a prime minister and their ministers, but does not have the final say on legislation.
- The second chamber is the "legislative chamber". It acts in a manner similar to an independent legislative branch, able to introduce legislation and amend or reject legislation from the first chamber (absolute veto power over ordinary legislation), but unable to form or remove the government.
- Both chambers are elected simultaneously, and only the first chamber has the power to dissolve both chambers of the parliament.

This form of semi-parliamentary government has also been further explored by others, including Tarunabh Khaitan, who coined the phrase "Moderated Parliamentarism" to describe a form of semi-parliamentarism with several distinctive features: mixed bicameralism, moderated (but distinct) electoral systems for each chamber, weighted multipartisanship, asynchronous electoral schedules, and deadlock resolution through conference committees. Ganghof's semi-parliamentary model has been highlighted as an alternative institutional solution to low-magnitude district proportional representation that may discourage unserious parties or candidates to run in the confidence chamber.

It has been proposed that semi-parliamentarism may help moderate politics, however a potential challenge such a form of government may encounter is in sustaining the legitimacy of the second legislative chamber. Sortition has been also proposed as a possible system for selecting members on the legislative chamber.

== In practice ==
Semi-parliamentary systems exist in limited form (compared to its theory-driven archetype above) in Australian states and on the federal level as well as in Japan. Ganghof has argued that semi-parliamentarism in practice falls short of the archetypal concept, when the second legislative chamber has deficiencies in democratic legitimacy (compared to the confidence chamber), such as malapportionment (in Australia, this comes from the enshrined federal structure of the Senate), and longer terms of office.

=== Australia ===
In the Australian Parliament, all bills must be passed by a majority in both the House of Representatives (lower house) and the Senate (upper house) before they become law, while only the House of Representatives can form or remove the government. These make the Australian Parliament, in principle, semi-parliamentary.

The Australian Senate is unusual in that it maintains an ability to withhold supply from the government of the day – a power similar to that held in the UK until 1911 by the House of Lords, which has since then been impossible, in the Westminster system. This unique feature was one of the reasons behind the 1975 Australian constitutional crisis. To balance the possible obstructionism, the Australian Constitution allows the prime minister to initiate a double dissolution of both the Senate and the House in the case of a legislative deadlock.

Some political scientists have held that the Australian system of government was consciously devised as a blend or hybrid of the Westminster and the United States systems of government, especially since the Australian Senate is a powerful upper house like the US Senate. This notion is expressed in the nickname "the Washminster mutation". The ability of upper houses to block supply also features in the parliaments of most Australian states.

=== Japan ===
In Japan, only the lower house of the National Diet, the House of Representatives, can form or remove the government. On the other hand, the upper house, the House of Councillors, has the "de facto power of no confidence", as it can veto budget-enabling bills from the House of Representatives, and combine censure motions with a boycott of assembly deliberations. As a result, when the House of Councillors is controlled by the main opposition party or coalition, a phenomenon called Nejire Kokkai or "the Twisted Diet", legislative effectiveness drops substantially and the Japanese government's ability to govern may be undermined. Such a "Twisted Diet" recently happened in 2007-2009 and again in 2011-2012. Since the House of Councillors cannot be dissolved and has longer terms of office (six-year terms, two years longer than those of the House of Representatives), the government had no countermeasures and the prime minister was forced to resign in 2007, 2008, and 2011.

== Alternative meanings ==
=== Prime-ministerial systems ===
In his 1956 proposal, Maurice Duverger suggested that France could attain government stability by means of a direct election of the Prime Minister, that was to take place at the same time as the legislative election, by means of a separate ballot paper. The Prime Minister and his supporting parliamentary majority would need to be inseparable for the whole duration of the legislature: in case of a vote of no-confidence, forced resignation, or dissolution of the parliament, a snap election would be held for both the National Assembly and the Prime Minister.

Under Charles de Gaulle, France adopted a different variant of the parliamentary government, since called semi-presidential system. Duverger's proposal thus remained unnamed until the French political scientist termed it "semi-parliamentary" in 1996. After Israel decided to abolish the direct election of prime ministers in 2001, there are no national prime-ministerial systems in the world; however, a prime-ministerial system is used in Israeli and Italian cities and towns to elect mayors and councils.

=== Variants of semi-presidentialism ===
The term semi-parliamentary has also, on occasion, been previously been used as a synonym for semi-presidentialism. While the more common categorisation semi-presidential is premier-presidential and president-parliamentary, an alternative framework considers semi-parliamentary as a sort of conceptual opposite to semi-presidentialism, where under semi-presidential, the president forms the government and the legislature may dismiss, the opposite would be semi-parliamentary.

== See also ==
- List of countries by system of government
- List of political systems in France
- Parliamentary system
- Presidential system
- Semi-presidential system
