= Parliamentary system =

Form of government

World's states colored by systems of government: Parliamentary systems: Head of government is elected or nominated by and accountable to the legislature. Constitutional monarchy with a ceremonial monarch Semi-constitutional monarchy: Monarch holds significant executive or legislative power but is still restricted by the constitution. Parliamentary republic with a ceremonial president Parliamentary republic with an executive president Presidential system: Head of government (president) is popularly elected and independent of the legislature. Presidential republic Theocratic presidential republic: Supreme leader is highest authority; popularly elected president still exists. Hybrid systems: Semi-presidential republic: Executive president is independent of the legislature; head of government is appointed by the president and is accountable to the legislature. Assembly-independent republic: Head of government (president or directory) is elected by the legislature, but is not accountable to it. Other systems: Islamic theocracy: Supreme leader holds unlimited political and religious power; state and faith are a single institution. Absolute monarchy: Monarch has unlimited power. One-party state: Power is constitutionally linked to a single political party. Provisional government: Current regime is temporary or transitional; no permanent constitution. Military junta: Committee of military leaders controls the government; constitutional provisions are suspended. Places without governments. Note: this chart represents the de jure systems of government, not the de facto degree of democracy.

A parliamentary system is a form of government based on an executive branch dependent on the confidence of the legislative branch. In this system the head of government (chief executive) derives their democratic legitimacy from their ability to command the support ("confidence") of a majority of the parliament, to which they are held accountable. This head of government is usually, but not always, distinct from a ceremonial head of state. This is in contrast to a presidential or assembly-independent system, which features a president whose power is balanced against the legislature and the judiciary, and cannot be replaced by a simple majority vote.

Countries with parliamentary systems may be constitutional monarchies, where a monarch is the head of state, or parliamentary republics, where a mostly ceremonial president is the head of state, while the head of government, commonly referred to as prime minister, is almost always a member of parliament. In some countries, the head of government is also head of state but is elected by the legislature. In bicameral parliaments, the head of government is generally, though not always, a member of the lower house. Typically, the head of state in a parliamentary republic is elected by popular vote; however, in some cases they are elected by an electoral college (e.g. Germany) or by members of parliament (e.g. Italy) in a special process.

Parliamentary systems are the predominant form of government in the European Union, Oceania, and throughout the former British Empire, with other users scattered throughout Africa and Asia. A similar system, called a council–manager government, is used by many local governments in the United States.

== History ==
The first parliaments date back to Europe in the Middle Ages. The earliest example of a parliament is disputed, especially depending how the term is defined. For example, the Icelandic Althing consisting of prominent individuals among the free landowners of the various districts of the Icelandic Commonwealth first gathered around the year 930 (it conducted its business orally, with no written record allowing an exact date). The first written record of a parliament, in particular in the sense of an assembly separate from the population called in presence of a king was in 1188, when Alfonso IX of León convened the three states in the Cortes of León. The Corts of Catalonia were the first parliament of Europe that officially obtained the power to pass legislation, apart from the custom. An early example of parliamentary government also occurred in today's Netherlands and Belgium during the Dutch revolt (1581), when the sovereign, legislative and executive powers were taken over by the States General of the Netherlands from the monarch, King Philip II of Spain.

In England, Simon de Montfort is remembered as one of the figures relevant later for convening two famous parliaments. The first, in 1258, stripped the king of unlimited authority and the second, in 1265, included ordinary citizens from the towns. Later, in the 17th century, the Parliament of England pioneered some of the ideas and systems of liberal democracy culminating in the Glorious Revolution and passage of the Bill of Rights 1689. In the Kingdom of Great Britain, the monarch in theory chaired the cabinet and chose ministers. In practice, King George I's inability to speak English led to the responsibility for chairing cabinet to go to the leading minister, literally the prime or first minister, Robert Walpole. The gradual democratisation of Parliament with the broadening of the voting franchise increased Parliament's role in controlling government, and in deciding whom the king could ask to form a government. By the 19th century, the Great Reform Act 1832 led to parliamentary dominance, with its choice deciding who was prime minister and the complexion of the government.

Other countries gradually adopted what came to be called the Westminster system of government, with an executive answerable to the lower house of a bicameral parliament, and exercising, in the name of the head of state, powers nominally vested in the head of state – hence the use of phrases such as His Majesty's government (in constitutional monarchies) or His Excellency's government (in parliamentary republics). The British government initially resisted calls for the implementation of parliamentary democracy and what reformers in Upper Canada called responsible government in its colonies, preferring a colonial executive accountable to the British government rather than to the local population. This led to the Rebellions of 1837–1838 in Upper and Lower Canada, and after the rebellions, reformers continued to advocate for responsible government in the the United Canadas and Nova Scotia. In 1846, the British government instructed its governors to allow the implementation of responsible government in those provinces. Afterwards, the same system was implemented in a variety of other British dominions, such as Australia, New Zealand, the Irish Free State and the Union of South Africa. Some of these parliaments were reformed from, or were initially developed as distinct from their original British model: the Australian Senate, for instance, has since its inception more closely reflected the U.S. Senate than the British House of Lords. Some of these countries, such as Trinidad and Tobago and Barbados, have severed institutional ties to Great Britain by becoming republics with their own ceremonial presidents, but still retaining the Westminster system. The idea of parliamentary accountability and responsible government spread with these systems.

Democracy and parliamentarianism became increasingly prevalent in Europe in the years after World War I. This was partially imposed by the occupation and later the laws made by democratic victors—the U.S., Great Britain and France—on the defeated countries and their successors, notably Germany's Weimar Republic and the First Austrian Republic. Nineteenth-century urbanisation, the Industrial Revolution and modernism had already made the parliamentarist demands of the radicals and the emerging movement of social democrats increasingly difficult to ignore; these forces came to dominate many states that transitioned to parliamentarism, particularly in the French Third Republic where the Radical Party and its centre-left allies dominated the government for several decades. The rise of fascism in the 1930s put an end to parliamentary democracy in Italy and Germany, among others. After the World War II, the defeated Axis powers were occupied by the victorious Allies. In those countries occupied by the Allied democracies (the United States, United Kingdom, and France) parliamentary constitutions were implemented, resulting in the Constitutions of Italy, Germany, and Japan. The experiences of the war in the occupied nations where the legitimate democratic governments were allowed to return strengthened the public commitment to parliamentary principles; in Denmark, a new constitution was written in 1953, while a long and acrimonious debate in Norway resulted in no changes being made to the Constitution of Norway, a strongly entrenched democratic constitution.

== Characteristics ==
A parliamentary system may be either bicameral, with two chambers of parliament (or houses) or unicameral, with just one parliamentary chamber. A bicameral parliament usually consists of a directly elected lower house with the power to determine the executive government, and an upper house which may be appointed or elected through a different mechanism from the lower house. A 2019 peer-reviewed meta-analysis based on 1,037 regressions in 46 studies finds that presidential systems generally seem to favor revenue cuts, while parliamentary systems would rely more on fiscal expansion characterized by a higher level of spending before an election.

=== Types ===
Scholars of democracy such as Arend Lijphart distinguish two types of parliamentary democracies: the Westminster and Consensus systems. Other variations exist, which scholars occasionally treat as variations of parliamentary systems, hybrids or sui generis forms of government. Sartori observes: "The fact is that 'parliamentarism' does not denote a single entity. If the performances of parliamentary systems are as different as they are, this is because they relate to, and result from, very different kinds of executive-legislative linkage. Indeed, there are at least three major varieties of parliamentary systems: at one extreme the English-type of premiership or cabinet system, in which the executive forcefully prevails over parliament; at the other extreme the French (III and IV Republic) type of assembly government that makes governing a near-impossibility; and a middle-of-the-way formula of party-controlled parliamentarism."

==== Westminster system ====
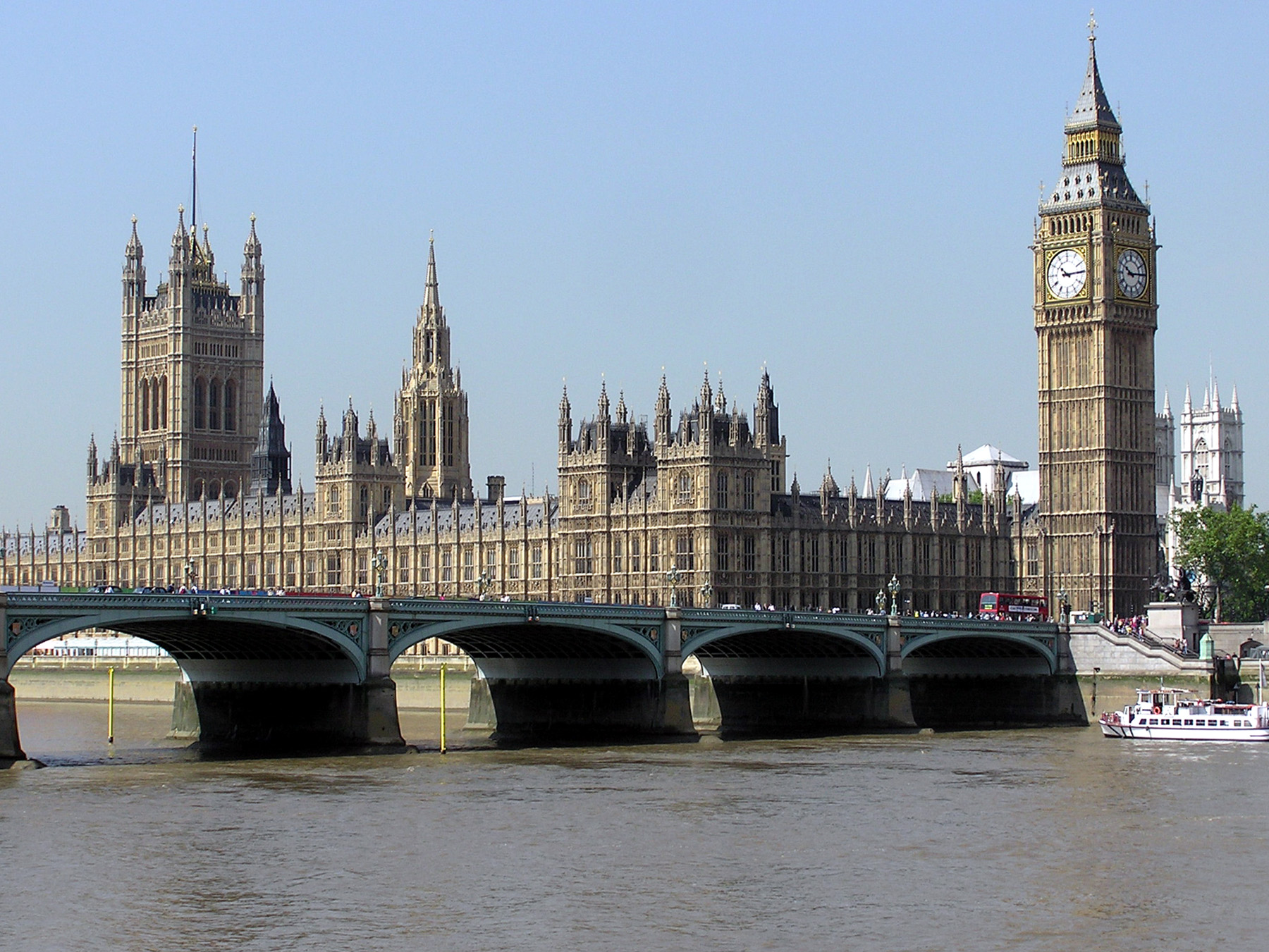
The Palace of Westminster in London, United Kingdom. The Westminster system originates from the British Houses of Parliament.

The Westminster system is usually found in the Commonwealth of Nations and countries which were influenced by the British political tradition. These parliaments tend to have a more adversarial style of debate, the plenary session of parliament is more important than committees, and the parliamentary agenda is controlled by the government through the person of the Leader of the House. Some parliaments in this model are elected using a plurality voting system, such as the United Kingdom, Canada, India and Malaysia, while others use some form of proportional representation, such as Ireland and New Zealand. The Australian House of Representatives (which deviates much from the Westminster system, being described as semi-parliamentary or a 'Washminster' hybrid) is elected using instant-runoff voting, while the Senate is elected using proportional representation through single transferable vote. Regardless of which system is used, the voting systems tend to allow the voter to vote candidates. Most Westminster systems employ strict monism, where ministers must be members of parliament simultaneously; while some Westminster systems, such as Bangladesh, permit the appointment of extra-parliamentary ministers, and others (such as Jamaica) allow outsiders to be appointed to the ministry through an appointed upper house, although a majority of ministers (which, by necessity, includes the prime minister) must come from within (the lower house of) the parliament.

In these systems, the executive uses the cabinet model, where the prime minister is "first above unequals"

==== More consensusal systems ====
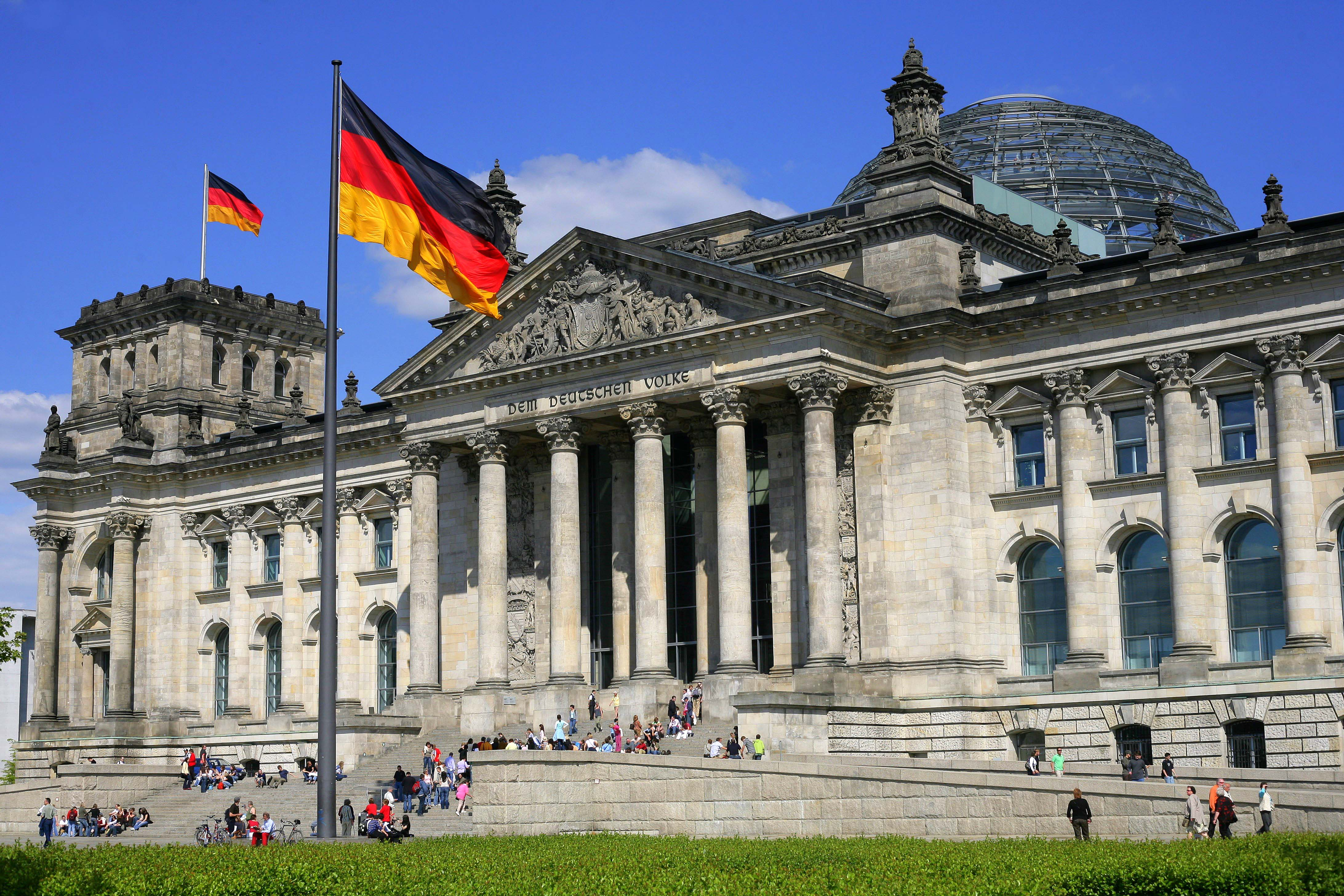
The Reichstag Building in Berlin, Germany. The Consensus system is used in most Western European countries.

The Western European parliamentary models (e.g., Spain, Germany) tend to have a more consensual debating system and usually has semi-circular debating chambers. Consensus systems have more of a tendency to use proportional representation with open party lists than the Westminster Model legislatures. The committees of these parliaments tend to be more important than the plenary chamber, and the parliamentary agenda is controlled by its own organs such as the Presidium, Conference of Presidents, or Council of Elders. Most Western European countries do not employ strict monism, and allow extra-parliamentary ministers as a matter of course. The Netherlands, Slovakia and Sweden outright implement the principle of dualism, where Members of Parliament have to resign their place in Parliament upon being appointed (or elected) minister, as a form of separation of powers.

In these systems the executive, being usually a coalition government, uses either a chancellor model or a council of ministers model, where the prime minister is "first among unequals" or "first among equals" respectively.

=== Atypical parliamentary systems ===
The semi-presidential system is the most common variant of the parliamentary system. Widely adopted after the 1950s, it is modelled after the Fifth Republic of France. The French model (termed "premier-presidential") retains the principle that the cabinet is de jure only politically responsible to parliament, however by also placing the president of the republic in the executive, who, unlike the prime minister, is not subject to parliamentary confidence (dual executive) it creates a hybrid of presidential and parliamentary models. Another model of semi-presidentialism is the "president-parliamentary" model, where the prime-minister and cabinet may also be dismissed be the president. Semi-presidential countries pose a challenge to political scientists as practice often differs from constitutional text. For example the French Republic is considered more presidentialized (president-parliamentary) in practice as presidents have been able to dismiss prime ministers at will.

In the semi-parliamentary system, the legislature is split into two parts that are both directly elected, but only one has the power to select and remove the members of the executive by a vote of no confidence. This exists in Australia and Japan.

In the (elected) prime-ministerial system voters vote for both members of legislature and the prime minister. It is possible under a constitutional monarchy, but has only existed in republics.

A parliamentary republic with an executive presidency is a form of parliamentary republic in which the executive derives its democratic legitimacy from its ability to command the confidence of the legislature to which it is held accountable, but is characterized by a combined head of state–head of government office in the form of an executive president who carries out both functions.

=== Appointment of the head of government ===
Implementations of the parliamentary system can also differ as to how the prime minister and government are appointed and whether the government needs the explicit approval of the parliament, rather than just the absence of its disapproval. While many parliamentary systems such as India require the prime minister to be a member of the legislature, in other countries like Canada and the United Kingdom this only exists as a convention, some other countries including Norway, Sweden and the Benelux countries require a sitting member of the legislature to resign such positions upon being appointed to the executive. In a few countries, such as Italy and Austria, technocratic cabinets made of nonpartisan experts are sometimes formed in case parliament is so deadlocked that no party-political government can be formed.

- The head of state appoints a prime minister who will likely have majority support in parliament. While in the majority of cases prime ministers in the Westminster system are the leaders of the largest party in parliament, technically the appointment of the prime minister is a prerogative exercised by the head of state (be it the monarch, the governor-general, or the president). This system is used in:
  - Australia
  - Canada
  - India
  - Jamaica
  - Malaysia
  - New Zealand
  - United Kingdom
  - Portugal
  - Czech Republic
  - Poland
- The head of state appoints a prime minister who must gain a vote of confidence within a set time. This system is used in:
  - Italy
- The head of state appoints the leader of the political party holding a plurality of seats in parliament as prime minister. For example, in Greece, if no party has a majority, the leader of the party with a plurality of seats is given an exploratory mandate to receive the confidence of the parliament within three days. If said leader fails to obtain the confidence of parliament, then the leader of the second-largest party is given the exploratory mandate. If that fails, then the leader of the third-largest political party is given the exploratory mandate, and so on. This system is used in:
  - Greece
- The head of state nominates a candidate for prime minister who then tries to form a government that doesn't have a majority against them in parliament. In practice all leaders of political parties meets with the head of state and secretly nominates favorite candidates, and who they would reject. If one candidate fails for form a government another may be appointed, or a new election called.
  - Denmark
- The head of state nominates a candidate for prime minister who is then submitted to parliament for approval before appointment. Example: Spain, where the King sends a proposal to the Congress of Deputies for approval. Also, Germany where under the German Basic Law (constitution) the Bundestag votes on a candidate nominated by the federal president. In these cases, parliament can choose another candidate who then would be appointed by the head of state. This system is used in:
  - Estonia
  - Germany
  - Spain
- Parliament nominates a candidate whom the head of state is constitutionally obliged to appoint as prime minister. Example: Japan, where the Emperor appoints the Prime Minister on the nomination of the National Diet. Also Ireland, where the President of Ireland appoints the Taoiseach on the nomination of Dáil Éireann. Also Thailand, where the Monarch appoints the Prime Minister on the nomination of House of Representatives. This system is used in:
  - Ireland
  - Japan
  - Thailand
- A public officeholder (other than the head of state or their representative) nominates a candidate, who, if approved by parliament, is appointed as prime minister. Example: Under the Swedish Instrument of Government (1974), the power to appoint someone to form a government has been moved from the monarch to the Speaker of Parliament and the parliament itself. The speaker nominates a candidate, who is then elected to prime minister (statsminister) by the parliament if an absolute majority of the members of parliament does not vote against the candidate (i.e. they can be elected even if more members of parliament vote No than Yes). This system is used in:
  - Sweden
- Direct election by popular vote. Example: Israel, 1996–2001, where the prime minister was elected in a general election, with no regard to political affiliation, and whose procedure can also be described as an elected prime-ministerial system. This system was used in:
  - Israel (1996–2001)

=== Head of state ===
Parliamentary systems also vary in how the head of state is elected or selected. Parliamentary monarchies operate under hereditary succession. Parliamentary republics most commonly elect the head of state directly by popular vote, typically via a two-round system, therefore a majority or plurality principle.

- The head of state is elected directly, usually via a two-round system, rarely by first-past-the-post voting. This system is used in:
  - Austria
  - Croatia
  - Czech Republic
  - Finland
  - Iceland
  - Ireland
  - Poland
  - Portugal
  - Slovakia
  - Slovenia
- The head of state is a constitutional monarch. This system is used in:
  - Australia
  - Canada
  - Denmark
  - Jamaica
  - Japan
  - Malaysia
  - New Zealand
  - Spain
  - Sweden
  - United Kingdom
- The head of state is elected by members of parliament under a special voting procedure. This usually involves supermajority rules in the first rounds, and simple majority rule in subsequent rounds. This system is used in:
  - Italy
  - Greece
- The head of state is elected by an electoral college, as special assembly for electing the president.
  - Republic of China (1947–1996)
  - Estonia
  - Germany
  - India

=== Power of dissolution and call for election ===
Furthermore, there are variations as to what conditions exist (if any) for the government to have the right to dissolve the parliament:

- In some countries, especially those operating under a Westminster system, such as the United Kingdom, Denmark, Malaysia, Australia and New Zealand, the prime minister has the de facto power to call an election, at will. In Spain, the prime minister is the only person with the de jure power to call an election, granted by Article 115 of the Constitution.
- In Israel, parliament may vote to dissolve itself in order to call an election, or the prime minister may call a snap election with presidential consent if his government is deadlocked. A non-passage of the budget automatically calls a snap election.
- Other countries only permit an election to be called in the event of a vote of no confidence against the government, a supermajority vote in favour of an early election or a prolonged deadlock in parliament. These requirements can still be circumvented. For example, in Germany in 2005, Gerhard Schröder deliberately allowed his government to lose a confidence motion, in order to call an early election.
- In Sweden, the government may call a snap election at will, but the newly elected Riksdag is only elected to fill out the previous Riksdag's term. The last time this option was used was in 1958.
- In Greece, before 2019, a general election was called if the Parliament failed to elect a new head of state when his or her term ended. In January 2015, this constitutional provision was exploited by Syriza to trigger a snap election, win it and oust rivals New Democracy from power. After the 2019 constitutional revision, the election of the President can no longer trigger a general election.
- In Italy the government has no power to call a snap election. A snap election can only be called by the head of state, following a consultation with the presidents of both houses of parliament.
- Norway is unique among parliamentary systems in that the Storting always serves the whole of its four-year term. In the event of a vote of no confidence, neither the head of state nor the outgoing prime minister has the legal authority to call a snap election.
- In Australia, under certain, unique conditions, the prime minister can request the Governor General to call for a double dissolution, whereby all rather than only half of the Senate, is dissolved – in effect electing all of the Parliament simultaneously.

The parliamentary system can be contrasted with a presidential system which operates under a stricter separation of powers, whereby the executive does not form part of—nor is appointed by—the parliamentary or legislative body. In such a system, parliaments or congresses do not select or dismiss heads of government, and governments cannot request an early dissolution as may be the case for parliaments (although the parliament may still be able to dissolve itself, as in the case of Cyprus). There also exists the semi-presidential system that draws on both presidential systems and parliamentary systems by combining a powerful president with an executive responsible to parliament: for example, the French Fifth Republic.

Parliamentarianism may also apply to regional and local governments. An example is Oslo which has an executive council (Byråd) as a part of the parliamentary system. The devolved nations of the United Kingdom are also parliamentary and which, as with the UK Parliament, may hold early elections – this has only occurred with regards to the Northern Ireland Assembly in 2017 and 2022.

=== Anti-defection law ===
A few parliamentary democratic nations such as India, Pakistan and Bangladesh have enacted laws that prohibit floor crossing or switching parties after the election. Under these laws, elected representatives will lose their seat in the parliament if they go against their party in votes.

In the UK parliament, a member is free to cross over to a different party. In Canada and Australia, there are no restraints on legislators switching sides. In New Zealand, waka-jumping legislation provides that MPs who switch parties or are expelled from their party may be expelled from Parliament at the request of their former party's leader.

=== Parliamentary sovereignty ===
A few parliamentary democracies such as the United Kingdom and New Zealand have weak or non-existent checks on the legislative power of their Parliaments, where any newly approved Act shall take precedence over all prior Acts. All laws are equally unentrenched, wherein judicial review may not outright annul nor amend them, as frequently occurs in other parliamentary systems like Germany. Whilst the head of state for both nations (Monarch, and or Governor General) has the de jure power to withhold assent to any bill passed by their Parliament, this check has not been exercised in Britain since the 1708 Scottish Militia Bill.

Whilst both the UK and New Zealand have some Acts or parliamentary rules establishing supermajorities or additional legislative procedures for certain legislation, such as previously with the Fixed-term Parliaments Act 2011 (FTPA), these can be bypassed through the enactment of another that amends or ignores these supermajorities away, such as with the Early Parliamentary General Election Act 2019 – bypassing the 2/3rd supermajority required for an early dissolution under the FTPA -, which enabled the early dissolution for the 2019 general election.

=== Metrics ===
Parliamentarism metrics allow a quantitative comparison of the strength of parliamentary systems for individual countries. One parliamentarism metric is the Parliamentary Powers Index.

== Advantages ==
=== Adaptability ===
Parliamentary systems are considered by some to be more flexible than systems in countries like the United States. According to American political scientist R. Kent Weaver, parliamentary systems allow rapid changes in legislation and policy as long as there is a stable majority or coalition in parliament, allowing the government to have fewer limits on what they are capable of. This is compared to the a presidential system, where a system of checks and balances slows and limits the legislature's and executive's power. According to Weaver, the fusion of powers system allows parliaments to innovate faster.

=== Scrutiny and accountability ===
The fused power system is sometimes noted to be advantageous with regard to accountability. The centralised government can allow for more transparency as to where decisions originate from, constrasting the American system with former U.S. Treasury Secretary C. Douglas Dillon saying "the president blames Congress, the Congress blames the president, and the public remains confused and disgusted with government in Washington".

=== Distribution of power ===
A 2001 World Bank study found that parliamentary systems are associated with less corruption.

=== Calling of elections ===
In his 1867 book The English Constitution, Walter Bagehot praised parliamentary governments for producing serious debates, for allowing for a change in power without an election, and for allowing elections at any time. Bagehot considered fixed-term elections such as the four-year election rule for the president of the United States to be unnatural, as it can potentially allow a president who has disappointed the public early in their term to continue on until the end of their four-year term. Under a parliamentary system, a prime minister that has lost support in the middle of their term can be easily replaced by their own peers with a more popular alternative, as the Conservative Party in the UK did with successive prime ministers David Cameron, Theresa May, Boris Johnson, Liz Truss, and Rishi Sunak.

Although Bagehot praised parliamentary governments for allowing an election to take place at any time, the lack of a definite election calendar can be abused. Under some systems, such as the British, a ruling party can schedule elections when it believes that it is likely to retain power, so it may avoid elections at times of unpopularity. (Note: From 2011, election timing in the UK was partially fixed under the Fixed-term Parliaments Act 2011, which was repealed by the Dissolution and Calling of Parliament Act 2022.) Thus, by timing elections, in the UK's system, a party can extend its rule for longer than is feasible in a presidential system. This problem can be alleviated somewhat by setting fixed dates for parliamentary elections, as is the case in several of Australia's state parliaments, and more thoroughly by setting that the new parliament would only serve for the remaining part of the dissolved parliament's term, as is the case in Sweden. In other systems, such as the Dutch and the Belgian, the ruling party or coalition has some flexibility in determining the election date. Conversely, flexibility in the timing of parliamentary elections can avoid periods of legislative gridlock that can occur in a fixed period presidential system.

== Disadvantages ==
=== Incomplete separation of powers ===
According to Arturo Fontaine, parliamentary systems in Europe have yielded very powerful heads of government; this possibility is a common criticism of presidential rather than parliamentary systems. Fontaine compares United Kingdom's Margaret Thatcher to the United States' Ronald Reagan, noting that Thatcher was much more powerful despite governing under a parliamentary system. The rise to power of Viktor Orbán in Hungary has been used as an example to show how parliamentary systems can be subverted. The situation in Hungary was, according to Fontaine, allowed by the deficient separation of powers that characterises parliamentary and semi-presidential systems. Once Fidesz, Orbán's party, received two-thirds of the seats in Parliament in a single election, a supermajority large enough to amend the Hungarian constitution, there was no institution that was able to balance the concentration of power. In a presidential system, at least two separate elections would be required to create the same effect: the presidential and legislative elections. Furthermore, the president's party would have to possess the legislative supermajority required for constitutional amendments. Safeguards against this situation implementable in both systems include the establishment of an upper house or a requirement, such as a referendum, for external ratification of constitutional amendments. As a warning example of the flaws of parliamentary systems, Fontaine also notes that if the United States had a parliamentary system, Donald Trump, as head of government, could have dissolved the U.S. Congress.

=== Legislative flip-flopping ===
The ability for strong parliamentary governments to push legislation through with the ease of fused power systems such as in the United Kingdom, whilst positive in allowing rapid adaptation when necessary e.g. the nationalisation of services during the world wars, in the opinion of some commentators does have its drawbacks. For instance, the flip-flopping of legislation back and forth as the majority in parliament changed between the Conservatives and Labour over the period 1940–1980, contesting over the nationalisation and privatisation of the British Steel Industry resulted in major instability for the British steel sector.

=== Political fragmentation ===
Weaver writes in Are Parliamentary Systems Better? that an advantage of presidential systems is their ability to allow and accommodate more diverse viewpoints. He states that because "legislators are not compelled to vote against their constituents on matters of local concern, parties can serve as organizational and roll-call cuing vehicles without forcing out dissidents".

=== Democratic unaccountability ===
Most parliamentary democracies see the indirect election or appointment of their head of government. As a result, the electorate has limited power to remove or install the person or party wielding the most power. Although strategic voting may enable the party of the prime minister to be removed or empowered, this can be at the expense of voters first preferences in the many parliamentary systems utilising first past the post, or having no effect in dislodging those parties who consistently form part of a coalition government, as with then Dutch prime minister Mark Rutte and his party the VVD's 4 terms in office, despite their peak support reaching only 26.6% in 2012. A more salient example is the 2023 Berlin state election, where the outgoing Red–red–green coalition retained an absolute majority, and it initially appeared likely that the CDU, despite its significant growth relative to the previous election in 2021, would remain in opposition.

== Countries ==
=== Africa ===
Country	Connection between the legislature and the executive
Botswana	Parliament of Botswana elects the President who appoints the Cabinet
Ethiopia	Federal Parliamentary Assembly appoints the Council of Ministers
Lesotho	National Assembly of Lesotho determines the Prime Minister of Lesotho
Mauritius	National Assembly appoints the Cabinet of Mauritius
Somalia	Federal Parliament of Somalia elects the President who appoints the Prime Minister
South Africa	Parliament of South Africa elects the President who appoints the Cabinet
Togo	National Assembly elects the President who appoints the Prime Minister

=== Americas ===
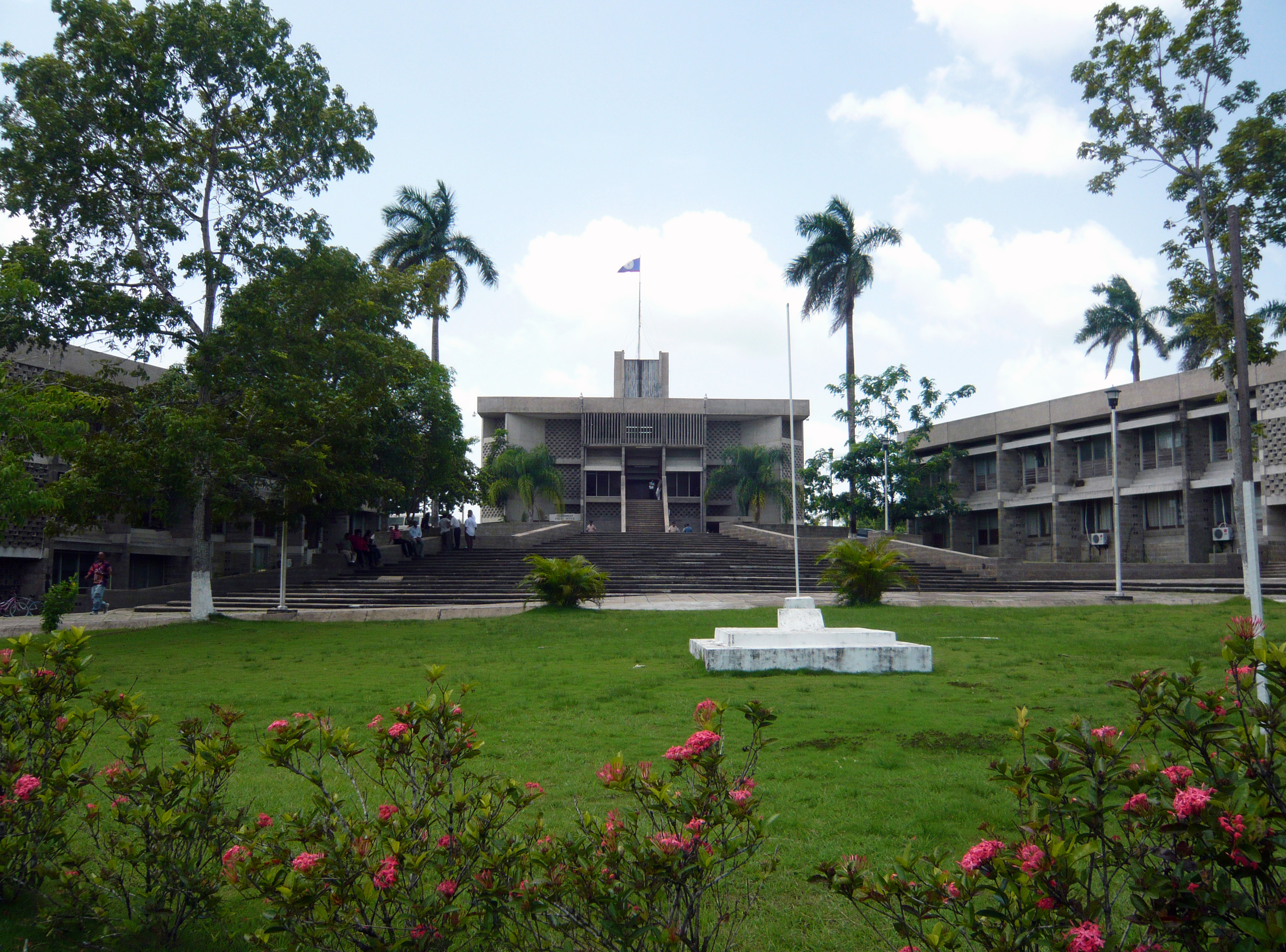
House of Representatives of Belize

Parliament of Canada

Country	Connection between the legislature and the executive
Antigua and Barbuda	Leader of the political party that has the support of a majority in the House of Representatives of Antigua and Barbuda is appointed Prime Minister of Antigua and Barbuda by the Governor-General of Antigua and Barbuda, who then appoints the Cabinet of Antigua and Barbuda on the advice of the Prime Minister
The Bahamas	Leader of the political party that has the support of a majority in the House of Assembly of the Bahamas is appointed Prime Minister of the Bahamas by the Governor-General of the Bahamas, who then appoints the Cabinet of the Bahamas on the advice of the Prime Minister
Barbados	Leader of the political party that has the support of a majority in the House of Assembly of Barbados is appointed Prime Minister of Barbados by the President of Barbados, who then appoints the Cabinet of Barbados on the advice of the Prime Minister
Belize	Leader of the political party that has the support of a majority in the House of Representatives of Belize is appointed Prime Minister of Belize by the Governor-General of Belize, who then appoints the Cabinet of Belize on the advice of the Prime Minister
Canada	Leader of the political party that has the support of a majority in the House of Commons of Canada is appointed Prime Minister of Canada by the Governor General of Canada, who then appoints the Cabinet of Canada on the advice of the Prime Minister
Dominica	Parliament approves the Cabinet of Dominica
Grenada	Leader of the political party that has the support of a majority in the House of Representatives of Grenada is appointed Prime Minister of Grenada by the Governor-General of Grenada, who then appoints the Cabinet of Grenada on the advice of the Prime Minister
Jamaica	Leader of the political party that has the support of a majority in the House of Representatives of Jamaica is appointed Prime Minister of Jamaica by the Governor-General of Jamaica, who then appoints the Cabinet of Jamaica on the advice of the Prime Minister
Saint Kitts and Nevis	Leader of the political party that has the support of a majority in the National Assembly of Saint Kitts and Nevis is appointed Prime Minister of Saint Kitts and Nevis by the Governor-General of Saint Kitts and Nevis, who then appoints the Cabinet of Saint Kitts and Nevis on the advice of the Prime Minister
Saint Lucia	Leader of the political party that has the support of a majority in the House of Assembly of Saint Lucia is appointed Prime Minister of Saint Lucia by the Governor-General of Saint Lucia, who then appoints the Cabinet of Saint Lucia on the advice of the Prime Minister
Saint Vincent and the Grenadines	Leader of the political party that has the support of a majority in the House of Assembly of Saint Vincent and the Grenadines is appointed Prime Minister of Saint Vincent and the Grenadines by the Governor-General of Saint Vincent and the Grenadines, who then appoints the Cabinet of Saint Vincent and the Grenadines on the advice of the Prime Minister
Suriname	National Assembly elects the President, who appoints the Cabinet of Suriname
Trinidad and Tobago	Leader of the political party that has the support of a majority in the House of Representatives of Trinidad and Tobago is appointed Prime Minister of Trinidad and Tobago by the President of Trinidad and Tobago, who then appoints the Cabinet of Trinidad and Tobago on the advice of the Prime Minister

=== Asia ===
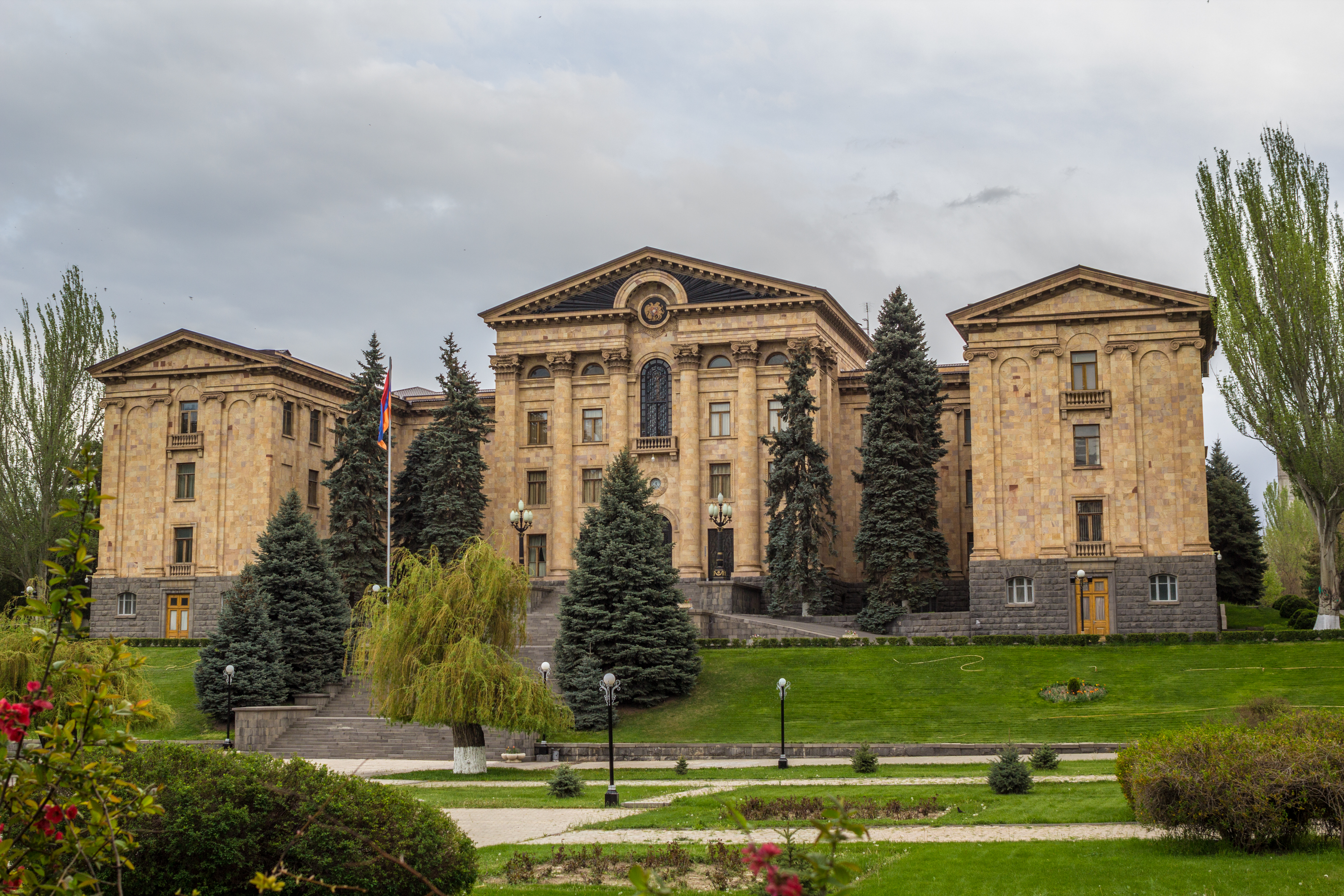
National Assembly of Armenia

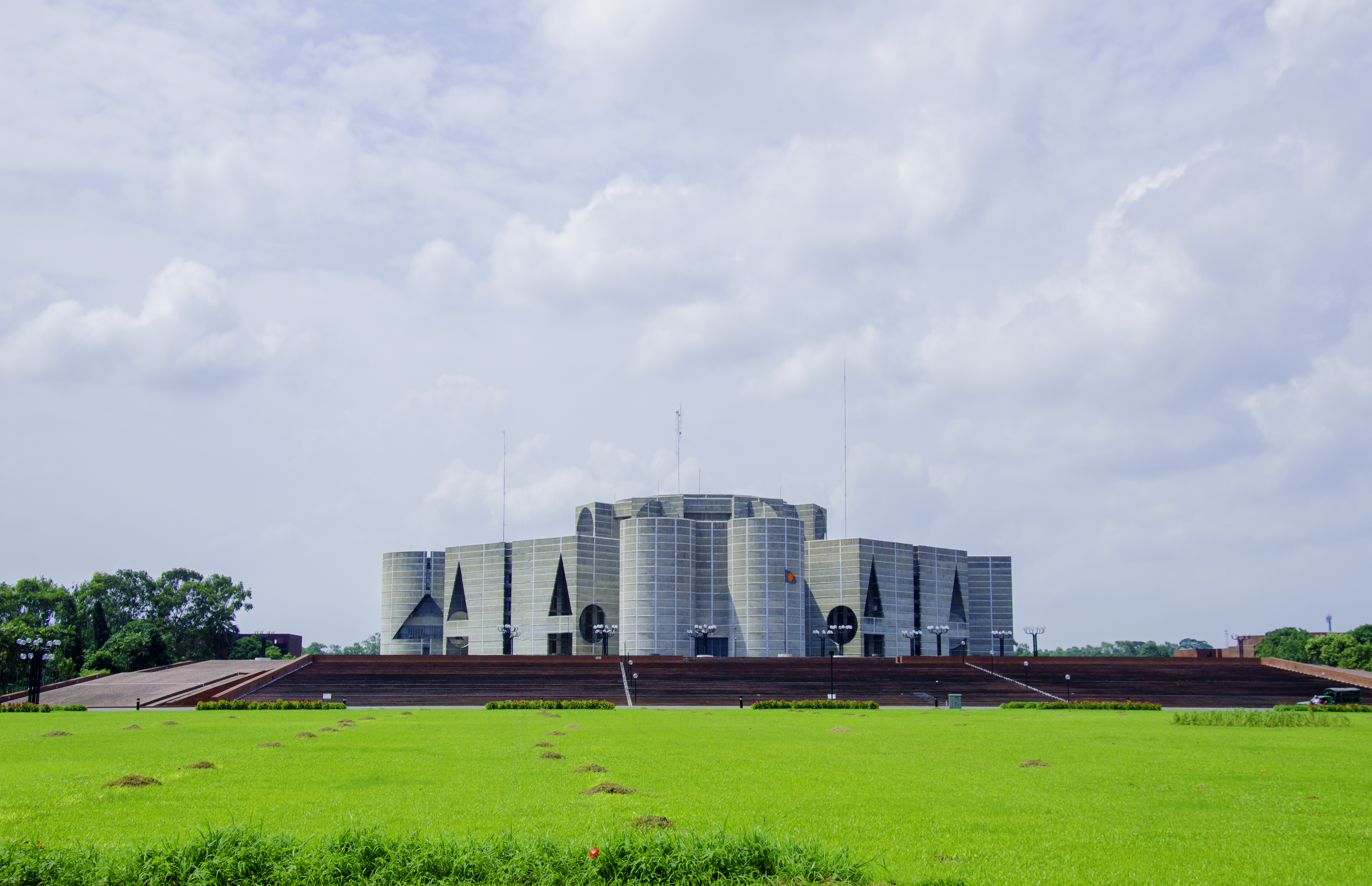
Jatiya Sangsad Bhaban, parliament building of Bangladesh

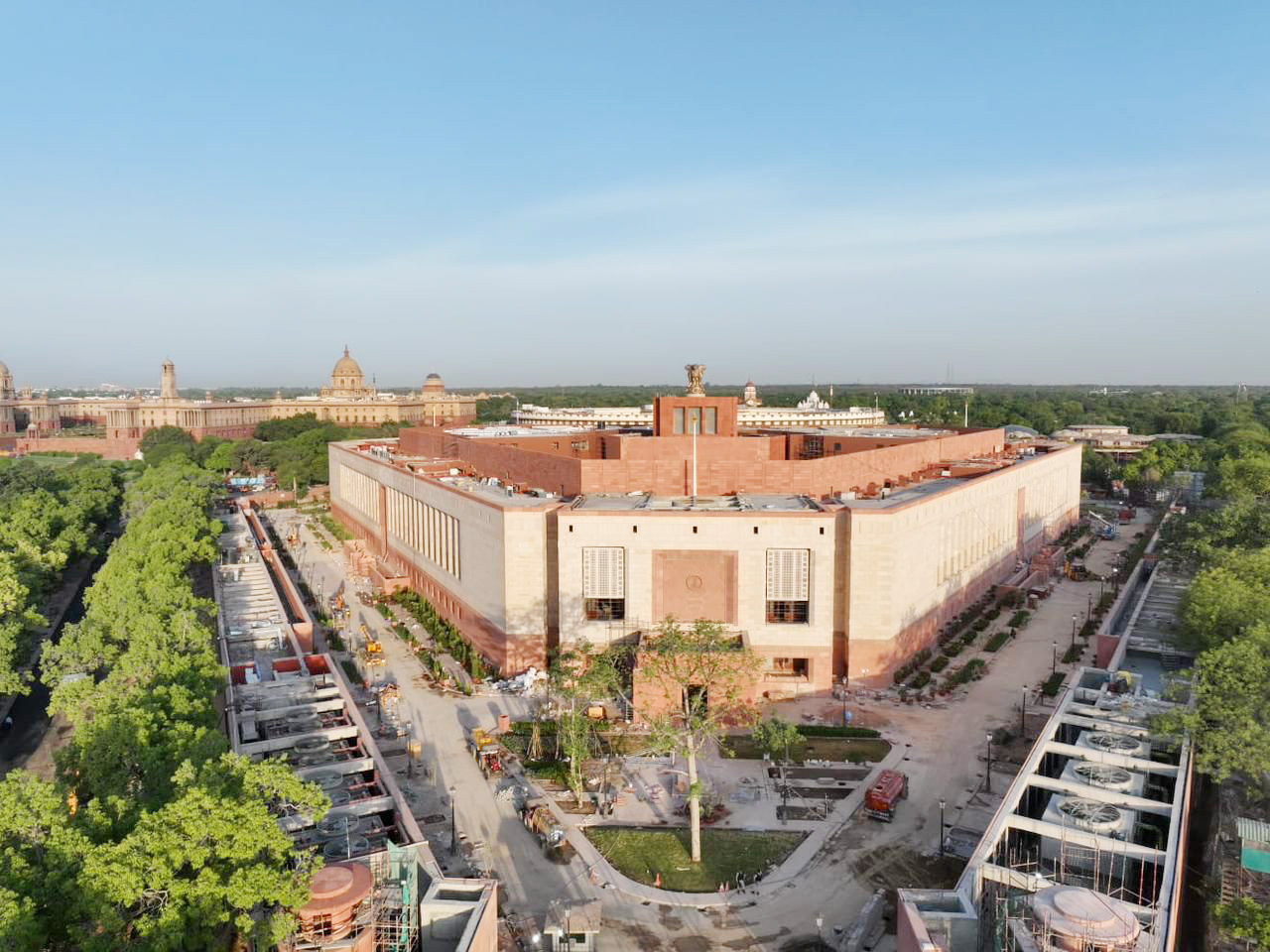
Sansad Bhavan, parliament building of India

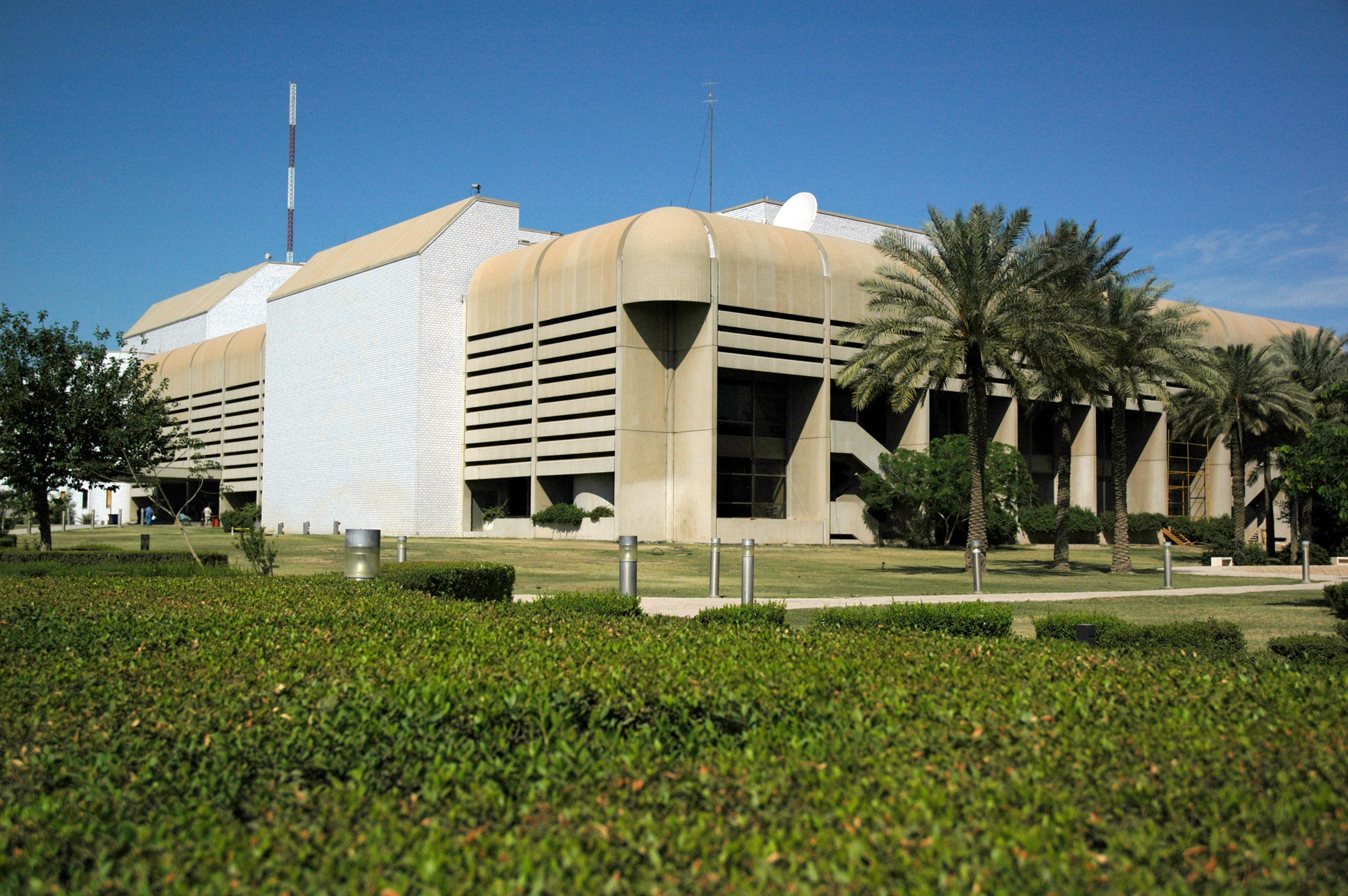
Council of Representatives of Iraq

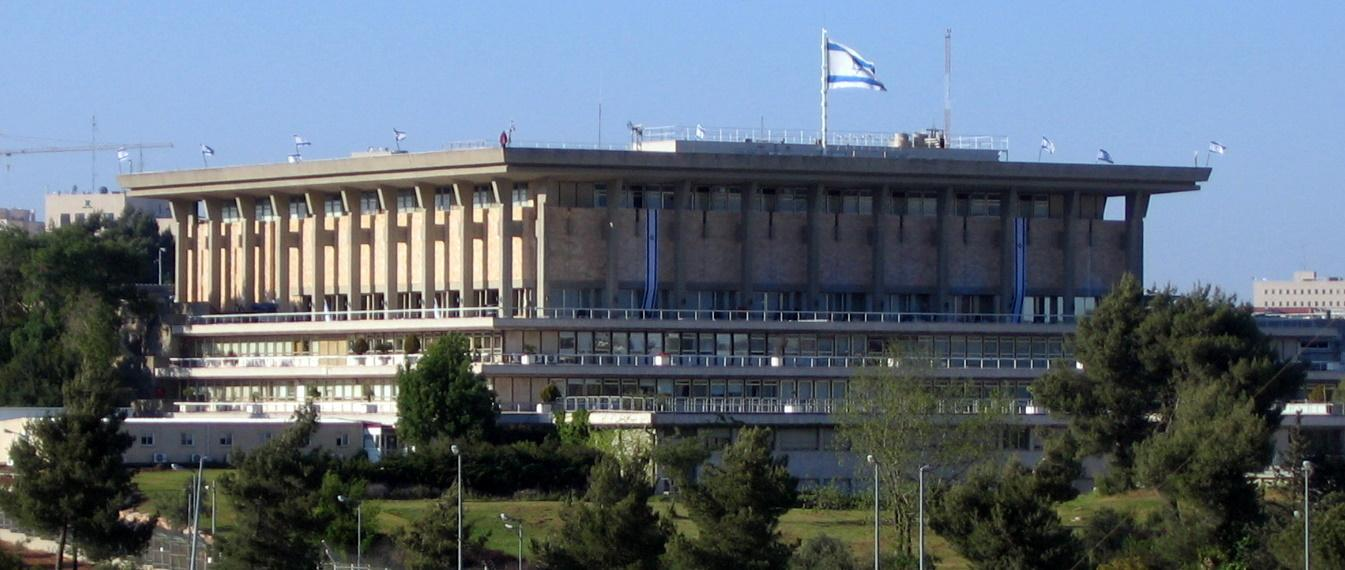
Knesset of Israel in Jerusalem

Parliament of Malaysia

Country	Connection between the legislature and the executive
Armenia	National Assembly appoints and (no sooner than one year) can dismiss through the constructive vote of no confidence the Government of Armenia
Bangladesh	Jatiya Sangsad approves the Cabinet of Bangladesh
Bhutan	Parliament of Bhutan approves the Lhengye Zhungtshog
Cambodia	Parliament of Cambodia approves the Council of Ministers
Republic of China (Taiwan)	1947 Constitution: The Legislative Yuan approves the Executive Yuan in which the premier is nominated and appointed by the president, with the consent of the Legislative Yuan.; 2005 Amendments: The Legislative Yuan approves the Executive Yuan in which the premier is appointed by the president. The Legislative Yuan may vote for motion of no confidence.
Georgia	The Prime Minister is nominated by a political party that has secured the best results in the parliamentary election. The nominee must be approved by the Parliament and formally by the President. The Prime Minister then appoints the Cabinet of Ministers.
India	President of India appoints the leader of the political party or alliance that has the support of a majority in the Lok Sabha as Prime Minister of India, who then forms the Union Council of Ministers
Iraq	Council of Representatives approves the Cabinet of Iraq
Israel	A member of the Knesset that has the best chance of forming a coalition is given a mandate to do so by the President of Israel. On success, they are appointed as the Prime Minister of Israel. The Prime Minister then appoints the Cabinet of Israel.
Japan	National Diet nominates the Prime Minister who appoints the Cabinet of Japan
Kuwait	National Assembly approves the Crown Prince who appoints the Prime Minister who appoints the Cabinet of Kuwait
Laos	National Assembly elects the President who nominates the Prime Minister
Lebanon	Maronite Christian president is elected by the Parliament of Lebanon. He appoints the Prime Minister (a Sunni Muslim) and the cabinet. The Parliament thereafter approves the Cabinet of Lebanon through a vote of confidence (a simple majority).
Malaysia	Leader of the political party that has the support of a majority in the Dewan Rakyat is appointed Prime Minister of Malaysia by the Yang di-Pertuan Agong, who then appoints the Cabinet of Malaysia on the advice of the Prime Minister.
Myanmar	Assembly of the Union, by an electoral college, elects the President who forms the Cabinet of Myanmar. However, Myanmar is currently under the rule of the State Administration Council, which assumed power by coup d'état
Nepal	Parliament of Nepal elects the Prime Minister who, by turn, appoints the Cabinet of Nepal
Pakistan	Parliament of Pakistan elects the Prime Minister of Pakistan who has majority support of members of National Assembly of Pakistan. Cabinet of Pakistan is appointed by President of Pakistan on advice of Prime Minister.
Singapore	Leader of the political party that has the support of a majority in the Parliament of Singapore is appointed Prime Minister of Singapore by the President of Singapore, who then appoints the Cabinet of Singapore on the advice of the Prime Minister.
Thailand	The Monarch appoints the MP or individual nominated by in the House of Representatives (usually the leader of the largest party or coalition) as Prime Minister, who forms the Cabinet of Thailand.
Vietnam	National Assembly elects the President and Prime Minister who forms the Cabinet.

=== Europe ===
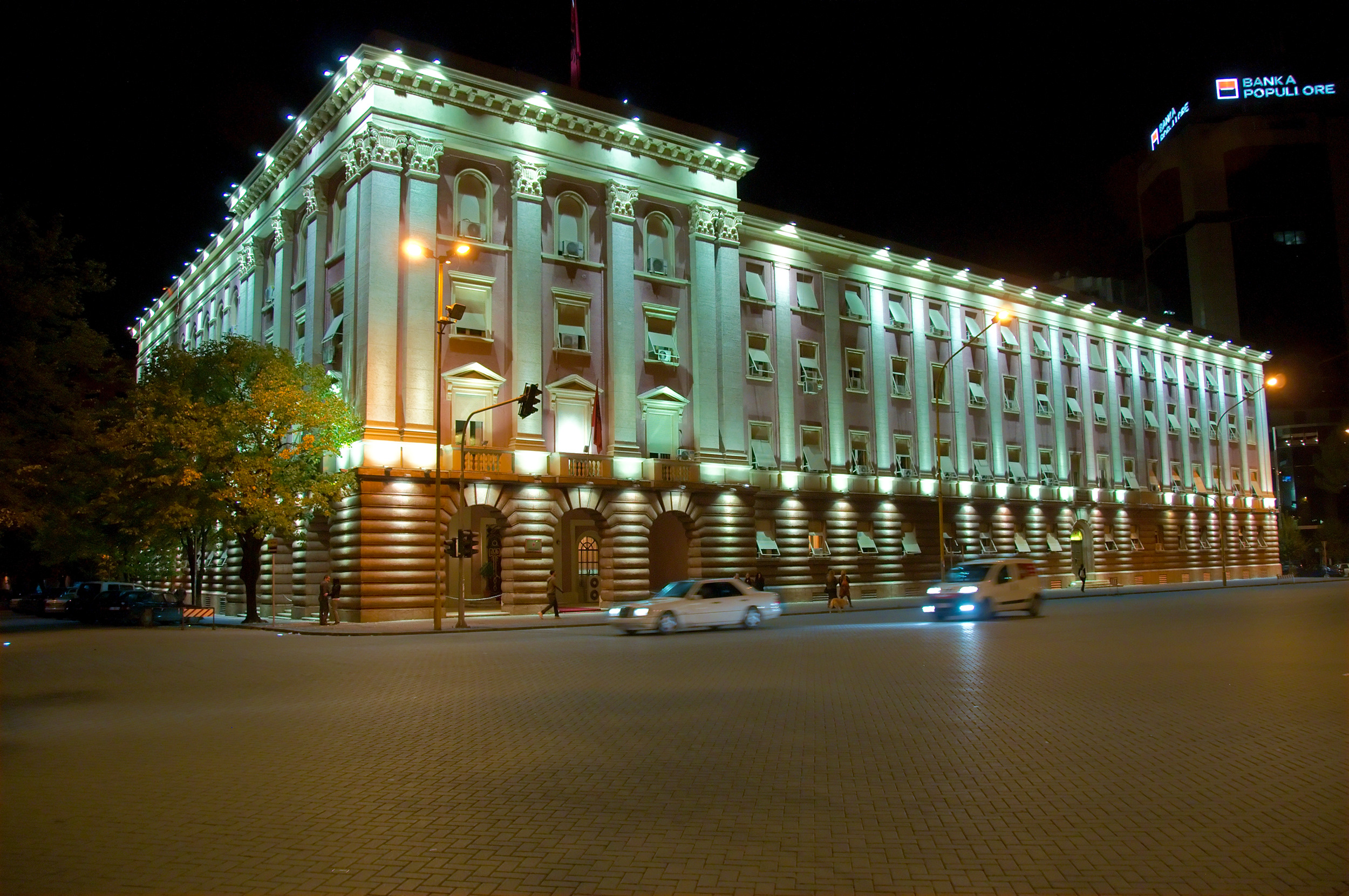
The administrative building of the Albanian Parliament

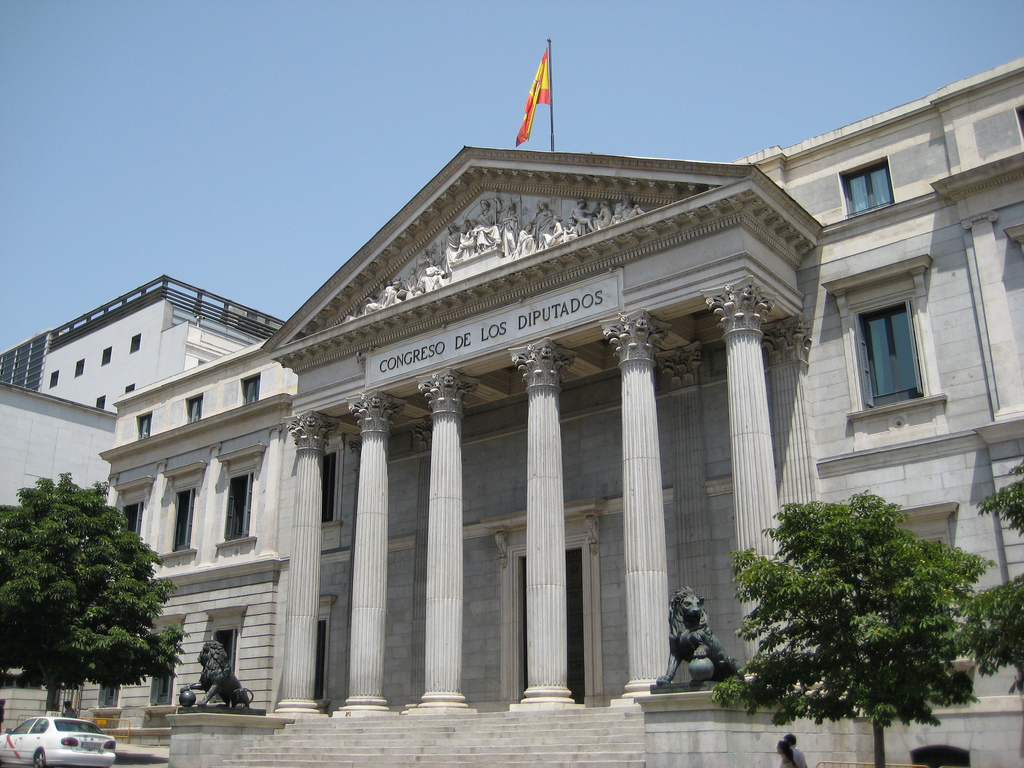
The Congress of Deputies, the lower chamber of Spanish Parliament

Country	Connection between the legislature and the executive
Albania	The President of Albania nominates the candidate chosen by the party or coalition which holds a majority in the Parliament of Albania. The Parliament then approves the Cabinet. If the nomination is rejected by the Parliament, another candidate is chosen by the President within 10 days.
Andorra	
Austria	
Belgium	Federal Parliament approves the Cabinet of Belgium
Bulgaria	National Assembly appoints the Council of Ministers of Bulgaria
Croatia	Croatian Parliament approves President of Government and the Cabinet nominated by him/her.
Czech Republic	President of the Czech Republic appoints usually the leader of the largest party or coalition in the Chamber of Deputies of the Parliament as Prime Minister, who forms the Cabinet. The Prime Minister must gain a vote of confidence by the Chamber of Deputies.
Denmark	The Monarch appoints, based on recommendations from the leaders of the parties in Folketinget, the cabinet leader who is most likely to successfully assemble a Cabinet which will not be disapproved by a majority in Folketinget.
Estonia	Riigikogu elects the Prime Minister candidate nominated by the President of the Republic (normally this candidate is the leader of the parliamentary coalition of parties). The Government of the Republic of Estonia is later appointed by the President of the Republic under proposal of the approved Prime Minister candidate. The Riigikogu may remove the Prime Minister and any other member of the government through a motion of no confidence.
Finland	Parliament of Finland appoints the Cabinet of Finland
Germany	Bundestag elects the Federal Chancellor (after nomination from the President of Germany), who forms the Cabinet
Greece	Hellenic Parliament approves the Cabinet of Greece
Hungary	National Assembly approves the Cabinet of Hungary
Iceland	The President of Iceland appoints and discharges the Cabinet of Iceland. Ministers can not even resign without being discharged by presidential decree.
Ireland	Dáil Éireann nominates the Taoiseach, who is then appointed by the President of Ireland
Italy	Italian Parliament grants and revokes its confidence in the Cabinet of Italy, appointed by the President of Italy
Kosovo	Assembly of Kosovo appoints the Government of Kosovo
Latvia	Saeima appoints the Cabinet of Ministers of the Republic of Latvia
Luxembourg	Chamber of Deputies appoints the Cabinet of Luxembourg
Malta	House of Representatives appoints the Cabinet of Malta
Moldova	Parliament of Moldova appoints the Cabinet of Moldova
Montenegro	Parliament of Montenegro appoints the Government of Montenegro
Netherlands	Second Chamber of the States-General can dismiss the Cabinet of the Netherlands through a motion of no confidence
North Macedonia	Assembly approves the Government of North Macedonia
Norway	The Monarch appoints the MP leading the largest party or coalition in Stortinget as Prime Minister, who forms the Cabinet
Poland	The President of Poland appoints the Prime Minister and the Government, subject to a vote of confidence by the Sejm within two weeks. If this fails, the Sejm can approve its own candidate with an absolute majority of votes within two weeks.
Portugal	After the elections for the Assembly of the Republic or the resignation of the previous government, the president listens to the parties in the Assembly of the Republic and invites someone to form a government, usually the leader of the biggest party. Then the president swears in the prime minister and the Government.
San Marino	
Serbia	National Assembly appoints the Government of Serbia
Slovakia	National Council approves the Government of Slovakia
Slovenia	National Assembly appoints the Government of Slovenia
Spain	The Congress of Deputies elects the President of the Government, who forms the Cabinet
Sweden	The Riksdag elects the Prime Minister, who in turn appoints the other members of the Government
United Kingdom	The Leader, almost invariably a Member of Parliament (MP) and of the political party which commands or is likely to command the confidence of a majority of the House of Commons, is appointed Prime Minister by the British sovereign, who then appoints members of the Cabinet on the nomination and advice of the Prime Minister.

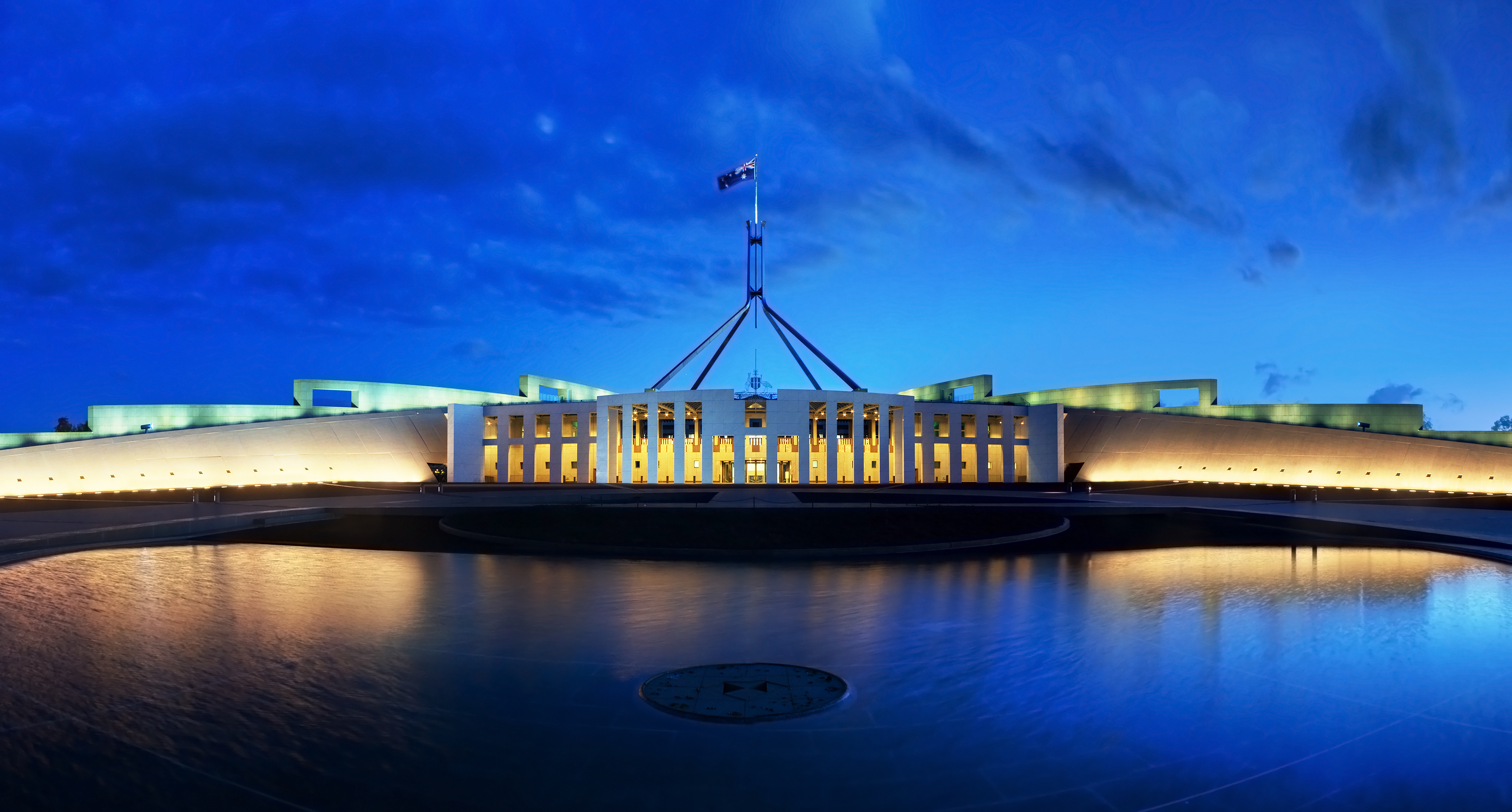
Parliament of Australia

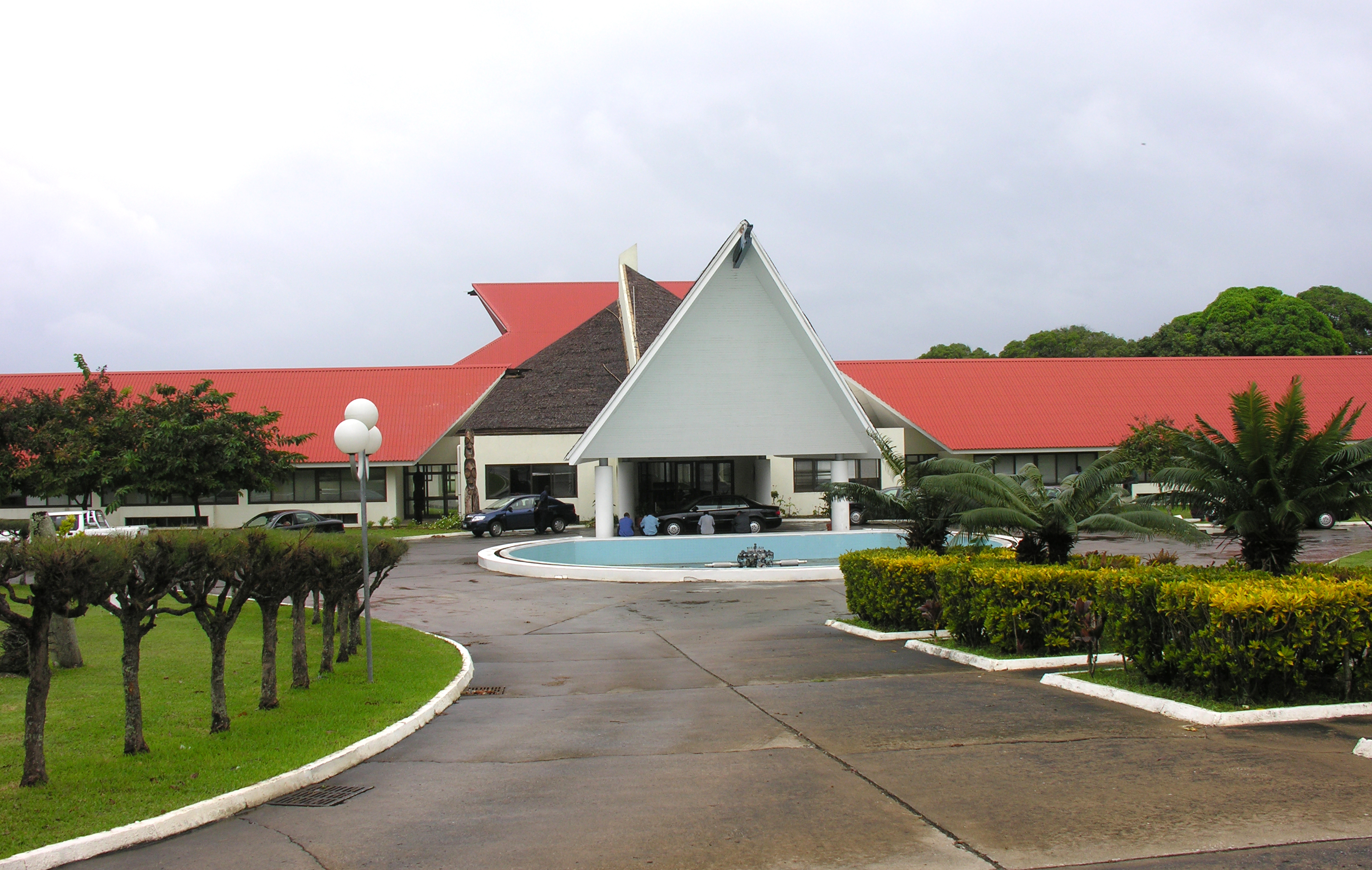
Parliament of Vanuatu

=== Oceania ===
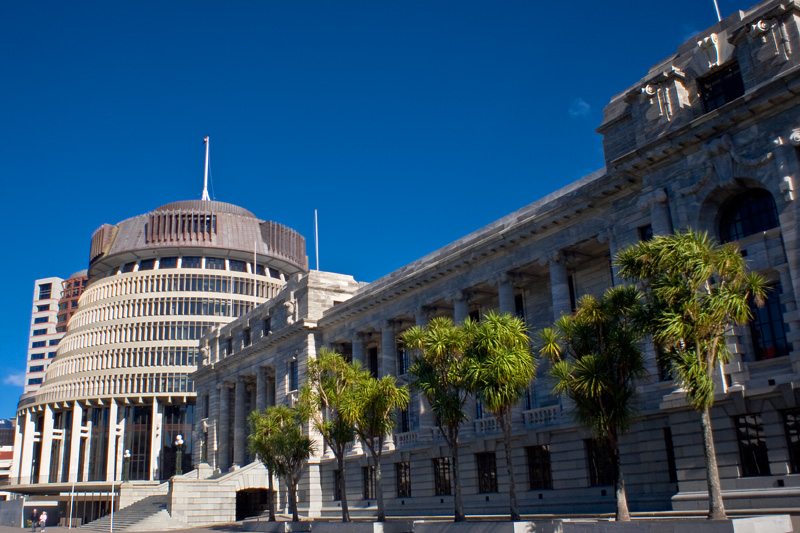
Parliament of New Zealand

Country	Connection between the legislature and the executive
Australia	Leader of the political party that has the support of a majority in the Australian House of Representatives is appointed Prime Minister of Australia by the Governor-General of Australia, who then appoints the Cabinet of Australia on the advice of the Prime Minister
New Zealand	Leader of the political party that has the support of a majority in the New Zealand House of Representatives is appointed Prime Minister of New Zealand by the Governor-General of New Zealand, who then appoints the Cabinet of New Zealand on the advice of the Prime Minister
Papua New Guinea	Leader of the political party that has the support of a majority in the National Parliament is appointed Prime Minister of Papua New Guinea by the Governor-General of Papua New Guinea, who then appoints the Cabinet of Papua New Guinea on the advice of the Prime Minister
Samoa	Legislative Assembly appoints the Cabinet of Samoa
Vanuatu	Parliament of Vanuatu appoints the Cabinet of Vanuatu

== See also ==
- Law reform
- List of legislatures by country
- List of political systems in France
- Parliamentary leader
- Parliamentary monarchy
- Parliament in the Making
- Responsible government
- Rule according to higher law
- Rule of law
- Strengthened parliamentary system
