= List of countries by system of government =

World's states colored by systems of government: Parliamentary systems: Head of government is elected or nominated by and accountable to the legislature. Constitutional monarchy with a ceremonial monarch Semi-constitutional monarchy: Monarch holds significant executive or legislative power but is still restricted by the constitution. Parliamentary republic with a ceremonial president Parliamentary republic with an executive president Presidential system: Head of government (president) is popularly elected and independent of the legislature. Presidential republic Theocratic presidential republic: Supreme leader is highest authority; popularly elected president still exists. Hybrid systems: Semi-presidential republic: Executive president is independent of the legislature; head of government is appointed by the president and is accountable to the legislature. Assembly-independent republic: Head of government (president or directory) is elected by the legislature, but is not accountable to it. Other systems: Islamic theocracy: Supreme leader holds unlimited political and religious power; state and faith are a single institution. Absolute monarchy: Monarch has unlimited power. One-party state: Power is constitutionally linked to a single political party. Provisional government: Current regime is temporary or transitional; no permanent constitution. Military junta: Committee of military leaders controls the government; constitutional provisions are suspended. Places without governments. Note: this chart represents the de jure systems of government, not the de facto degree of democracy.

This is a list of sovereign states by their de jure systems of government, as specified by the incumbent regime's constitutional law. This list does not measure the degree of de facto democracy or political corruption and state capacity of their governments.

== Parliamentary systems ==
=== Constitutional monarchies ===
These are systems in which the head of state is a constitutional monarch; the existence of their office and their ability to exercise their authority is established and restrained by constitutional law.

Systems in which a prime minister is the active head of the executive branch of government. In some cases, the prime minister is also the leader of the legislature, while in other cases the executive branch is clearly separated from legislature (although the entire cabinet or individual ministers must step down in the case of a vote of no confidence). The head of state is a monarch who normally only exercises their powers with the consent of the government, the people and/or their representatives (except in emergencies, e.g. a constitutional crisis or a political deadlock). (Note: Some monarchs are given a limited number of discretionary reserve powers only to be used in certain circumstances in accordance with their responsibility to defend the constitution.)

==== Parliamentary constitutional monarchies ====
- Andorra (Note: The Bishop of Urgell and President of France serve as ex officio co-princes who have their interests known through a representative.)
- Antigua and Barbuda (Note: One of 15 constitutional monarchies which recognize the Monarch of the United Kingdom as the hereditary symbolic head of state in a personal union, who presides over an independent government. The Monarch is titled separately in each country (e.g. King of Australia), and notionally appoints a Governor-general (GG) to each country other than the United Kingdom to act as his representative. The prime minister (PM) is the active head of the executive branch of government and also leader of the legislature. These countries may be known as "Commonwealth realms". In many cases, the Governor-general or monarch has a lot more theoretical, or constitutional, powers than they actually exercise, except on the advice of elected officials, per constitutional convention. For example, the Constitution of Australia makes the GG the head of the executive branch (including commander-in-chief of the armed forces), although they seldom ever use this power, except on the advice of elected officials, especially the PM, which makes the PM the de facto head of government.)
- Australia (Note: Semi-parliamentary system)
- Bahamas
- Belgium
- Belize
- Cambodia
- Canada
- Cook Islands (Note: The Cook Islands and Niue are under the sovereignty of the Monarch of New Zealand as self-governing states in free association with New Zealand. New Zealand and its associated states, along with Tokelau and the Ross Dependency, comprise the Realm of New Zealand, united by a shared moanarch.)
- Denmark (Note: The Danish Realm consists of Denmark, Faroe Islands and Greenland and all are under the sovereignty of the Monarch of the Danish Realm.)
- Grenada
- Jamaica
- Japan
- Lesotho
- Luxembourg
- Malaysia
- Netherlands
- New Zealand
- Niue
- Norway
- Papua New Guinea
- Saint Kitts and Nevis
- Saint Lucia
- Saint Vincent and the Grenadines
- Solomon Islands
- Spain
- Sweden
- Thailand
- Tuvalu
- United Kingdom

Non-UN members are in italics.

==== Semi-constitutional monarchies ====
The prime minister is the nation's active executive, but the monarch still has considerable political powers that can be used at their own discretion.

- Bahrain
- Bhutan
- Kuwait
- Jordan
- Liechtenstein
- Monaco
- Morocco
- Qatar
- Tonga
- United Arab Emirates (Note: A federal absolute monarchy in which different monarchies or, in this case, sheikhdoms fulfill both the duty of president and prime minister, although in actuality they are monarchs.)

=== Parliamentary republics ===
In a parliamentary republic, the head of government is selected or nominated by the legislature and is also accountable to it. The head of state is usually called a president and (in full parliamentary republics) is separate from the head of government, serving a largely apolitical, ceremonial role. In these systems, the head of government is usually called the prime minister, chancellor or premier. In mixed republican systems and directorial republican systems, the head of government also serves as head of state and is usually titled president.

==== Parliamentary republics with directly elected ceremonial heads of state ====
- Bosnia and Herzegovina (Note: Collective presidency consisting of three members; one for each major ethnic group.) (Note: Despite having a collective head of state, the head of state is ceremonial, and as such the nation is not executively governed by a directorial system.)
- Bulgaria
- Croatia
- Czech Republic
- Finland
- Iceland
- Ireland
- Moldova
- Montenegro
- North Macedonia
- Poland
- Serbia
- Singapore
- Slovakia
- Slovenia

==== Parliamentary republics with indirectly elected ceremonial heads of state ====
- Albania
- Armenia
- Bangladesh
- Barbados
- Dominica
- Estonia
- Ethiopia
- Fiji
- Georgia
- Germany
- Greece
- Hungary
- India
- Iraq
- Israel
- Italy
- Kosovo
- Latvia
- Lebanon
- Malta
- Mauritius
- Nepal
- Pakistan
- Samoa
- San Marino (Note: Their two-person head of state and government, the Captains Regent, serve for six month terms.Secretary of State for Foreign and Political Affairs serves as de facto head of government and is the most powerful position in the country.)
- Trinidad and Tobago
- Togo
- Vanuatu

Non-UN members are in italics.

=== Parliamentary republics with an executive presidency ===
A combined head of state and head of government in the form of an executive president. In effect, "presidents" in this system function the same as prime ministers do in other parliamentary systems.

==== Parliamentary republics with indirectly elected executive presidency ====
Presidency is elected by the legislature and they must maintain the confidence of the legislature to remain in office.

- Botswana (Note: The president is elected by the parliament and holds a parliamentary seat (as an ex officio member), much like a prime minister. If a vote of no confidence is successful and they do not resign, it triggers the dissolution of the legislature and new elections (per section 92 of the Constitution).)
- Marshall Islands
- Nauru
- South Africa

==== Parliamentary republics with directly elected executive presidency ====
Presidency is directly elected by the voters (from among candidates nominated by the legislature in the case of Kiribati), and they must maintain the confidence of the legislature to remain in office. Often this form is not considered parliamentary, but a hybrid system. This system is more common on subnational levels, such as regions and municipalities, for example Italy uses such a system on both these levels.

- Guyana (Note: President and legislature are elected directly by the people via double simultaneous vote.) (Note: The president is constitutionally obligated to dissolve parliament after a successful no-confidence motion against the government (article 106(6)) and new elections are called within 3 months (article 61).)
- Kiribati (Note: Per the Constitution, Kiribati's president is elected by plurality voting after candidates for the presidency are nominated by the newly elected legislature. If a vote of no confidence against the president is successful, they are removed from office and the legislature stands dissolved (triggering a new election for it) in the interim a body known as the "Council of State" (comprising the chief justice, the president of the public service commission and speaker of the legislature) serves the functions of the presidency.)

== Presidential systems ==
In presidential system, a president is both the head of state and head of government, and is elected and remains in office independently of the legislature. There is generally no prime minister, although if one exists, in most cases they serve purely at the discretion of the president.

=== Presidential republics without a prime minister ===
- Angola
- Benin
- Bolivia
- Brazil
- Chile
- Colombia
- Comoros
- Costa Rica
- Cyprus
- Dominican Republic
- Ecuador
- El Salvador
- Gabon
- Gambia
- Ghana
- Guatemala
- Honduras
- Indonesia
- Liberia
- Malawi
- Maldives
- Mexico
- Nicaragua
- Nigeria
- Palau
- Panama
- Paraguay
- Philippines
- Seychelles
- Somaliland
- Turkey
- Turkmenistan
- United States
- Uruguay
- Venezuela
- Zambia

Non-UN members are in italics.

=== Presidential republics with a prime minister ===
The following countries have presidential systems where the post of prime minister (official title may vary) exists alongside that of the president. The president is often still both the head of state and government and the prime minister's role is to mostly assist the president.

- Abkhazia
- Argentina (see Chief of the Cabinet of Ministers)
- Burundi (Note: The prime minister is the official head of government, but they are appointed directly by the president and hold little power, so the nation is still usually classified as a presidential republic)
- Cameroon
- Central African Republic
- Djibouti
- Equatorial Guinea
- Guinea
- Ivory Coast
- Kenya (see Prime Cabinet Secretary)
- Kyrgyzstan (see Chairman of the Cabinet of Ministers)
- Senegal
- Sierra Leone (see Chief minister)
- South Korea
- Tajikistan
- Tanzania
- Tunisia
- Uganda

Non-UN members are in italics.

=== Theocratic presidential republic ===
Iran combines the forms of a presidential republic, with a president elected by universal suffrage, and a theocracy, with a Supreme Leader who is ultimately responsible for state policy, chosen for life by the elected Assembly of Experts. Candidates for both the Assembly of Experts and the presidency are vetted by the appointed Guardian Council.

== Hybrid systems ==
=== Semi-presidential republics ===
In a semi-presidential republic a president exists alongside a prime minister and a cabinet, with the latter two being responsible to the legislature. It differs from a parliamentary system in that it has an executive president independent from the legislature; and from the presidential system in that the cabinet, although named by the president, is responsible to the legislature, which may force the cabinet to resign through a motion of no confidence.

==== President-parliamentary systems ====
In a president-parliamentary system, the prime minister and cabinet are dually accountable to the president and the legislature.

- Austria (Note: Austria is de jure semi-presidential according to the country's Constitution, but is de facto more like a parliamentary republic. According to the constitutional convention, the Chancellor is the country's leading political figure, despite nominally being ranked third according to the Constitution.)
- Azerbaijan
- Belarus
- Chad
- Congo, Republic of the
- Kazakhstan
- Mauritania
- Mozambique (Note: The Prime Minister is not the head of government; instead, the President serves as both head of state and government. However, as the Prime Minister and the cabinet are responsible to the legislature as well with the President, the nation is still usually classified as a semi-presidential republic.)
- Namibia
- Peru
- Russia
- Rwanda
- South Ossetia
- Sri Lanka
- Taiwan (Note: Nominally a parliamentary republic; the semi-presidential system is based on temporary additional articles. According to the Constitution of the Republic of China, the National Assembly indirectly elects the President of the Republic, which is the ceremonial figurehead of the state. Executive power rested with the Premier of the Republic of China, who is nominated and appointed by the president, with the consent of the Legislative Yuan. The additional articles made the President directly elected by the citizens of the free area and replaced Legislative Yuan confirmation for Premieral appointments with a conventional vote of no confidence, superseding the ordinary constitutional provisions. A Sunset provision in the additional articles will terminate them in the event of a hypothetical resumption of ROC rule in Mainland China.)
- Transnistria
- Uzbekistan

Non-UN members are in italics.

==== Premier-presidential systems ====
In a premier-presidential system, the prime minister and cabinet are exclusively accountable to the legislature.

- Algeria
- Cape Verde
- Congo, Democratic Republic of the
- Egypt
- France
- Haiti
- Lithuania
- Mongolia
- Northern Cyprus
- Portugal
- Romania
- São Tomé and Príncipe
- Timor-Leste
- Ukraine

Non-UN members are in italics.

=== Assembly-independent republic ===
In an assembly-independent republic, the executive is elected by the legislature but, once in office, is not politically accountable to a majority in the legislature. That is, the executive cannot be removed by a simple-majority vote of the legislature, such as a vote of no confidence. This places such systems outside the logic of parliamentary republics, in which the executive depends on continued legislative confidence, and presidential systems, in which the executive is elected independently of the legislature. In comparative politics, this institutional arrangement is commonly described as assembly-independent government, referring to systems that combine legislative election of the executive with its independence from parliamentary dismissal. They may or may not also hold a seat in the legislature.

- Federated States of Micronesia (Note: Holds a legislative seat.)
- Myanmar (Note: Disputed between the internationally recognized Tatmadaw-led Government and the National Unity Government.)
- Suriname
- Zimbabwe

==== Directorial republic ====
Switzerland employs a Federal Council which jointly exercises the powers of the head of state and government collectively. The Federal Council is elected by the Assembly but is not subject to parliamentary confidence during its fixed term. The President is the Presiding member of the Federal Council in a primus inter pares (first among equals) capacity and has no powers over other members of the directory.

== Other systems ==
=== Islamic theocracy ===
Afghanistan (Note: The ruling Islamic Emirate of Afghanistan is mostly unrecognized, and the defunct Islamic Republic of Afghanistan is still considered legitimate by most countries, although the United Nations decided in 2022 that the Islamic Republic had stopped being the officially recognized government on 15 August 2021, because it had ceased to exist after that point. No Islamic Republic officials remain recognized by the UN, and caretaker UN representatitve Naseer Faiq has renounced his affiliation with the Islamic Republic. See Afghanistan and the United Nations for a detailed treatment.) has a theocratic system wherein the supreme leader holds unlimited political power and the Quran is used in place of a constitution.

=== Absolute monarchies ===
Specifically, monarchies in which the monarch's exercise of power is unconstrained by any substantive constitutional law.

- Brunei
- Eswatini
- Oman
- Saudi Arabia
- Vatican City (Note: The Vatican is an elective absolute monarchy and a Roman Catholic theocracy; its monarch, the Pope, is the head of the global Catholic Church. His power within the Vatican City State is unlimited by any constitution; however, as all its citizens and its residents are ordained Catholic clergy, members of the Swiss Guard, or their immediate family, they arguably have consented to obey the Pope or are minors. (Citizenship is jus officii, on the grounds of appointment to work in a certain capacity in the service of the Holy See and usually ceases upon cessation of the appointment. Citizenship is also extended to the spouse and children of a citizen, provided they are living together in the city; in practice, these are few in number, since the bulk of Vatican citizens are celibate Catholic clerics or religious. Some individuals are also authorized to reside in the city but do not qualify or choose not to request citizenship.))

=== One-party states ===
States in which political power is by law concentrated within one political party whose operations are largely fused with the government hierarchy (in contrast to states where a multi-party system formally exists, but this fusion is achieved anyway through election fraud or underdeveloped multi-party traditions). Sometimes other parties are permitted to exist and hold seats but are part of a coalition with the dominant political party and are expected not to significantly oppose it.

- China (Communist Party leads 8 minor parties) (list)
- Cuba (Communist Party) (list)
- Eritrea (People's Front for Democracy and Justice) (list)
- North Korea (Workers' Party leads 2 minor parties) (list)
- Laos (People's Revolutionary Party leads the Front for National Development) (list)
- Sahrawi Arab Democratic Republic (Polisario Front)
- Vietnam (Communist Party leads the Fatherland Front) (list)

Non-UN members are in italics.

=== Provisional governments ===
States that have a system of government that is in transition or turmoil. These regimes often lack a permanent constitution; forms of government under the current regime are stated in parentheses.

- Libya (parliamentary republic) (Note: Disputed between the internationally recognized Government of National Unity and the Government of National Stability.)
- Palestine (semi-presidential republic) (Note: Disputed between the Fatah-led Palestinian Authority in the West Bank and the Hamas-led government in Gaza.)
- Somalia (parliamentary republic)
- South Sudan (presidential republic)
- Syria (presidential republic)
- Yemen (semi-presidential republic) (Note: Disputed between the internationally recognized Presidential Leadership Council and the Houthi-led Supreme Political Council.)

==== Military juntas ====
A committee of the nation's military leaders controls the government for the duration of a state of emergency. Constitutional provisions for government are suspended in these states; constitutional forms of government are stated in parentheses.

- Burkina Faso (semi-presidential republic)
- Madagascar (semi-presidential republic)
- Guinea-Bissau (semi-presidential republic)
- Mali (presidential republic)
- Niger (semi-presidential republic)
- Sudan (semi-presidential republic) (Note: Disputed between the internationally recognized Transitional Sovereignty Council and the Government of Peace and Unity.)

== Systems of internal structure ==
=== Unitary states ===
A state governed as a single power in which the central government is ultimately supreme and any administrative divisions (sub-national units) exercise only the powers that the central government chooses to delegate. The majority of states in the world have a unitary system of government. Out of all the 193 UN member states, 126 are governed as centralized unitary states, and an additional 40 are regionalized unitary states.

==== Centralized unitary states ====
States in which most power is exercised by the central government. What local authorities do exist have few powers.

- Abkhazia (7 districts)
- Afghanistan (34 provinces)
- Albania (12 counties)
- Algeria (69 provinces)
- Andorra (7 parishes)
- Angola (21 provinces)
- Antigua and Barbuda (6 parishes, and 2 dependencies)
- Armenia (10 provinces, and 1 autonomous city)
- Bahamas (33 districts, and New Providence)
- Bahrain (4 governorates)
- Bangladesh (8 divisions)
- Barbados (11 parishes)
- Belarus (6 regions, and 1 autonomous city)
- Belize (6 districts)
- Benin (12 departments)
- Bhutan (20 districts)
- Botswana (10 rural districts, and 7 urban districts)
- Brunei (4 districts)
- Bulgaria (28 provinces)
- Burkina Faso (17 regions)
- Burundi (5 provinces)
- Cambodia (24 provinces, and 1 autonomous municipality)
- Cameroon (10 regions)
- Cape Verde (22 municipalities)
- Central African Republic (20 prefectures, and 1 autonomous commune)
- Chad (23 provinces)
- Colombia (34 departments, and 1 capital district)
- Congo, Democratic Republic of the (25 provinces and 1 capital city)
- Congo, Republic of the (15 departments)
- Cook Islands (10 island councils)
- Costa Rica (7 provinces)
- Croatia (20 counties)
- Cuba (15 provinces, and 1 special municipality)
- Cyprus (2 districts (+1 uncontrolled and +3 partially uncontrolled))
- Czech Republic (13 regions, and 1 capital city)
- Djibouti (6 regions)
- Dominican Republic (10 parishes)
- Dominica (31 provinces, and 1 National District)
- Ecuador (24 provinces)
- Egypt (27 governorates)
- El Salvador (14 departments)
- Equatorial Guinea (8 provinces)
- Eritrea (6 regions)
- Estonia (15 counties)
- Eswatini (4 regions)
- Fiji (4 divisions, and 1 dependency)
- Gabon (9 provinces)
- Gambia (5 regions, and 1 city)
- Ghana (16 regions)
- Grenada (6 parishes, and 1 dependency)
- Guatemala (22 departments)
- Guinea (8 regions)
- Guinea-Bissau (8 regions, and 1 autonomous sector)
- Guyana (10 regions)
- Haiti (10 departments)
- Honduras (18 departments)
- Hungary (19 counties)
- Iceland (8 regions)
- Iran (31 provinces)
- Ireland (26 counties, 3 cities, and 2 combined cities and counties)
- Jamaica (14 parishes)
- Japan (47 prefectures)
- Jordan (12 governorates)
- Kazakhstan (17 regions, 3 cities with region rights, and Baikonur)
- Kiribati (no administrative divisions)
- Kosovo (7 districts)
- Kuwait (6 governorates)
- Kyrgyzstan (7 regions, and 2 independent cities)
- Laos (17 provinces, and 1 prefecture)
- Latvia (35 municipalities and 7 republic cities)
- Lebanon (9 governorates)
- Lesotho (10 districts)
- Liberia (15 counties)
- Libya (22 districts)
- Liechtenstein (11 municipalities)
- Lithuania (10 counties)
- Luxembourg (12 cantons)
- Madagascar (24 regions)
- Malawi (3 regions)
- Maldives (17 atolls, and 4 cities)
- Mali (19 regions, and 1 capital district)
- Malta (5 districts)
- Marshall Islands (24 municipalities)
- Mauritius (4 outer islands (+2 claimed))
- Monaco (1 municipality)
- Mongolia (21 provinces, and 1 capital city)
- Montenegro (25 municipalities)
- Morocco (9 regions (+3 partially uncontrolled))
- Mozambique (11 provinces)
- Namibia (14 regions)
- Nauru (14 districts)
- Niger (7 regions, and 1 capital district)
- Niue (14 villages)
- North Korea (9 provinces, and 4 special cities)
- North Macedonia (80 municipalities)
- Northern Cyprus (6 districts)
- Oman (11 governorates)
- Palau (16 states)
- Palestine (16 governorates)
- Panama (10 provinces, and 4 indigenous regions)
- Paraguay (17 departments, and 1 capital district)
- Poland (16 voivodeships)
- Qatar (8 municipalities)
- Romania (41 counties, and 1 autonomous municipality)
- Rwanda (4 provinces, and 1 city)
- Sahrawi Arab Democratic Republic (4 claimed provinces)
- Saint Lucia (10 districts)
- Saint Vincent and the Grenadines (6 parishes)
- Samoa (11 districts)
- San Marino (9 castelli)
- Saudi Arabia (13 provinces)
- Senegal (14 regions)
- Seychelles (26 districts)
- Sierra Leone (4 provinces, and 1 area)
- Singapore (5 community development councils)
- Slovakia (8 regions)
- Slovenia (212 municipalities)
- Somaliland (6 regions)
- South Korea (9 provinces (+5 claimed), 8 provincial-level cities, and 1 special self-governing province)
- South Ossetia (4 districts)
- Suriname (10 districts)
- Sweden (21 counties)
- Syria (13 governorates (+1 mostly uncontrolled))
- Thailand (76 provinces, and 1 special administrative area)
- Timor-Leste (13 municipalities, and 1 special administrative region)
- Togo (5 regions)
- Tonga (5 administrative divisions)
- Transnistria (5 district, and 1 municipality)
- Tunisia (24 governorates)
- Turkey (81 provinces, and 30 metropolitan municipalities)
- Turkmenistan (5 regions, and 1 capital city)
- Tuvalu (9 districts)
- Uganda (4 regions)
- Uruguay (19 departments)
- Vanuatu (6 provinces)
- Vatican City (no administrative divisions)
- Vietnam (27 provinces, and 7 municipalities)
- Yemen (21 governorates, and 1 municipality)
- Zambia (10 provinces)
- Zimbabwe (10 provinces)

Non-UN members are in italics.

==== Regionalized unitary states ====
States in which the central government has delegated some of its powers to regional authorities, but where constitutional authority ultimately remains entirely at a national level.

- Azerbaijan (59 districts, and 1 autonomous republic)
- Bolivia (9 departments)
- Chile (16 regions)
- China (22 provinces (+1 uncontrolled), 5 autonomous regions, 4 direct-administered municipalities, and 2 special administrative regions)
- Comoros (3 autonomous islands (+1 claimed))
- Denmark (3 constituent countries)
- Finland (19 regions, of which 1 is autonomous)
- France (18 regions, of which 5 are overseas, 6 overseas collectivites, and 1 overseas country)
- Georgia (5 regions (+4 partially uncontrolled), and 1 autonomous republic (+1 uncontrolled))
- Greece (7 decentralized administrations, and 1 autonomous region)
- Indonesia (38 provinces, of which 9 have special status)
- Israel (6 districts, and the Judea and Samaria Area)
- Italy (20 regions, of which 5 have autonomy status)
- Ivory Coast (14 autonomous districts)
- Kenya (47 counties)
- Mauritania (15 regions)
- Moldova (32 districts, 3 municipalities, and 1 autonomous territorial unit (+1 uncontrolled))
- Myanmar (7 states, 7 regions, 1 Union Territory, 5 Self-Administered areas, and 1 Self-Administered Division)
- Netherlands (4 constituent countries)
- New Zealand (16 regions, 1 dependent territory (+1 claimed), and 2 states in free association)
- Nicaragua (15 departments, and 2 autonomous regions)
- Norway (10 counties, 1 autonomous city, 2 integral overseas areas, and 1 dependency (+2 claimed))
- Papua New Guinea (20 provinces, 1 autonomous region, and 1 national capital district)
- Peru (25 departments, and 1 province)
- Philippines (17 administrative regions, and 1 autonomous region)
- Portugal (18 districts, and 2 autonomous regions)
- São Tomé and Príncipe (6 districts, and 1 autonomous region)
- Serbia (29 districts, 1 autonomous provinces (+1 claimed), and 1 autonomous city)
- Solomon Islands (9 provinces, and 1 capital territory)
- South Africa (9 provinces)
- Spain (17 autonomous communities, 2 autonomous cities, and 3 places of sovereignty)
- Sri Lanka (9 provinces)
- Taiwan (6 special municipalities (+12 claimed), 2 provinces (+33 claimed), and 1 claimed special administrative region)
- Tajikistan (3 regions, 1 autonomous region, and 1 capital city)
- Tanzania (31 regions)
- Trinidad and Tobago (7 regions, 5 boroughs, 2 cities, and 1 ward)
- Ukraine (20 oblasts (+4 mostly uncontrolled), 2 cities with special status, and 1 uncontrolled autonomous republic)
- United Kingdom (4 countries, of which 3 have devolved governments, 13 Overseas Territories (+1 claimed), and 3 Crown Dependencies (Note: Overseas Territories and Crown Dependencies are not part of the United Kingdom but do fall under its sovereignty.))
- Uzbekistan (12 regions, 1 independent city, and 1 autonomous republic)

Non-UN members are in italics.

=== Federation ===
States in which the national government shares power with regional governments with which it has legal or constitutional parity. The central government may or may not be (in theory) a creation of the regional governments.

- Argentina (23 provinces, and 1 autonomous city)
- Australia (6 states, 3 internal territories, and 6 external territories (+1 claimed))
- Austria (9 states)
- Belgium (3 regions, and 3 communities)
- Bosnia and Herzegovina (2 entities, and 1 district that is a condominium of the 2 entities)
- Brazil (26 states, and 1 federal district)
- Canada (10 provinces, and 3 territories)
- Ethiopia (10 regions, and 2 chartered cities)
- Germany (16 states)
- India (28 states, and 8 union territories)
- Iraq (19 governorates, and 1 federal region)
- Malaysia (13 states, and 3 federal territories)
- Mexico (31 states, and Mexico City)
- Federated States of Micronesia (4 states)
- Nepal (7 provinces)
- Nigeria (36 states, and 1 federal capital territory)
- Pakistan (4 provinces, 2 autonomous territories, and 1 federal territory)
- Russia (46 oblasts (+2 unrecognized), 21 republics (+3 unrecognized), 9 krais, 4 autonomous okrugs, 2 federal cities (+1 unrecognized), and 1 autonomous oblast)
- Saint Kitts and Nevis (2 islands)
- Somalia (6 federal member states (+1 uncontrolled))
- South Sudan (10 states, 2 administrative areas, and 1 area with special administrative status)
- Sudan (17 states, and 1 area with special administrative status)
- Switzerland (26 cantons)
- United Arab Emirates (7 emirates)
- United States (50 states, 14 territories (+2 claimed), 1 federal district, and 3 states in free association)
- Venezuela (22 states (+1 claimed), 1 capital district, and 1 federal dependency)

== European Union ==
The exact political character of the European Union is debated, some arguing that it is sui generis (unique), but others arguing that it has features of a federation or a confederation. It has elements of intergovernmentalism, with the European Council acting as its collective "president", and also elements of supranationalism, with the European Commission acting as its executive and bureaucracy.

== See also ==
- List of countries by date of transition to a republican system of government
- List of political systems in France
- List of current heads of state and government
