= Aut simul stabunt aut simul cadent =

Latin phrase

The Latin brocard aut simul stabunt aut simul cadent or simul simul for short, meaning "they will either stand together or fall together", is used in law to express those cases in which the end of a certain situation automatically brings upon the end of another one, and vice versa. The first use of this expression in the mass media, which made it known to the non-specialists, was in occasion of one of the first crises between Fascist Italy and the Vatican concerning the Concordat. Pope Pius XI is believed to have pronounced the sentence to express the fact that challenging the Concordat would have swept away the whole Lateran Treaty, reopening the Roman question.

== Constitutional law ==
In contemporary constitutional law, especially in the regions and municipalities of Italy, this expression is often used to refer to a mechanism where the resignation or the death of the head of government causes the dissolution of the legislature. This includes the case of the approval of a motion of no confidence, whereby the legislature can only dismiss the head of government at the price of its own dissolution.

== Variants and abbreviations ==
- Simul stabunt aut simul cadent
- Simul stabunt vel simul cadent
- Simul stabunt, simul cadent
- Simul simul

== See also ==
- Muerte cruzada
