= Parliamentary republics with an executive presidency =

Parliamentary democracy with an executive president

World's states colored by systems of government: Parliamentary systems: Head of government is elected or nominated by and accountable to the legislature. Constitutional monarchy with a ceremonial monarch Semi-constitutional monarchy: Monarch holds significant executive or legislative power but is still restricted by the constitution. Parliamentary republic with a ceremonial president Parliamentary republic with an executive president Presidential system: Head of government (president) is popularly elected and independent of the legislature. Presidential republic Theocratic presidential republic: Supreme leader is highest authority; popularly elected president still exists. Hybrid systems: Semi-presidential republic: Executive president is independent of the legislature; head of government is appointed by the president and is accountable to the legislature. Assembly-independent republic: Head of government (president or directory) is elected by the legislature, but is not accountable to it. Other systems: Islamic theocracy: Supreme leader holds unlimited political and religious power; state and faith are a single institution. Absolute monarchy: Monarch has unlimited power. One-party state: Power is constitutionally linked to a single political party. Provisional government: Current regime is temporary or transitional; no permanent constitution. Military junta: Committee of military leaders controls the government; constitutional provisions are suspended. Places without governments. Note: this chart represents the de jure systems of government, not the de facto degree of democracy.

A parliamentary republic with an executive presidency is a form of parliamentary republic in which the executive derives its democratic legitimacy from its ability to command the confidence of the legislature to which it is held accountable, but is characterized by a combined head of state–head of government office in the form of an executive president who carries out both functions. This is in contrast to conventional parliamentary systems (whether a monarchy or a republic) in which the executive is separate from the head of state, and a presidential system where the executive does not derive its legitimacy from the legislature. The president is typically elected by the legislature and must maintain its confidence to remain in office, for which purpose they may be required to hold a seat. This in contrast to more typical parliamentary systems, which do not feature an executive presidency and the president does not answer to parliament and is most commonly elected by popular vote, similarly to executive presidents in presidential systems.

This method of presidential election is distinct from an assembly-independent republic, in which either the head of government (as in the Federated States of Micronesia) or the directorial executive (as in Switzerland) are elected by the legislature but are not accountable to it. It is also distinct from the semi-presidential system in which the president is separate from the government subject to parliamentary confidence but shares executive power.

== Countries ==
Jurisdiction	System	Title	Election	Removal	Term limits	Position in cabinet	Power to shape cabinet	Promulgation of laws	Granting pardons	Emergency / War	Other provisions
Botswana	Parliamentary	President	The president is elected by parliament (if election results in a hung parliament) and holds a parliamentary seat (ex-officio)	If a vote of no confidence is successful and they do not resign, it triggers the dissolution of the legislature and new elections are called (section 92 of the Constitution).	2 Terms (10 years in total)	Yes	Yes	Yes	Yes	Yes	
Guyana	Directly elected prime-ministerial	President	The president and the legislature are elected directly by the people via double simultaneous vote	The president is constitutionally obligated to dissolve parliament after a successful no-confidence motion against the government ((article 106(6)) and new elections are called within 3 months (article 61)).	2 Terms (10 years in total)	Yes	Yes	Yes	Yes	Yes	
Kiribati	Directly elected prime-ministerial	President	The president is elected by plurality voting after candidates for the presidency are nominated by the newly elected legislature	If a vote of no confidence against the president is successful, they are removed from office and the legislature stands dissolved (triggering a new election for it) in the interim a body known as the "Council of State" (comprising the chief justice, the president of the public service commission and speaker of the legislature) fulfills the functions of the presidency.	3 Terms (12 years in total)	No	Yes	Yes		Yes	
Marshall Islands	Parliamentary	President	?	?	?	?	?	?	?	?	
Nauru	Parliamentary	President	The president is elected by parliament	?	?	?	?	?	?	?	
South Africa	Parliamentary	President	The president is elected by the National Assembly, the lower house of Parliament, from among its members.	The president may be removed either by a motion of no-confidence or an impeachment trial.	2 terms (10 years in total)	?	Yes	Yes	Yes	Yes (see section 37 of constitution)	The president is required to be a member of the National Assembly at the time of the election. Upon election, the president immediately resigns their seat for the duration of the presidential term.
Zimbabwe	Parliamentary	President	The president is elected by a joint sitting of the Senate and the National Assembly after every general election.	The president may be removed by joint resolution of the National Assembly and the Senate.	2 terms (14 years in total)	Yes	Yes	Yes	Yes	Yes	

=== Former ===
Jurisdiction	Title	Election	Removal	Term limits	Position in cabinet	Power to shape cabinet	Promulgation of laws	Granting pardons	Emergency / War	Other provisions	Remarks
Indonesia	President	The president was elected by the People's Consultative Assembly by plurality. (Article 6(2))	The process of removal was not defined. The president would be replaced by the vice president if there was any vacancy (e.g. died, resigned, or incapable to do their duties). (Article 8)	No term limit was defined. (Article 7)	Yes	Yes	Yes	Yes	Yes		The 2001 amendments to the Constitution of Indonesia, which had occurred just few months after the ousting of then president Abdurrahman Wahid, replaced this de facto parliamentary system with a purely presidential one. This should not be confused with the parliamentary system of Liberal Democracy period (with prime minister as the head of government), where it was created under the Provisional Constitution of 1950.
The Protectorate	Lord Protector	The Lord Protector was elected by the Council of State. Later under the Humble Petition and Advice the Lord Protector was given the power to nominate a successor.	The process of removal was not defined.	None (served for life)	?	?	Yes	Yes	No	The Lord Protector served for life and officially was non-hereditary.	Oliver Cromwell served as first Lord Protector after the Execution of Charles I, first under the Instrument of Government and later the Humble Petition and Advice. After his death his son and designated successor Richard Cromwell was appointed as Lord Protector. Richard Cromwell served only eighth mouths until he was forced to resign and the British Monarchies were restored.

== Sub-national level ==
=== Austria ===
Austria	Title	Election	Removal	Term limits	Position in cabinet	Power to shape cabinet	Promulgation of laws	Granting pardons	Emergency / War	Other provisions
Burgenland	Landeshauptmann									
Carinthia	Landeshauptmann									
Lower Austria	Landeshauptmann									
Salzburg	Landeshauptmann									
Styria	Landeshauptmann									
Tyrol	Landeshauptmann									
Upper Austria	Landeshauptmann									
Vienna	Bürgermeister									
Vorarlberg	Landeshauptmann									

=== Germany ===
Germany	Title	Election	Removal	Term limits	Position in cabinet	Power to shape cabinet	Promulgation of laws	Granting pardons	Emergency / War	Other provisions
Baden-Württemberg	Minister-president	Majority of members of parliament	Constructive vote of no confidence	No	guideline competence	limited (cabinet appointments subject to parliamentary approval, the state parliament may recall individual cabinet ministers with a two-thirds majority)		Yes		
Bavaria	Minister-president	Simple majority of members of parliament	None, but if the Minister-president does not resign although they have lost the confidence of parliament, they can be indicted before the state constitutional court	No	guideline competence	limited (cabinet appointments subject to parliamentary approval)	Yes	Yes		
Berlin	Governing Mayor	Simple majority of members of parliament	Vote of no confidence (if the state parliament does not elect a new Governing Mayor within 21 days, the former officeholder is reinvested automatically)	No	guideline competence	full		No (whole cabinet)		
Brandenburg	Minister-President	Majority of members of parliament (first and second ballot), plurality (third ballot)	Constructive vote of no confidence	No	guideline competence	full		Yes		
Bremen	President of the Senate	Simple majority of members of parliament	Constructive vote of no confidence	No	ceremonial precedence	none (the parliament elects and dismisses all cabinet members)		No (whole cabinet)		may not be a member of the state parliament
Hamburg	First Mayor	Majority of members of parliament	Constructive vote of no confidence	No	guideline competence	limited (cabinet appointments subject to parliamentary approval)		No (whole cabinet)		may not be a member of the state parliament
Hesse	Minister-president	Majority of members of parliament	Vote of no confidence	No	guideline competence	limited (dismissal of cabinet members subject to parliamentary approval)		Yes		members of noble houses, which have reigned in Germany before 1918, are ineligible for office
Lower Saxony	Minister-president	Majority of members of parliament or plurality, if the state parliament does not elect a minister-president in 21 days and does not dissolve itself thereupon	Constructive vote of no confidence	No	guideline competence	limited (cabinet appointments subject to parliamentary approval)		Yes		
Mecklenburg-Vorpommern	Minister-president	Majority of members of parliament or plurality, if the state parliament does not elect a minister-president in 28 days and does not dissolve itself thereupon	Constructive vote of no confidence	No	guideline competence	full		Yes		
North Rhine-Westphalia	Minister-President	Majority of members of parliament (first ballot), simple majority (second and third ballot), runoff (fourth ballot)	Constructive vote of no confidence	No	guideline competence	full		Yes		has to be a member of the state parliament
Rhineland-Palatinate	Minister-president	Majority of members of parliament	Vote of no confidence	No	guideline competence	full		Yes		
Saarland	Minister-president	Majority of members of parliament	Vote of no confidence	No	guideline competence	limited (cabinet appointments and dismissals subject to parliamentary approval)		No (whole cabinet)		
Saxony	Minister-president	Majority of members of parliament (first ballot), simple majority (following ballots)	Constructive vote of no confidence	No	guideline competence	full	Together with president of parliament	Yes		
Saxony-Anhalt	Minister-president	Majority of members of parliament or simple majority, if the state parliament does not elect a minister-president in 14 days and does not dissolve itself thereupon	Constructive vote of no confidence	No	guideline competence	full		Yes		
Schleswig-Holstein	Minister-president	Majority of members of parliament (first and second ballot), plurality (third ballot)	Constructive vote of no confidence	No	guideline competence	full		Yes		
Thuringia	Minister-president	Majority of members of parliament (first and second ballot), plurality (third ballot)	Constructive vote of no confidence	No	guideline competence	full		Yes		

=== South Africa ===
South Africa	Title	Election	Removal	Term limits	Position in cabinet	Power to shape cabinet	Promulgation of laws	Granting pardons	Emergency / War	Other provisions
Eastern Cape	Premier	Majority of members of parliament	Vote of no confidence	Two terms maximum						
Free State	Premier	Majority of members of parliament	Vote of no confidence	Two terms maximum						
Gauteng	Premier	Majority of members of parliament	Vote of no confidence	Two terms maximum						
Limpopo	Premier	Majority of members of parliament	Vote of no confidence	Two terms maximum						
Mpumalanga	Premier	Majority of members of parliament	Vote of no confidence	Two terms maximum						
Northern Cape	Premier	Majority of members of parliament	Vote of no confidence	Two terms maximum						
North West	Premier	Majority of members of parliament	Vote of no confidence	Two terms maximum						
Western Cape	Premier	Majority of members of parliament	Vote of no confidence	Two terms maximum						
