= Executive president =

Head of state who exercises authority over the governance of that state

An executive president is a head of state who exercises authority over the governance of the state. The role can be found in presidential, semi-presidential, and parliamentary systems. Executive presidents are typically elected directly.

An executive president contrasts with a figurehead president, which exists in most parliamentary republics, and fills a symbolic, nonpolitical role (and is often appointed by parliament) while the prime minister holds executive power. A small number of nations, like South Africa and Botswana, have both an executive presidency and a system of governance that is parliamentary, with the president elected by and dependent on the confidence of the legislature. In these states, the offices of president and prime minister (as both head of state and head of government respectively) might be said to be combined.

To prevent the abuse of power, checks and balances are implemented through the legislative and judiciary bodies. For example, in the United States one method is impeachment whereby the president can be held accountable if others deem their actions unconstitutional, with the most recent example being the impeachment trials of President Donald Trump.

== Elections ==
In parliamentary republics, where there is an executive president, they are most commonly chosen by the legislature. This is in contrast to parliamentary republics without an executive presidency, where the president is usually elected directly, most commonly via a two-round system.

In full presidential systems and semi-presidential systems, the president is elected independently of the legislature. There are several methods in which to do this, including the plurality system and the two-round system. Whilst these methods use the popular vote, not all presidents are chosen in this way. For example, to be elected in the United States, a candidate must win a majority of the votes from the Electoral College, not the popular vote.

== Contemporary examples ==
=== Presidential systems ===
- Angola
- Bolivia
- Brazil
- Burundi
- Chad
- Chile
- Colombia
- Comoros
- Costa Rica
- Cyprus
- Dominican Republic
- Ecuador
- El Salvador
- Gambia, The
- Ghana
- Guatemala
- Honduras
- Indonesia
- Iran
- Kenya
- Liberia
- Malawi
- Maldives
- Mexico
- Nicaragua
- Nigeria
- Palau
- Panama
- Paraguay
- Philippines
- Senegal
- Seychelles
- Sierra Leone
- Somaliland
- South Sudan
- Turkey
- Turkmenistan
- United States
- Uruguay
- Venezuela
- Zambia
- Zimbabwe
- Abkhazia
- Argentina
- Belarus
- Benin
- Cameroon
- Central African Republic
- Djibouti
- Gabon
- Guinea
- Equatorial Guinea
- Guyana
- Ivory Coast
- South Korea
- Peru
- Rwanda
- Sudan
- Tajikistan
- Tanzania
- Togo
- Uganda
- Uzbekistan
- Yemen

=== Semi-presidential systems ===
- Algeria
- Burkina Faso
- Cape Verde
- Congo, Democratic Republic of the
- East Timor
- Egypt
- France (Note: In France, the President chooses (if he hasn't a majority in the National Assembly, he has to choose the leader of the opposition) but can only dismiss the Prime Minister if he/she has a majority in the National Assembly. The National Assembly can remove the Prime Minister from office with a vote of no confidence. The president can also dissolve the National Assembly once a year.) *
- Haiti
- Lithuania
- Madagascar
- Mali
- Mongolia
- Niger
- Northern Cyprus
- Poland
- Romania
- São Tomé and Príncipe
- Sri Lanka (Note: Following the 19th amendment, the Sri Lankan president can only appoint the prime minister following vacating of the position due to loss of confidence in Parliament, death or resignation. And does not hold the power to dismiss the prime minister at will.)
- Tunisia
- Ukraine
- Azerbaijan
- Congo, Republic of the
- Guinea-Bissau
- Kazakhstan
- Mauritania
- Mozambique
- Namibia
- Palestine
- Portugal
- Russia
- Syria
- Taiwan
- Transnistria
- Weimar Republic†

=== Parliamentary systems ===
- Botswana
- Kiribati
- Marshall Islands
- Nauru
- San Marino
- South Africa

=== Assembly independent ===
- Federated States of Micronesia
- Suriname
- Switzerland

=== Other ===
- Cuba
- Eritrea
- Laos
- Myanmar
- North Korea
- San Marino
- Vietnam

== Corporate example ==
In the corporate environment, the head of a company is the chief executive officer (CEO), with the president being second in command. Leading the company's executive group rather than the overall company, the executive president in this instance is responsible for day-to-day operations. In small businesses, the CEO and executive president are the same, whereas in larger companies the roles are carried out by two separate people.

== See also ==
- Parliamentary republics with an executive presidency
- Semi-presidential system
- Presidential system
- Corporate governance
