= Apportionment Act of 1911 =

United States Law passed by the 62nd Congress

- Long title: An Act For the apportionment of Representatives in Congress among the several States under the Thirteenth Census.
- Nicknames: Apportionment Act of 1911, Public Law 62-5
- Enacted by: the 62nd United States Congress
- Effective: March 4, 1913

Citations
- Public law: Pub. L. 62–5
- Statutes at Large: 37 Stat. 13

Codification
- Acts amended: Apportionment Act of 1901
- Titles amended: 2
- U.S.C. sections amended: 2 USC §2a

Legislative history
- Introduced in the House as H.R. 2983 by William C. Houston (D–TN) on April 10, 1911; Committee consideration by House Census; Passed the House on April 27, 1911; Passed the Senate on August 3, 1911; Signed into law by President William Howard Taft on August 8, 1911

Major amendments
- Reapportionment Act of 1929

United States Supreme Court cases
- Wood v. Broom, 287 U.S. 1 (1932); Connor v. Johnson, 402 U.S. 690 (1966); Department of Commerce v. Montana, 503 U.S. 442 (1992)

The Apportionment Act of 1911 (Pub. L. 62–5, 37 Stat. 13) was an apportionment bill passed by the United States Congress on August 8, 1911. The law initially set the number of members of the United States House of Representatives at 433, effective with the 63rd Congress on March 4, 1913. It also included, in section 2, a provision to add an additional seat for each of the anticipated new states of Arizona and New Mexico (which happened in 1912), bringing the total number of seats to 435.

== Previous apportionment ==
To give effect to the requirements of Article One, Section 2, Clause 3 of the United States Constitution and Section Two of the Fourteenth Amendment that United States representatives be apportioned to the states in proportion to their respective populations, Congress would pass Apportionment Acts following each Census, starting with the Apportionment Act of 1792.

Prior to the Apportionment Act of 1911, the Hamilton/Vinton (largest remainder) method was used in the apportionment of seats since 1850. In addition to setting the number of U.S. Representatives at 435, the Apportionment Act of 1911 returned to the Webster method of apportionment of U.S. Representatives.

== Text ==
Be it enacted by the Senate and House of Representatives of the United States of America in Congress assembled,

Section 1. That after the third day of March, nineteen hundred and thirteen, the House of Representatives shall be composed of four hundred and thirty-three Members, to be apportioned among the several States as follows:

Alabama, ten
Arkansas, seven
California, eleven
Colorado, four
Connecticut, five
Delaware, one
Florida, four
Georgia, twelve
Idaho, two
Illinois, twenty-seven
Indiana, thirteen
Iowa, eleven
Kansas, eight
Kentucky, eleven
Louisiana, eight
Maine, four

Maryland, six
Massachusetts, sixteen
Michigan, thirteen
Minnesota, ten
Mississippi, eight
Missouri, sixteen
Montana, two
Nebraska, six
Nevada, one
New Hampshire, two
New Jersey, twelve
New York, forty-three
North Carolina, ten
North Dakota, three
Ohio, twenty-two

Oklahoma, eight
Oregon, three
Pennsylvania, thirty-six
Rhode Island, three
South Carolina, seven
South Dakota, three
Tennessee, ten
Texas, eighteen
Utah, two
Vermont, two
Virginia, ten
Washington, five
West Virginia, six
Wisconsin, eleven
Wyoming, one

Section 2. That if the Territories of Arizona and New Mexico shall become States in the Union before the apportionment of Representatives under the next decennial census they shall have one Representative each, and if one of such Territories shall so become a State, such State shall have one Representative, which Representative or Representatives shall be in addition to the number four hundred and thirty-three, as provided in section one of this Act, and all laws and parts of laws in conflict with this section are to that extent hereby repealed.

Section 3. That in each State entitled under this apportionment to more than one Representative, the Representatives to the Sixty-third and each subsequent Congress shall be elected by districts composed of a contiguous and compact territory, and containing as nearly as practicable an equal number of inhabitants. The said districts shall be equal to the number of Representatives to which such State may be entitled in Congress, no district electing more than one Representative.

Section 4. That in case of an increase in the number of Representatives in any State under this apportionment such additional Representative or Representatives shall be elected by the State at large and the other Representatives by the districts now prescribed by law until such State shall be redistricted in the manner provided by the laws thereof and in accordance with the rules enumerated in section three of this Act; and if there be no change in the number of Representatives from a State, the Representatives thereof shall be elected from the districts now prescribed by law until such State shall be redistricted as herein prescribed.

Section 5. That candidates for Representative or Representatives to be elected at large in any State shall be nominated in the same manner as candidates for governor, unless otherwise provided by the laws of such State.

== Subsequent apportionment ==
For the first and only time, Congress failed to pass an apportionment act after the 1920 census. This left the allocations of the Act of 1911 in place until the 1930 census. The Reapportionment Act of 1929 established a method for reallocating seats among the states, given population shifts and the maximum of 435 representatives. A 1941 amendment to the 1929 act made the apportionment process self-executing after each decennial census. This lifted Congress's responsibility to pass an apportionment act for each census, and ensured that the events surrounding the 1920 census would not reoccur. The number of U.S. Representatives increased temporarily to 437 when Alaska and Hawaii were admitted as states in 1959 during the 86th Congress (seating one member from each of those states without changing the apportionment of the other seats). After the 1960 United States census and the 1962 election, the standard reapportionment brought the number back to 435.

== See also ==
- United States congressional apportionment
- Congressional Apportionment Amendment
- Redistricting
