= Cube root law =

Concept in political science

A visual representation of the cube-root law.

Zoomed in.

Zoomed in again.

The cube root law is an observation in political science that the number of members of a unicameral legislature, or of the lower house of a bicameral legislature, is about the cube root of the population being represented. The rule was devised by Estonian political scientist Rein Taagepera in his 1972 paper "The size of national assemblies".

The cube root law has been cited in proposals for legislative resizing in the United States and in the 2020 Italian constitutional referendum.

Large deviations between the data and the cube root curve, the inclusion of authoritarian governments in the data, as well as problems with how the cube root curve is derived from underlying postulates, have led researchers to question the cube root law.

== Derivation ==
Taagepera's theoretical model says that as the number of legislators expands, the number of constituents per legislator dwindles, and the two numbers must be reconciled. He assumed that for maximum effectiveness the two numbers should be equal. From this theoretical model he derived the equation
$$A=(2k)^{1/3}{P_0}^{1/3}$$
with $A$ as the number of legislators and $k$ as the politically active fraction of the total population $P_0$. Assuming that half of the population is politically active led to the simple equation with no coefficient:
$$A={P_0}^{1/3}$$

== Subsequent analysis ==
Giorgio Margaritondo argued in 2021 that fitting the cube-root equation to the experimental dataset originally used by Taagepera in 1972 leads to the equation:
$$A = 0.66{P_0}^{1/3}$$
This leads to the problematic result that the politically active population is 14%, which is too low. He said that although the cube root rule included governments that were corrupt, ineffective, or authoritarian, the rule has been misused as an argument for "optimal" legislature size. Actually, even Taagepera himself said, "there does not seem to be any clear difference in size (at equal population size) between assemblies which are considered representative and those which are considered to be of the rubber-stamp type." He said his model applies to both because "assemblies which are not used for interest aggregation may be used for transmitting government orders to the population." In 2012, researchers Emmanuelle Auriol and Robert J. Gary-Bobo derived a square-root law and empirically supported it from recent data for 100 countries. Margaritondo agreed that the data actually fits better to a function with a higher exponent, closer to a square-root law, and that the data's deviation from the cube root rule makes the cube root statistically inferior. In this regard, he gives an optimal formula of:
$$A = 0.1{P_0}^{0.45\pm0.03}$$
Margaritondo said that actually any power law equation would be so sensitive to the uncertainty in the exponent that the uncertainty in the result is large enough to accommodate most preferences.

Applying this formula to the U.S. House of Representatives as of the 2020 Census would give a House of between 379 and 1231 members, while using an exponent of 0.4507 gives 693 (the same result using the cube root rule).

In 2015 researchers Kristof Jacobs and Simon Otjes questioned the cause-effect sequence used to derive the cube root rule. Likewise Margaritondo said that Taagepera should have compared the number of constituents for one legislator with the same legislator's connections to other legislators instead of using the total connections between all legislators. Margaritondo said that the correct logic leads not to a cube-root law but a square-root law.

== Political proposals and referendums ==
The law has led to a proposal to increase the size of the United States House of Representatives so that the number of representatives would be the cube root of the US population as calculated in the most recent census. The House of Representatives has had 435 members since the Reapportionment Act of 1929 was passed; if the US followed the cube root rule, there would be 693 members of the House of Representatives based on the population at the 2020 Census. This proposal was endorsed by The New York Times editorial board in 2018.

The cube root law was used to support one side of the 2020 Italian constitutional referendum.

== Table comparing OECD nations in 2019 with EIU Democracy Index ranking ==
Out of the countries listed, Lithuania is the only one to exactly match the cube root rule. Moreover, Denmark, Canada, Ireland and Mexico come close to matching the rule, while the Netherlands and Australia are counterevidence against the rule.

Some of these countries (e.g. Germany) have overhang seats in a mixed member proportional system, as a result the size of their parliaments can vary significantly between elections.

Country	Lower or unicameral house	Population (2019)	Lower house size (2019)	Cube root of population (nearest person)	Difference between lower house and cube root of population	Difference between lower house and cube root of population (%)	People per representative	People per representative (cube root lower house)	Democracy Index Ranking (2022)
Australia	House of Representatives	25,364,307	151	294	−143	−49%	167,976	86,327	15
Austria	National Council	8,877,067	183	207	−24	−12%	48,509	42,873	20
Belgium	Chamber of Representatives	11,484,055	150	226	−76	−34%	76,560	50,901	36
Canada	House of Commons	37,589,262	338	335	+3	+1%	111,211	112,213	12
Chile	Chamber of Deputies	18,952,038	155	267	−112	−42%	122,271	71,084	19
Colombia	Chamber of Representatives	50,339,443	172	363	−191	−53%	303,250	136,334	53
Czech Republic	Chamber of Deputies	10,669,709	200	220	−20	−9%	53,349	48,466	25
Denmark	Folketing	5,818,553	179	180	−1	−1%	32,506	32,350	6
Estonia	Riigikogu	1,326,590	101	110	−9	−8%	13,135	12,073	27
Finland	Parliament	5,520,314	200	177	+23	+13%	27,602	31,235	5
France	National Assembly	67,059,887	577	406	+171	+42%	116,222	165,060	22
Germany	Bundestag	83,132,799	734	436	+298	+68%	113,260	190,480	14
Greece	Parliament	10,716,322	300	220	+80	+36%	35,721	48,607	25
Hungary	National Assembly	9,769,949	199	214	−15	−7%	49,095	45,701	56
Iceland	Althing	361,313	63	71	−8	−11%	5,735	5,073	3
Ireland	Dáil	5,123,536	174	172	+2	+1%	29,446	29,788	8
Israel	Knesset	9,053,300	120	208	−88	−42%	75,444	43,438	29
Italy	Chamber of Deputies	60,297,396	400	392	+8	+2%	150,743	153,768	34
Japan	House of Representatives	126,264,931	465	502	−37	−7%	271,537	251,684	16
Korea, Republic of	National Assembly	51,709,098	300	373	−73	−20%	172,384	138,796	24
Latvia	Saeima	1,912,789	100	124	−24	−19%	19,218	15,409	38
Lithuania	Seimas	2,786,844	141	141	0	0%	19,765	19,803	39
Luxembourg	Chamber of Deputies	619,896	60	85	−25	−29%	10,332	7,270	13
Mexico	Chamber of Deputies	127,575,529	500	503	−3	−1%	255,151	253,422	89
Netherlands	House of Representatives	17,332,850	150	259	−109	−42%	115,552	66,975	9
New Zealand	House of Representatives	4,917,000	120	170	−50	−29%	40,975	28,916	2
Norway	Storting	5,347,896	169	175	−6	−3%	31,644	30,581	1
Poland	Sejm	37,970,874	460	336	+124	+37%	82,545	112,971	46
Portugal	Assembly of the Republic	10,269,417	230	217	+13	+6%	44,650	47,246	28
Slovakia	National Council	5,454,073	150	176	−26	−15%	36,360	30,985	43
Slovenia	National Assembly	2,087,946	90	128	−38	−30%	23,199	16,336	31
Spain	Congress of Deputies	47,076,781	350	361	−11	−3%	134,505	130,378	22
Sweden	Riksdag	10,285,453	349	217	+132	+61%	29,471	47,295	4
Switzerland	National Council	8,574,832	200	205	−5	−2%	42,874	41,894	7
Turkey	Grand National Assembly	83,429,615	600	437	+163	+37%	139,049	190,933	103
United Kingdom	House of Commons	66,834,405	650	406	+244	+60%	102,822	164,690	18
United States	House of Representatives	328,239,523	435	690	−255	−37%	754,574	475,840	30

== Historical US House sizes ==
The following table describes how the US House of Representatives would have looked historically under the cube root rule according to the Huntington–Hill method.

Census, Year	Size	AL	AK	AZ	AR	CA	CO	CT	DE	DC	FL	GA	HI	ID	IL	IN	IA	KS	KY	LA	ME	MD	MA	MI	MN	MS	MO	MT	NE	NV	NH	NJ	NM	NY	NC	ND	OH	OK	OR	PA	RI	SC	SD	TN	TX	UT	VT	VA	WA	WV	WI	WY
1st, 1790	158							10	3			3										13	20								6	8		14	16					18	3	10						34				
2nd, 1800	175							8	2			5							7			12	19								6	7		20	16					20	2	12		4			5	30				
3rd, 1810	194							7	2			7							11			11	19								6	7		27	15		6			22	2	12		7			6	27				
4th, 1820	213	3						6	2			8			1	3			13	3	7	9	12			2					5	6		31	14		13			24	2	11		9			5	24				
5th, 1830	235	6						5	1			10			3	6			13	4	7	8	11			3	3				5	6		35	14		17			25	2	11		13			5	22				
6th, 1840	258	9			2			5	1			11			7	10			12	5	8	7	11	3		6	6				4	6		37	12		23			26	2	9		13			4	19				
7th, 1850	286	10			3	1		5	1		1	11			10	12	2		12	6	7	7	12	5		8	8				4	6		38	11		25			29	2	8		12	3		4	18			4	
8th, 1860	316	10			4	4		5	1		2	11			17	14	7		12	7	6	7	13	8	2	8	12				3	7		39	10		24		1	29	2	7		11	6		3	16			8	
9th, 1870	338	9			4	5		5	1		2	10			22	15	11	3	12	6	6	7	13	10	4	7	15		1	1	3	8		39	10		24		1	31	2	6		11	7		3	11		4	9	
10th, 1880	369	9			6	6	2	5	1		2	12			23	15	12	7	12	7	5	7	13	12	6	8	16		3	1	3	8		38	11		24		1	32	2	7		12	12		3	11		5	10	
11th, 1890	398	10			7	8	3	5	1		3	12		1	25	14	12	9	12	7	4	7	14	13	8	8	17	1	7	1	2	9		39	10	1	24		2	34	2	7	2	11	14		2	11	2	5	11	1
12th, 1900	426	10			7	8	3	5	1	2	3	13		1	27	14	13	8	12	8	4	7	16	14	10	9	18	1	6	1	2	11		41	11	2	24		2	36	2	8	2	11	17	2	2	11	3	5	12	1
13th, 1910	453	11			8	12	4	6	1	2	4	13		2	28	13	11	8	11	8	4	6	17	14	10	9	16	2	6	1	2	12		45	11	3	23	8	3	38	3	7	3	11	19	2	2	10	6	6	12	1
14th, 1920	475	11		2	8	15	4	6	1	2	4	13		2	29	13	11	8	11	8	3	6	17	16	11	8	15	3	6	1	2	14	2	46	11	3	26	9	4	39	3	8	3	10	21	2	2	10	6	7	12	1
15th, 1930	500	11		2	7	23	4	6	1	2	6	12		2	31	13	10	8	11	8	3	7	17	20	10	8	15	2	6	1	2	16	2	51	13	3	27	10	4	39	3	7	3	11	23	2	2	10	6	7	12	1
16th, 1940	512	11		2	8	27	4	7	1	3	7	12		2	31	13	10	7	11	9	3	7	17	20	11	9	15	2	5	1	2	16	2	52	14	3	27	9	4	39	3	7	3	11	25	2	1	10	7	7	12	1
17th, 1950	536	11		3	7	38	5	7	1	3	10	12		2	31	14	9	7	10	10	3	8	17	23	11	8	14	2	5	1	2	17	2	53	14	2	28	8	5	37	3	8	2	12	27	2	1	12	8	7	12	1
18th, 1960	566	10	1	4	6	49	6	8	1	2	16	12	2	2	32	15	9	7	10	10	3	10	16	25	11	7	14	2	4	1	2	19	3	53	14	2	31	7	6	36	3	8	2	11	30	3	1	12	9	6	12	1
19th, 1970	590	10	1	5	6	58	6	9	2	2	20	13	2	2	32	15	8	7	9	11	3	11	17	26	11	6	14	2	4	2	2	21	3	53	15	2	31	7	6	34	3	8	2	11	32	3	1	13	10	5	13	1
20th, 1980	612	11	1	7	6	64	8	8	2	2	26	15	3	3	31	15	8	6	10	11	3	11	16	25	11	7	13	2	4	2	3	20	4	48	16	2	29	8	7	32	3	8	2	12	38	4	1	14	11	5	13	1
21st, 1990	631	10	1	9	6	75	8	8	2	2	33	16	3	3	29	14	7	6	9	11	3	12	15	24	11	7	13	2	4	3	3	20	4	46	17	2	27	8	7	30	3	9	2	12	43	4	2	16	12	5	12	1
22nd, 2000	657	10	2	12	6	79	10	8	2	1	37	19	3	3	29	14	7	6	9	10	3	12	15	23	11	7	13	2	4	5	3	20	4	44	19	2	27	8	8	29	2	9	2	13	49	5	2	17	14	4	13	1
23rd, 2010	677	10	2	14	6	82	11	8	2	1	41	21	3	3	28	14	7	6	10	10	3	13	14	22	12	7	13	2	4	6	3	19	5	43	21	2	25	8	8	28	2	10	2	14	55	6	1	18	15	4	12	1
24th, 2020	695	11	2	15	6	83	12	8	2	2	45	22	3	4	27	14	7	6	9	10	3	13	15	21	12	6	13	2	4	7	3	19	4	42	22	2	25	8	9	27	2	11	2	15	61	7	1	18	16	4	12	1
Census, Year	Size	AL	AK	AZ	AR	CA	CO	CT	DE	DC	FL	GA	HI	ID	IL	IN	IA	KS	KY	LA	ME	MD	MA	MI	MN	MS	MO	MT	NE	NV	NH	NJ	NM	NY	NC	ND	OH	OK	OR	PA	RI	SC	SD	TN	TX	UT	VT	VA	WA	WV	WI	WY

== See also ==
- List of legislatures by number of members
- United States congressional apportionment
- Wyoming Rule
- Apportionment in the European Parliament
