= Congressional Apportionment Amendment =

Proposed amendment to the US Constitution

The Congressional Apportionment Amendment (also known as Article the First) is a proposed amendment to the United States Constitution that addresses the number of seats in the House of Representatives. It was proposed by Congress on September 25, 1789, but has not been ratified by the requisite number of state legislatures. As Congress did not set a time limit for its ratification, the Congressional Apportionment Amendment is still pending before the states. As of 2026, it is one of six unratified amendments.

Early in the 1st United States Congress, James Madison proposed a package of constitutional amendments designed to address the concerns of Anti-Federalists, who were suspicious of federal power under the new constitution. Congress approved 12 proposed amendments to the Constitution and sent them to the states for ratification. The Congressional Apportionment Amendment is the only one of those that has not been ratified. Ten amendments were ratified by December 1791, and are collectively called the Bill of Rights. An eleventh (Article the Second) was later ratified as the Twenty-seventh Amendment in May 1992. By the end of 1791, the Congressional Apportion Amendment was just one state short of adoption. However, no state has ratified the proposed amendment since 1792. Consequently, with 50 states now in the Union, ratification by an additional 27 states would be necessary for this amendment to come into force.

The amendment lays out a mathematical formula for determining the number of seats in the House of Representatives. It would initially have required one representative for every 30,000 constituents, with that number eventually climbing to one representative for every 50,000 constituents. However, there is some agreement that the last line contains a scrivener's error (see Mathematical discrepancies). As the amendment has not been ratified, Congress has set the size of the House of Representatives by statute. Congress regularly increased the size of the House to account for population growth throughout the 19th century until it fixed the number of voting House members at 435 in 1911, where aside from a temporary increase to 437 members from 1959 through 1962 after Alaska and Hawaii were admitted to the Union, it has remained.

The 2020 United States census recorded a population of 331.4 million; consequently, if the amendment were ratified today, it would (depending on the interpretation of the above error) result in a House of Representatives with at least 6,623 Representatives being required under the terms of the original House version of the amendment, more than twice the size of China's National People's Congress, the largest legislative body in the world.

== Text ==
After the first enumeration required by the first article of the Constitution, there shall be one Representative for every thirty thousand, until the number shall amount to one hundred, after which the proportion shall be so regulated by Congress, that there shall be not less than one hundred Representatives, nor less than one Representative for every forty thousand persons, until the number of Representatives shall amount to two hundred, after which the proportion shall be so regulated by Congress, that there shall not be less than two hundred Representatives, nor more than one Representative for every fifty thousand persons.

== Background ==
The "ideal" number of seats in the House of Representatives has been a contentious issue since the country's founding. Initially, delegates to the 1787 Constitutional Convention set the representation ratio at one representative for every 40,000 people. Upon the suggestion of George Washington, the ratio was changed to one representative for every 30,000 people. This was the only time Washington voiced an opinion on any of the actual issues debated during the convention.

In Federalist No. 55, James Madison argued that the size of the House of Representatives has to balance the ability of the body to legislate with the need for legislators to have a relationship close enough to the people to understand their local circumstances, that such representatives' social class be low enough to sympathize with the feelings of the mass of the people, and that their power be diluted enough to limit their abuse of the public trust and interests.

...first, that so small a number of representatives will be an unsafe depositary of the public interests; secondly, that they will not possess a proper knowledge of the local circumstances of their numerous constituents; thirdly, that they will be taken from that class of citizens which will sympathize least with the feelings of the mass of the people, and be most likely to aim at a permanent elevation of the few on the depression of the many;...

Anti-Federalists, who opposed the Constitution's ratification, noted that there was nothing in the document to guarantee that the number of seats in the House would continue to represent small constituencies as the general population of the states grew. They feared that over time, if the size remained relatively small and the districts became more expansive, that only well-known individuals with reputations spanning wide geographic areas could secure election. It was also feared that those in Congress would, as a result, have an insufficient sense of sympathy with and connectedness to ordinary people in their district.

This concern was evident in the various state ratifying conventions, where several specifically requested an amendment to secure a minimum size for the House of Representatives. Virginia's ratification resolution proposed

That there shall be one representative for every thirty thousand, according to the Enumeration or Census mentioned in the Constitution, until the whole number of representatives amounts to two hundred; after which that number shall be continued or encreased [sic] as the Congress shall direct, upon the principles fixed by the Constitution by apportioning the Representatives of each State to some greater number of people from time to time as population encreases [sic].

Anti-Federalist Melancton Smith declared at the New York ratifying convention that

We certainly ought to fix, in the Constitution, those things which are essential to liberty. If anything falls under this description, it is the number of the legislature.

Federalists, who supported the Constitution's ratification, reassured those opposing its ratification by agreeing that the new government should immediately address Anti-Federalist concerns and consider amending the Constitution. This reassurance was essential to the ratification of the new form of government.

== Legislative and ratification history ==
=== Legislative history ===
An amendment establishing a formula for determining the appropriate size of the House of Representatives and the appropriate apportionment of representatives among the states was one of several proposed amendments to the Constitution introduced first in the House on June 8, 1789, by Representative James Madison of Virginia:

That in Article I, Section 2, Clause 3, these words be struck out, to wit: "The number of Representatives shall not exceed one for every thirty thousand, but each State shall have at least one Representative, and until such enumeration shall be made;" and in place thereof be inserted these words, to wit: "After the first actual enumeration, there shall be one Representative for every thirty thousand, until the number amounts to—, after which the proportion shall be so regulated by Congress, that the number shall never be less than—, nor more than—, but each State shall, after the first enumeration, have at least two Representatives; and prior thereto".

This, along with Madison's other proposals, was referred to a committee consisting of one representative from each state. After Madison's proposals emerged from committee, Fisher Ames of Massachusetts, proposed a differing apportionment amendment in which the minimum apportionment ratio increased from 30,000 to 40,000 per Representative following a subsequent census. The change was approved on August 21, 1789. Then, on August 24, the House passed this plus sixteen other articles of amendment. The proposals next went to the Senate, which made 26 substantive alterations. On September 9, 1789, the Senate approved a package of twelve proposed amendments. Changed in this amendment was the apportionment formula to be followed once the number of House members reached 100.

A comparison of the two versions of the amendment
(The substitute Senate language and the affected House language are both in red.)

House version – August 24, 1789: After the first enumeration, required by the first Article of the Constitution, there shall be one Representative for every thirty thousand, until the number shall amount to one hundred, after which the proportion shall be so regulated by Congress, that there shall be not less than one hundred Representatives, nor less than one Representative for every forty thousand persons, until the number of Representatives shall amount to two hundred, after which the proportion shall be so regulated by Congress, that there shall not be less than two hundred Representatives, nor less than one Representative for every fifty thousand persons.	Senate version – September 9, 1789: After the first enumeration, required by the first article of the Constitution, there shall be one Representative for every thirty thousand, until the number shall amount to one hundred; to which number one Representative shall be added for every subsequent increase of forty thousand, until the Representatives shall amount to two hundred, to which number one Representative shall be added for every subsequent increase of sixty thousand persons.

On September 21, 1789, a conference committee convened to resolve the numerous differences between the two Bill of Rights proposals. On September 24, 1789, the committee issued its report that finalized 12 Constitutional amendments for the House and Senate to consider. Regarding the apportionment amendment, the House-passed version prevailed with one change: the final instance of the word "less" was changed to "more". The amendments were finally approved by both Houses on September 25, 1789.

=== Ratification history ===
States that ratified the amendment

Having been approved by Congress, the twelve Bill of Rights amendments were sent to the states for ratification. This proposed amendment was the first listed of the twelve and was ratified by the legislatures of the following states:

1. New Jersey: November 20, 1789
2. Maryland: December 19, 1789
3. North Carolina: December 22, 1789
4. South Carolina: January 19, 1790
5. New Hampshire: January 25, 1790
6. New York: February 24, 1790
7. Rhode Island: June 7, 1790
8. Pennsylvania: September 21, 1791 (after rejecting it on March 10, 1790)
9. Virginia: November 3, 1791
10. Vermont: November 3, 1791
11. Kentucky: June 27, 1792

The lower house of the Connecticut General Assembly approved the amendment along with ten others in October 1789, but the upper house of the Assembly deferred taking any action on the amendments until after the next election. In May 1790, following that election, the lower house rejected the amendment while approving the ten amendments that would become the Bill of Rights. The upper house then approved all 12 of the amendments, hindering Connecticut's ratification effort, as the two houses were subsequently unable to reconcile their divergent ratification resolutions.

When originally submitted to the states, nine ratifications would have made this amendment part of the Constitution. That number rose to ten on May 29, 1790, when Rhode Island ratified the Constitution. It rose to eleven on March 4, 1791, when Vermont joined the Union. By the end of 1791, the amendment was only one state short of adoption. However, when Kentucky attained statehood on June 1, 1792, the number of necessary ratifications climbed to twelve, and, even though Kentucky ratified the amendment that summer (along with the other eleven amendments), the measure was still one state short. No additional states ratified this amendment. With 50 states today, 27 additional ratifications are necessary to reach the required threshold of 38 ratifications needed for this amendment to become part of the Constitution.

== Mathematical discrepancies ==
Although the initial House and Senate versions of the amendment were clear in establishing a formula for determining the minimum number of representatives, the final version of the amendment was not. As a result of the last-minute "less" to "more" wording change made by the House, an inconsistency exists in the mathematical formula when the nation's population is between eight million and ten million, as the final version of the proposed amendment specifies a minimum number of House seats greater than the maximum. As a result, the amendment would be unworkable and any number of representatives unconstitutional. Albert Gallatin contradicted the concern that representation would be rendered unconstitutional by suggesting that the amendment made it clear that the change of representation of one per every 50,000 would not occur until the number of representatives exceeded 200, with representation remaining at 200 until population reached 10 million.

Historian David E. Kyvig had an alternative interpretation of the increase in the size of the U.S. House guaranteed by this proposed amendment. He claimed that the examples in the amendment were intended to demonstrate a mathematical relation: for every additional 100 members of Congress, district sizes would increase by 10,000 people. Under this interpretation, districts of 50,000 people would not have been intended as a ceiling, but, instead, the appropriate divisor until the House reached 300 members, at which point district sizes would be 60,000 until the House reached 400 members, and so on. Under this interpretation, there would be a minimum of 1,725 members of the House following the 2020 census, as opposed to the minimum of 6,623 members which would be required under the straightforward interpretation.

== See also ==
- Apportionment Act of 1792
- Reapportionment Act of 1929
- United States congressional apportionment
