= United States congressional apportionment =

How 435 seats are distributed to 50 states

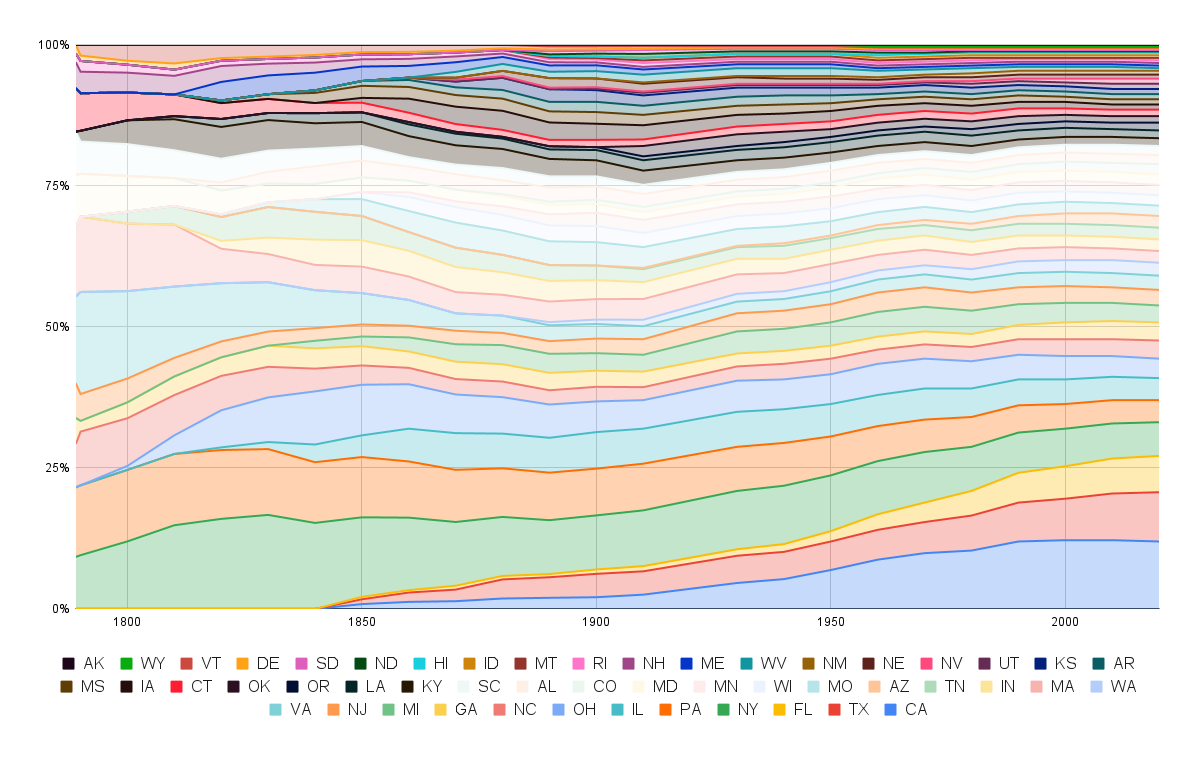
Allocation of seats by state, as percentage of overall number of representatives in the House, 1789–2020 census

United States congressional apportionment is the process by which seats in the United States House of Representatives are distributed among the 50 states according to the most recent decennial census mandated by the United States Constitution. After each state is guaranteed a minimum of one seat in the House, most states are then apportioned a number of additional seats which roughly corresponds to its share of the aggregate population of the 50 states. Every state is constitutionally guaranteed two seats in the Senate and at least one seat in the House, regardless of population.

The U.S. House of Representatives' maximum number of seats has been limited to 435, capped at that number by the Reapportionment Act of 1929—except for a temporary (1959–1962) increase to 437 when Alaska and Hawaii were admitted into the Union. The Huntington–Hill method of equal proportions has been used to distribute the seats among the states since the 1940 census reapportionment. Federal law requires the clerk of the United States House of Representatives to notify each state government of the number of seats apportioned to the state no later than January 25 of the year immediately following each decennial census.

The size of a state's total congressional delegation (which in addition to representative(s) includes 2 senators for each state) also determines the size of its representation in the U.S. Electoral College, which elects the U.S. president.

== Constitutional context ==
Apportionment in the United States involves dividing the 435 voting seats every ten years. As per Article One of the United States Constitution, elections to the House of Representatives are held every two years, and the numbers of delegates are apportioned amongst the states according to their relative populations. The Constitution itself makes no mention of districts.

The U.S. Constitution does not specify how apportionment is to be conducted and multiple methods have been developed and utilized since the Article's inception, such as the Jefferson, Hamilton and Webster methods. The Jefferson method was first utilized in 1792 after the first decennial census was conducted in 1790 but was abandoned in 1840 as it favoured larger states such as Virginia, Thomas Jefferson's home state and the most influential state at the time. Hamilton's method was used intermittently for the next half-century and was eventually replaced by Webster's as the Hamilton method resulted in population paradoxes when the House size increased. After the House size and number of congressional districts were fixed in 1941, the Huntington–Hill method became the official method of apportionment and was used in the 2020 apportionment and redistricting cycle. The current method solves many of the issues concerning previous methods; however, it still violates the "one person, one vote" rule established in Wesberry v. Sanders (1964) due to systematic bias which gives more representation and power to small states than to residents of large states.

These methods have been the subject of debate for over 200 years as losing or gaining a seat affects representation which is the source of political power. Congressional districts are subject to the Equal Protection Clause and it is expected that they apportion congressional districts closer to mathematical equality than state legislative districts. The U.S Supreme Court in Karcher v. Daggett (1983) rejected New Jersey's congressional redistricting plans due to a deviation of less than 1%.

Article One, Section 2, Clause 3 of the United States Constitution initially provided:

Representatives and direct Taxes shall be apportioned among the several States which may be included within this Union, according to their respective Numbers, which shall be determined by adding to the whole Number of free Persons, including those bound to Service for a Term of Years, and excluding Indians not taxed, three fifths of all other Persons. The Number of Representatives shall not exceed one for every thirty Thousand, but each State shall have at least one Representative;…

The phrase "all other persons" refers to slaves, a word not used in the Constitution until the Thirteenth Amendment.

Following the end of the Civil War, the first of those provisions was superseded by Section 2 of the Fourteenth Amendment:

Representatives shall be apportioned among the several States according to their respective numbers, counting the whole number of persons in each State, excluding Indians not taxed. But when the right to vote at any election for the choice of electors for President and Vice-President of the United States, Representatives in Congress, the Executive and Judicial officers of a State, or the members of the Legislature thereof, is denied to any of the male inhabitants of such State, being twenty-one years of age, and citizens of the United States, or in any way abridged, except for participation in rebellion, or other crime, the basis of representation therein shall be reduced in the proportion which the number of such male citizens shall bear to the whole number of male citizens twenty-one years of age in such State.

The phrase "counting the whole number of persons in each State" has traditionally been understood to include non-citizens for purposes of apportionment.

== Reapportionment ==
Reapportionments normally occur following each decennial census, though the law that governs the total number of representatives and the method of apportionment to be carried into force at that time are enacted prior to the census.

The decennial apportionment also determines the size of each state's representation in the U.S. Electoral College. Under Article II, Section 1, Clause 2 of the U.S. Constitution, the number of electors of any state equals the size of its total congressional delegation (House and Senate seats).

Federal law requires the Clerk of the House of Representatives to notify each state government no later than January 25 of the year immediately following the census of the number of seats to which it is entitled. Whether or not the number of seats has changed, the state determines the boundaries of congressional districts—geographical areas within the state of approximately equal population—in a process called redistricting.

Because the deadline for the House Clerk to report the results does not occur until the following January, and the states need sufficient time to perform the redistricting, the decennial census does not affect the elections that are held during that same year. For example, the electoral college apportionment and congressional races during the 2020 presidential election year were still based on the 2010 census results; all of the newly redrawn districts based on the 2020 census did not finally come into force until the 2022 midterm election winners were inaugurated in January 2023.

== Number of members ==
The U.S. population has increased more rapidly than the membership of the House of Representatives from 1793 to 2023.

The size of the U.S. House of Representatives refers to the total number of congressional districts (or seats) into which the land area of the United States proper has been divided. The number of voting representatives is currently set at 435. There are an additional five delegates to the House of Representatives. They represent the District of Columbia and the territories of American Samoa, Guam, the Northern Mariana Islands, which first elected a representative in 2008, and the U.S. Virgin Islands. Puerto Rico also elects a resident commissioner every four years.

=== Controversy and history ===
Since 1789, when the United States Congress first convened under the Constitution, the number of citizens per congressional district has risen from an average of 33,000 in 1790 to over 700,000 as of 2018. Prior to the 20th century, the number of representatives increased every decade as more states joined the union, and the population increased.

Representation in the House, historical
Starting year^{Y}	Source	Avg. constituents per member
1793	1790 census	34,436
1803	1800 census	34,609
1813	1810 census	36,377
1823	1820 census	42,124
1833	1830 census	49,712
1843	1840 census	71,338
1853	1850 census	93,020
1863	1860 census	122,614
1873	1870 census	130,533
1883	1880 census	151,912
1893	1890 census	173,901
1903	1900 census	193,167
1913	1910 census	210,583
1923	1920 census	243,728
1933	1930 census	280,675
1943	1940 census	301,164
1953	1950 census	334,587
1963	1960 census	410,481
1973	1970 census	469,088
1983	1980 census	510,818
1993	1990 census	571,477
2003	2000 census	646,946
2013	2010 census	709,760
2023	2020 census	761,169
^{Y}Elections are held the preceding year

The ideal number of members has been a contentious issue since the country's founding. George Washington agreed that the original representation proposed during the Constitutional Convention (one representative for every 40,000) was inadequate and supported an alteration to reduce that number to 30,000. This was the only time that Washington pronounced an opinion on any of the actual issues debated during the entire convention. Five years later, Washington was so insistent on having no more than 30,000 constituents per representative that he exercised the first presidential veto in history on a bill which allowed half states to go over the quota.

In Federalist No. 55, James Madison argued that the size of the House of Representatives has to balance the ability of the body to legislate with the need for legislators to have a relationship close enough to the people to understand their local circumstances, that such representatives' social class be low enough to sympathize with the feelings of the mass of the people, and that their power be diluted enough to limit their abuse of the public trust and interests.

... first, that so small a number of representatives will be an unsafe depositary of the public interests; secondly, that they will not possess a proper knowledge of the local circumstances of their numerous constituents; thirdly, that they will be taken from that class of citizens which will sympathize least with the feelings of the mass of the people, and be most likely to aim at a permanent elevation of the few on the depression of the many; ...

Madison also addressed Anti-Federalist claims that the representation would be inadequate, arguing that the major inadequacies are of minimal inconvenience since these will be cured rather quickly by virtue of decennial reapportionment. He noted, however,

I take for granted here what I shall, in answering the fourth objection, hereinafter show, that the number of representatives will be augmented from time to time in the manner provided by the Constitution. On a contrary supposition, I should admit the objection to have very great weight indeed.

Madison argued against the assumption that more is better:

Sixty or seventy men may be more properly trusted with a given degree of power than six or seven. But it does not follow that six or seven hundred would be proportionally a better depositary. And if we carry on the supposition to six or seven thousand, the whole reasoning ought to be reversed. ... In all very numerous assemblies, of whatever character composed, passion never fails to wrest the scepter from reason.

==== Global comparison and disparities ====
When talking about the populations within California's reapportioned House districts in 1951, a report from Duke University found that "[there] is not an excessive disparity in district populations, but [the populations and disparities are] perhaps larger than necessary." If the House had a similar ratio of representatives to constituents as it did after the 1930 United States census, it would currently have 1,156 members (still just the second largest lower house, after China).

The United States has unusually large constituencies compared to other OECD countries, the third largest in the world. However, most of this is caused by the United States's large population, which is the third-largest in the world; legislatures typically grow in proportion to the cube root of the population, rather than linearly, meaning larger countries tend to have larger constituency sizes.

=== Membership cap ===
The Apportionment Act of 1911 (Public Law 62-5) raised the membership of the U.S. House to 433 and provided for an apportionment. It also provided for additional seats upon the admissions of Arizona and New Mexico as states, increasing the number to 435 in 1912.

In 1921, Congress failed to reapportion the House membership as required by the United States Constitution. This failure to reapportion may have been politically motivated, as the newly elected Republican majority may have feared the effect such a reapportionment would have on their future electoral prospects. A reapportionment in 1921 in the traditional fashion would have increased the size of the House to 483 seats, but many members would have lost their seats due to the population shifts, and the House chamber did not have adequate seats for 483 members. By 1929, no reapportionment had been made since 1911, and there was vast representational inequity, measured by the average district size. By 1929 some states had districts twice as large as others due to population growth and demographic shift.

In 1929 Congress (with Republican control of both houses of Congress and the presidency) passed the Reapportionment Act of 1929 which capped the size of the House at 435 and established a permanent method for apportioning a constant 435 seats. This cap has remained unchanged since then, except for a temporary increase to 437 members (twice, in 1959 and 1961) upon the 1959 admission of Alaska and Hawaii into the Union.

Two states, Wyoming and Vermont, have populations smaller than the average for a single district, although neither state has fewer people than the least populous congressional districts.

=== Proposed expansion ===
Among the Bill of Rights amendments to the United States Constitution proposed by Congress in 1789, was one addressing the number of seats in the House. It attempted to set a pattern for growth of the House along with the population, but has not been ratified.

After the first enumeration required by the first article of the Constitution, there shall be one Representative for every thirty thousand, until the number shall amount to one hundred, after which the proportion shall be so regulated by Congress, that there shall be not less than one hundred Representatives, nor less than one Representative for every forty thousand persons, until the number of Representatives shall amount to two hundred; after which the proportion shall be so regulated by Congress, that there shall not be less than two hundred Representatives, nor more than one Representative for every fifty thousand persons.

Taken at face-value, with the nation's population reaching approximately 308.7 million according to the 2010 census, the proposed amendment would have called for an up-to 6,000-member House. However, in the context of its original construction, the amendment may have instead outlined an iterative procedure for apportionment following a square root rule relative to the population (e.g. $Representatives \approx \sqrt{10000+Population/100} - 100$) that would still have called for a more than 1,600-member House following the same 2010 census.

One proposal to alleviate the current constituency disparities and the high average number of constituents in many states' congressional districts is the "Wyoming rule." Operating similar to New Zealand's method of allocation for proportional representation, it would give the least populous state (which has been Wyoming since 1990) one representative and then create districts in other states with the same population.

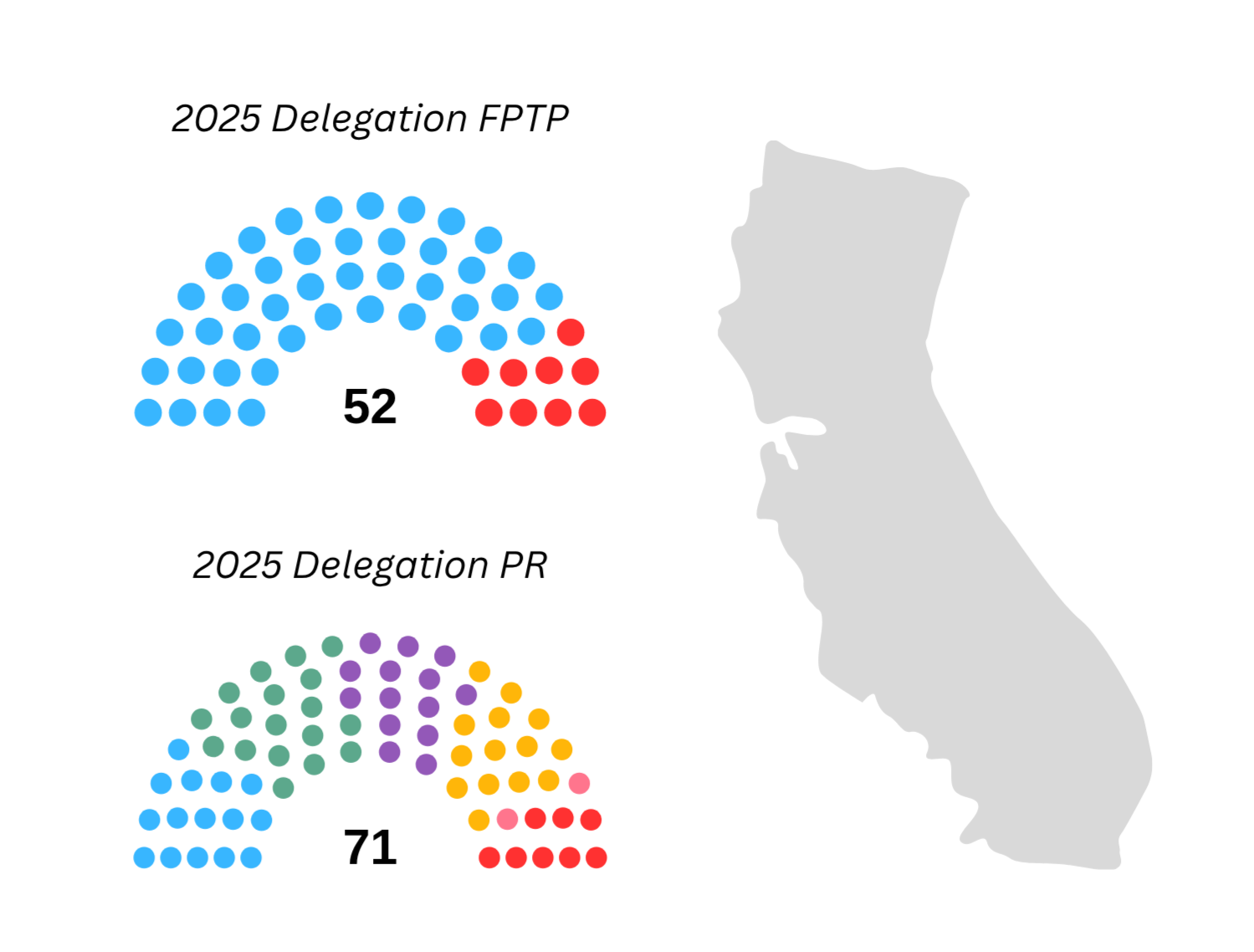
Some advocates for expanding the House include the adoption of proportional representation, which could introduce more parties into Congress. Lee Drutman's proposed CA delegation uses the cube root rule.

Another proposed expansion rule, the cube root rule, calls for the membership of the legislature to be based on the cube root (rounded up) of the U.S. population at the last census. For example, such a rule would call for 692 members of the House based on the 2020 United States census. An additional House member would be added each time the national population exceeds the next cube; in this case, the next House member would be added when the census population reached 331,373,889, and the one after that at 332,812,558. A variation would split the representation between the House and the Senate, e.g. 592 members in the House (692 − 100 senators).

On May 21, 2001, Rep. Alcee Hastings sent a dear colleague letter pointing out that U.S. expansion of its legislature had not kept pace with other countries.

In 2007, during the 110th Congress, Representative Tom Davis introduced a bill in the House of Representatives that would add two seats to the House, one for Utah and one for the District of Columbia. It was passed by the House, but was tripped up by procedural hurdles in the Senate and withdrawn from consideration. An identical bill was reintroduced during the 110th Congress. In February 2009 the Senate adopted the measure 61–37. In April 2010, however, House leaders decided to shelve the proposal.

Two provisions of Section 102, subsection (d) in the Washington, D.C., Admission Act by delegate Eleanor Holmes Norton and its same-titled Senate companion by Sen. Tom Carper, both introduced in 2021 and again in 2023 during the 117th and 118th Congresses, seek to amend Section 22(a) of the Reapportionment Act by adding one to the permanent House membership for a total of 436 representatives as the state of Washington, Douglass Commonwealth (i.e., Washington, D.C.) would have been entitled to an at-large district. Holmes Norton's bill previously passed the House during the 116th Congress but not the Senate.

== Apportionment methods ==
Apportionment in the House of the US population, 2010–2019
State	Population percent		House percent	
State	2019	2010	2019 (Note: 2019 numbers are calculations from estimated population data)	2010
California	12.06%	12.09%	11.95%	12.18%
Texas	8.85%	8.16%	8.74%	8.28%
Florida	6.56%	6.10%	6.44%	6.21%
New York	5.94%	6.29%	5.98%	6.21%
Pennsylvania	3.91%	4.12%	3.91%	4.14%
Illinois	3.87%	4.16%	3.91%	4.14%
Ohio	3.57%	3.74%	3.68%	3.68%
Georgia	3.24%	3.14%	3.22%	3.22%
North Carolina	3.20%	3.09%	3.22%	2.99%
Michigan	3.05%	3.21%	2.99%	3.22%
New Jersey	2.71%	2.85%	2.76%	2.76%
Virginia	2.61%	2.60%	2.53%	2.53%
Washington	2.32%	2.18%	2.30%	2.30%
Arizona	2.22%	2.07%	2.30%	2.07%
Massachusetts	2.10%	2.12%	2.07%	2.07%
Tennessee	2.09%	2.06%	2.07%	2.07%
Indiana	2.06%	2.10%	2.07%	2.07%
Missouri	1.87%	1.94%	1.84%	1.84%
Maryland	1.85%	1.87%	1.84%	1.84%
Wisconsin	1.78%	1.85%	1.84%	1.84%
Colorado	1.76%	1.63%	1.84%	1.61%
Minnesota	1.72%	1.72%	1.61%	1.84%
South Carolina	1.57%	1.50%	1.61%	1.61%
Alabama	1.50%	1.55%	1.61%	1.61%
Louisiana	1.42%	1.47%	1.38%	1.38%
Kentucky	1.36%	1.41%	1.38%	1.38%
Oregon	1.29%	1.24%	1.38%	1.15%
Oklahoma	1.21%	1.22%	1.15%	1.15%
Connecticut	1.09%	1.16%	1.15%	1.15%
Utah	0.98%	0.90%	0.92%	0.92%
Iowa	0.96%	0.99%	0.92%	0.92%
Nevada	0.94%	0.88%	0.92%	0.92%
Arkansas	0.92%	0.95%	0.92%	0.92%
Mississippi	0.91%	0.96%	0.92%	0.92%
Kansas	0.89%	0.93%	0.92%	0.92%
New Mexico	0.64%	0.67%	0.69%	0.69%
Nebraska	0.59%	0.59%	0.69%	0.69%
West Virginia	0.55%	0.60%	0.46%	0.69%
Idaho	0.55%	0.51%	0.46%	0.46%
Hawaii	0.43%	0.44%	0.46%	0.46%
New Hampshire	0.42%	0.43%	0.46%	0.46%
Maine	0.41%	0.43%	0.46%	0.46%
Montana	0.33%	0.32%	0.46%	0.23%
Rhode Island	0.32%	0.34%	0.23%	0.46%
Delaware	0.30%	0.29%	0.23%	0.23%
South Dakota	0.27%	0.26%	0.23%	0.23%
North Dakota	0.23%	0.22%	0.23%	0.23%
Alaska	0.22%	0.23%	0.23%	0.23%
Vermont	0.19%	0.20%	0.23%	0.23%
Wyoming	0.18%	0.18%	0.23%	0.23%

Apart from the requirement that each state is to be entitled to at least one representative in the House of Representatives, the number of representatives in each state is in principle to be proportional to its population. Since the adoption of the Constitution, five distinct apportionment methods have been used.

Partisan control of congressional redistricting after the 2020 elections, with the number of U.S. House seats each state will receive. Democratic control Republican control Split or bipartisan control Independent redistricting commission No redistricting necessary

The first apportionment was contained in Art. I, § 2, cl. 3 of the Constitution. After the first census in 1790, Congress passed the Apportionment Act of 1792 and adopted the Jefferson method to apportion U.S. representatives to the states based on population. The Jefferson method required fractional remainders to be discarded when calculating each state's total number of U.S. representatives and was used until the 1830 census. The Webster method, proposed in 1832 by Daniel Webster and adopted for the 1840 census, allocated an additional representative to states with a fractional remainder greater than 0.5.

From 1850 to 1900, the situation was substantially less clear. Congress passed a law in 1850 declaring future apportionment would be done with Hamilton's method. However, Congress continued to pass ad hoc apportionment bills from 1850 through 1900, in each case overruling the procedure laid out in the 1850 census. This was particularly true after the 1860 Census: the national situation was complicated by the Civil War, and no real apportionment method was used. Apart from 1860, Congress deliberately chose after each census to set the size of the House at a level where Hamilton and Webster's methods gave the same apportionment. This unofficial adoption of Webster's method was driven by the discovery of the Alabama paradox, which created an uproar in the House. The Apportionment Act of 1911, in addition to setting the number of U.S. representatives at 435, returned to the Webster method, which was used following the 1910 and 1930 censuses (no reapportionment was done after the 1920 census). The current method, known as the Huntington–Hill method or method of equal proportions, was adopted in 1941 for reapportionment based on the 1940 census and beyond. The revised method was necessary in the context of the cap on the number of representatives set in the Reapportionment Act of 1929.

=== Method of equal proportions ===
The apportionment method currently used is the method of equal proportions, which minimizes the percentage differences in the number of people per representative among the different states. The resulting apportionment is optimal in the sense that any additional transfer of a seat from one state to another would result in larger percentage differences.

In this method, as a first step, each of the 50 states is given its one guaranteed seat in the House of Representatives, leaving 385 seats to assign. The remaining seats are allocated one at a time, to the state with the highest priority number. Thus, the 51st seat would go to the most populous state (currently California). The priority number is determined by the ratio of the state population to the geometric mean of the number of seats it currently holds in the assignment process, n (initially 1), and the number of seats it would hold if the seat were assigned to it, n+1. Symbolically, the priority number A_{n} is

$$A_{n} = \frac{P}{\sqrt{n(n+1)}}$$

where P is the population of the state, and n is the number of seats it currently holds before the possible allocation of the next seat. An equivalent, recursive definition is

$$A_{m+1} = \sqrt{\frac{m}{m+2}} \ A_{m}$$
$$A_{n} = \sqrt{\frac{n-1}{n+1}} \ A_{n-1}$$

where n is still the number of seats the state has before allocation of the next (in other words, for the mth allocation, n = m-1).

Consider the reapportionment following the 2010 U.S. census: beginning with all states initially being allocated one seat, the largest value of A_{1} corresponds to the largest state, California, which is allocated seat 51. After being allocated its 2nd seat, its priority value decreases to its A_{2} value, which is reordered to a position back in line. The 52nd seat goes to Texas, the 2nd largest state, because its A_{1} priority value is larger than the A_{n} of any other state. However, the 53rd seat goes back to California because its A_{2} priority value is larger than the A_{n} of any other state. The 54th seat goes to New York because its A_{1} priority value is larger than the A_{n} of any other state at this point. This process continues until all remaining seats are assigned. Each time a state is assigned a seat, n is incremented by 1, causing its priority value to be reduced and reordered among the states, whereupon another state normally rises to the top of the list.

The 2010 census ranking of priority values shows the order in which seats 51–435 were apportioned after the 2010 census, with additional listings for the next five priorities. Minnesota was allocated the final (435th) seat. North Carolina missed its 14th seat by 15,754 residents as the 436th seat to be allocated; ten years earlier it had gained its 13th seat as the 435th seat to be allocated based on the 2000 census.

The 2020 census ranking of priority values shows the order in which seats 51–435 were apportioned after the 2020 census, with additional listings for the next ten priorities. For the second time in a row, Minnesota was allocated the final (435th) seat. If either New York had registered 89 more residents or Minnesota had registered 26 fewer residents, New York would have been allocated the 435th seat instead.

== Past apportionments ==
Note: The first apportionment was established by the Constitution based on population estimates made by the Philadelphia Convention, and was not based on any census or enumeration.

Bold indicates the largest number of representatives each state has had.

Statehood order	Census	Const.	1st	2nd	3rd	4th	5th	6th	7th	8th	9th	10th	11th	12th	13th	15th (Note: Congress failed to pass any reapportionment to implement the 1920 United States census so despite population shift, distribution of seats from 1913 remained in effect until 1933.)	16th	17th	18th	19th	20th	21st	22nd	23rd	24th
Statehood order	Year	1789	1790	1800	1810	1820	1830	1840	1850	1860	1870	1880	1890	1900	1910	1930	1940	1950	1960	1970	1980	1990	2000	2010	2020
Statehood order	Effected	1789	1793	1803	1813	1823	1833	1843	1853	1863	1873	1883	1893	1903	1913	1933	1943	1953	1963	1973	1983	1993	2003	2013	2023
Statehood order	Size	65	105	142	182	213	240	223	234	241	292	325	356	386	435										
Statehood order	State																								
22	AL	–	–	–	–	3	5	7	7	6	8	8	9	9	**10**	9	9	9	8	7	7	7	7	7	7
49	AK	–	–	–	–	–	–	–	–	–	–	–	–	–	–	–	–	–	**1**	**1**	**1**	**1**	**1**	**1**	**1**
48	AZ	–	–	–	–	–	–	–	–	–	–	–	–	–	1	1	2	2	3	4	5	6	8	**9**	**9**
25	AR	–	–	–	–	–	–	1	2	3	4	5	6	**7**	**7**	**7**	**7**	6	4	4	4	4	4	4	4
31	CA	–	–	–	–	–	–	–	2	3	4	6	7	8	11	20	23	30	38	43	45	52	**53**	**53**	52
38	CO	–	–	–	–	–	–	–	–	–	–	1	2	3	4	4	4	4	4	5	6	6	7	7	**8**
5	CT	5	**7**	**7**	**7**	6	6	4	4	4	4	4	4	5	5	6	6	6	6	6	6	6	5	5	5
1	DE	1	1	1	**2**	1	1	1	1	1	1	1	1	1	1	1	1	1	1	1	1	1	1	1	1
27	FL	–	–	–	–	–	–	–	1	1	2	2	2	3	4	5	6	8	12	15	19	23	25	27	**28**
4	GA	3	2	4	6	7	9	8	8	7	9	10	11	11	12	10	10	10	10	10	10	11	13	**14**	**14**
50	HI	–	–	–	–	–	–	–	–	–	–	–	–	–	–	–	–	–	**2**	**2**	**2**	**2**	**2**	**2**	**2**
43	ID	–	–	–	–	–	–	–	–	–	–	–	1	1	**2**	**2**	**2**	**2**	**2**	**2**	**2**	**2**	**2**	**2**	**2**
21	IL	–	–	–	–	1	3	7	9	14	19	20	22	25	**27**	**27**	26	25	24	24	22	20	19	18	17
19	IN	–	–	–	–	3	7	10	11	11	**13**	**13**	**13**	**13**	**13**	12	11	11	11	11	10	10	9	9	9
29	IA	–	–	–	–	–	–	–	2	6	9	**11**	**11**	**11**	**11**	9	8	8	7	6	6	5	5	4	4
34	KS	–	–	–	–	–	–	–	–	1	3	7	**8**	**8**	**8**	7	6	6	5	5	5	4	4	4	4
15	KY	–	2	6	10	12	**13**	10	10	9	10	11	11	11	11	9	9	8	7	7	7	6	6	6	6
18	LA	–	–	–	1	3	3	4	4	5	6	6	6	7	**8**	**8**	**8**	**8**	**8**	**8**	**8**	7	7	6	6
23	ME	–	–	–	–	7	**8**	7	6	5	5	4	4	4	4	3	3	3	2	2	2	2	2	2	2
7	MD	6	8	**9**	**9**	**9**	8	6	6	5	6	6	6	6	6	6	6	7	8	8	8	8	8	8	8
6	MA	8	14	17	**20**	13	12	10	11	10	11	12	13	14	16	15	14	14	12	12	11	10	10	9	9
26	MI	–	–	–	–	–	–	3	4	6	9	11	12	12	13	17	17	18	**19**	**19**	18	16	15	14	13
32	MN	–	–	–	–	–	–	–	–	2	3	5	7	9	**10**	9	9	9	8	8	8	8	8	8	8
20	MS	–	–	–	–	1	2	4	5	5	6	7	7	**8**	**8**	7	7	6	5	5	5	5	4	4	4
24	MO	–	–	–	–	1	2	5	7	9	13	14	15	**16**	**16**	13	13	11	10	10	9	9	9	8	8
41	MT	–	–	–	–	–	–	–	–	–	–	–	1	1	**2**	**2**	**2**	**2**	**2**	**2**	**2**	1	1	1	**2**
37	NE	–	–	–	–	–	–	–	–	–	1	3	**6**	**6**	**6**	5	4	4	3	3	3	3	3	3	3
36	NV	–	–	–	–	–	–	–	–	–	1	1	1	1	1	1	1	1	1	1	2	2	3	**4**	**4**
9	NH	3	4	5	**6**	**6**	5	4	3	3	3	2	2	2	2	2	2	2	2	2	2	2	2	2	2
3	NJ	4	5	6	6	6	6	5	5	5	7	7	8	10	12	14	14	14	**15**	**15**	14	13	13	12	12
47	NM	–	–	–	–	–	–	–	–	–	–	–	–	–	1	1	2	2	2	2	**3**	**3**	**3**	**3**	**3**
11	NY	6	10	17	27	34	40	34	33	31	33	34	34	37	43	**45**	**45**	43	41	39	34	31	29	27	26
12	NC	5	10	12	13	13	13	9	8	7	8	9	9	10	10	11	12	12	11	11	11	12	13	13	**14**
39	ND	–	–	–	–	–	–	–	–	–	–	–	1	2	**3**	2	2	2	2	1	1	1	1	1	1
17	OH	–	–	1	6	14	19	21	21	19	20	21	21	21	22	**24**	23	23	**24**	23	21	19	18	16	15
46	OK	–	–	–	–	–	–	–	–	–	–	–	–	–	8	**9**	8	6	6	6	6	6	5	5	5
33	OR	–	–	–	–	–	–	–	–	1	1	1	2	2	3	3	4	4	4	4	5	5	5	5	**6**
2	PA	8	13	18	23	26	28	24	25	24	27	28	30	32	**36**	34	33	30	27	25	23	21	19	18	17
13	RI	1	2	2	2	2	2	2	2	2	2	2	2	2	**3**	2	2	2	2	2	2	2	2	2	2
8	SC	5	6	8	**9**	**9**	**9**	7	6	4	5	7	7	7	7	6	6	6	6	6	6	6	6	7	7
40	SD	–	–	–	–	–	–	–	–	–	–	–	2	2	**3**	2	2	2	2	2	1	1	1	1	1
16	TN	–	–	3	6	9	**13**	11	10	8	10	10	10	10	10	9	10	9	9	8	9	9	9	9	9
28	TX	–	–	–	–	–	–	–	2	4	6	11	13	16	18	21	21	22	23	24	27	30	32	36	**38**
45	UT	–	–	–	–	–	–	–	–	–	–	–	–	1	2	2	2	2	2	2	3	3	3	**4**	**4**
14	VT	–	2	4	**6**	5	5	4	3	3	3	2	2	2	2	1	1	1	1	1	1	1	1	1	1
10	VA	10	19	22	**23**	22	21	15	13	11	9	10	10	10	10	9	9	10	10	10	10	11	11	11	11
42	WA	–	–	–	–	–	–	–	–	–	–	–	2	3	5	6	6	7	7	7	8	9	9	**10**	**10**
35	WV	–	–	–	–	–	–	–	–	–	3	4	4	5	**6**	**6**	**6**	**6**	5	4	4	3	3	3	2
30	WI	–	–	–	–	–	–	–	3	6	8	9	10	**11**	**11**	10	10	10	10	9	9	9	8	8	8
44	WY	–	–	–	–	–	–	–	–	–	–	–	**1**	**1**	**1**	**1**	**1**	**1**	**1**	**1**	**1**	**1**	**1**	**1**	**1**

== Changes per census ==
=== 2010 ===
On December 21, 2010, the U.S. Census Bureau released its official apportionment results for congressional representation. The changes were in effect for the U.S. elections in 2012.

Gain four	Gain two	Gain one	No change	Lose one	Lose two
1. Texas	1. Florida	1. Arizona; 2. Georgia; 3. Nevada; 4. South Carolina; 5. Utah; 6. Washington	(32 states)	1. Illinois; 2. Iowa; 3. Louisiana; 4. Massachusetts; 5. Michigan; 6. Missouri; 7. New Jersey; 8. Pennsylvania	1. New York; 2. Ohio
+4	+2	+6		−8	−4
+12 seats gained total				−12 seats lost total	
Allocation of congressional districts after the 2010 U.S. census

=== 2020 ===
Apportionment results were released on April 26, 2021:

Gain two	Gain one	No change	Lose one
1. Texas	1. Colorado; 2. Florida; 3. Montana; 4. North Carolina; 5. Oregon	(37 states)	1. California; 2. Illinois; 3. Michigan; 4. New York; 5. Ohio; 6. Pennsylvania; 7. West Virginia
+2	+5		−7
+7 seats gained total			−7 seats lost total
Allocation of congressional districts in the House of Representatives after the 2020 U.S. census

The changes took effect in the U.S. elections in 2024.

== List of apportionments ==
The size of the U.S. House of Representatives has increased and decreased as follows:

Effective date	Size	Change	Legal provision	Reason and/or comments
March 4, 1789	59	n/a	Const. Art. I, § 2, cl. 3	Seats apportioned by the Constitution based on population estimates made by the Philadelphia Convention. Only 11 of the original 13 states had ratified the Constitution by this time.
November 21, 1789	64	▲5	Const. Art. I, § 2, cl. 3	North Carolina ratified the Constitution with the seats apportioned by the Constitution.
May 29, 1790	65	▲1	Const. Art. I, § 2, cl. 3	Rhode Island ratified the Constitution with the seat apportioned by the Constitution.
March 4, 1791	67	▲2	1 Stat. 191	Vermont admitted.
June 1, 1792	69	▲2	1 Stat. 191	Kentucky admitted.
March 4, 1793	105	▲36	1 Stat. 253 (Apportionment Act of 1792)	Apportionment following the first census (1790). First to use the Jefferson method.
June 1, 1796	106	▲1	1 Stat. 491	Tennessee admitted.
March 1, 1803	107	▲1	2 Stat. 175	Ohio admitted.
March 4, 1803	142	▲35	2 Stat. 128	Apportionment following the second census (1800).
April 30, 1812	143	▲1	2 Stat. 703	Louisiana admitted.
March 4, 1813	182	▲39	2 Stat. 669	Apportionment following the third census (1810).
December 11, 1816	183	▲1	3 Stat. 290	Indiana admitted.
December 10, 1817	184	▲1	3 Stat. 349	Mississippi admitted.
December 3, 1818	185	▲1	3 Stat. 430	Illinois admitted.
December 14, 1819	186	▲1	3 Stat. 492	Alabama admitted.
March 15, 1820	186	Steady	3 Stat. 555	Maine admitted, 7 seats transferred from Massachusetts.
August 10, 1821	187	▲1	3 Stat. 547	Missouri admitted.
March 4, 1823	213	▲26	3 Stat. 651	Apportionment following the fourth census (1820).
March 4, 1833	240	▲27	4 Stat. 516	Apportionment following the fifth census (1830).
June 15, 1836	241	▲1	5 Stat. 51	Arkansas admitted.
January 26, 1837	242	▲1	5 Stat. 50	Michigan admitted.
March 4, 1843	223	▼19	5 Stat. 491	Apportionment following the sixth census (1840). First to use the Webster method. Became the only time the size of the House was reduced, except for the minor readjustments in 1863 and 1963.
March 3, 1845	224	▲1	5 Stat. 743	Florida admitted.
December 29, 1845	226	▲2	5 Stat. 798	Texas annexed and admitted.
December 28, 1846	228	▲2	5 Stat. 743; 9 Stat. 52	Iowa admitted.
May 29, 1848	230	▲2	9 Stat. 58; 9 Stat. 235	Wisconsin admitted.
March 4, 1849	231	▲1	9 Stat. 235	Additional seat apportioned to Wisconsin.
September 9, 1850	233	▲2	9 Stat. 452	California admitted.
March 4, 1853	233	Steady	9 Stat. 432	Apportionment following the seventh census (1850). First to use the Hamilton/Vinton (largest remainder) method.
March 4, 1853	234	▲1	10 Stat. 25	Additional seat apportioned to California (Note: The 1850 Apportionment bill provided a method to be used in future reapportionments, as well as establishing the then-current 233 as the number of seats to be apportioned after future censuses. Due to census returns being incomplete in California, an additional act provided that California retain the same representation it had when admitted, until a new census could be taken. California would otherwise have lost one seat, and so the total number of seats was increased by one to 234.)
May 11, 1858	236	▲2	11 Stat. 166	Minnesota admitted.
February 14, 1859	237	▲1	11 Stat. 383	Oregon admitted.
January 29, 1861	238	▲1	12 Stat. 126	Kansas admitted
June 2, 1862	239	▲1	12 Stat. 411	California apportioned an extra seat.
March 4, 1863	233	▼6	9 Stat. 432	Apportionment following the eighth census (1860), in accordance with the 1850 act, which provided for an apportionment of 233 seats.
March 4, 1863	241	▲8	12 Stat. 353	Supplemental apportionment of 8 seats (1 each for Pennsylvania, Ohio, Kentucky, Illinois, Iowa, Minnesota, Vermont, and Rhode Island), for an overall increase of 2 seats in the 38th Congress.
June 20, 1863	241	Steady	12 Stat. 633	West Virginia admitted, three seats transferred from Virginia.
October 31, 1864	242	▲1	13 Stat. 32	Nevada admitted
March 1, 1867	243	▲1	14 Stat. 391	Nebraska admitted
March 4, 1873	283	▲40	17 Stat. 28	Apportionment following the ninth census (1870), replacing the 1850 act
March 4, 1873	292	▲9	17 Stat. 192	Supplemental apportionment added one seat each for nine states
August 1, 1876	293	▲1	13 Stat. 34	Colorado admitted
March 4, 1883	325	▲32	22 Stat. 5	Apportionment following the tenth census (1880).
November 2, 1889	328	▲3	25 Stat. 679	North and South Dakota admitted, with one and two seats respectively.
November 8, 1889	329	▲1	25 Stat. 679	Montana admitted.
November 11, 1889	330	▲1	25 Stat. 679	Washington admitted.
July 3, 1890	331	▲1	26 Stat. 215	Idaho admitted.
July 10, 1890	332	▲1	26 Stat. 222	Wyoming admitted.
March 4, 1893	356	▲24	26 Stat. 735	Apportionment following the eleventh census (1890).
January 4, 1896	357	▲1	28 Stat. 109	Utah admitted.
March 4, 1903	386	▲29	31 Stat. 733	Apportionment following the twelfth census (1900)
November 16, 1907	391	▲5	34 Stat. 271	Oklahoma admitted
January 6, 1912	393	▲2	37 Stat. 39, incorporating 36 Stat. 557	New Mexico admitted
February 14, 1912	394	▲1	37 Stat. 39, incorporating 36 Stat. 557	Arizona admitted
March 4, 1913	435	▲41	37 Stat. 13 (Apportionment Act of 1911, §§1–2)	Apportionment following the thirteenth census (1910). Process returned to the Webster method.
March 4, 1933	435	Steady	46 Stat. 26 (Reapportionment Act of 1929)	Apportionment following the fifteenth census (1930). (Note: Congress failed to reapportion in 1923, following the fourteenth census (1920).) The size of the House became permanently capped at 435 seats under the Reapportionment Act of 1929.
January 3, 1943	435	Steady	46 Stat. 26 (Reapportionment Act of 1929); 54 Stat. 162	Apportionment following the sixteenth census (1940). First to use the Huntington–Hill method.
January 3, 1953	435	Steady	55 Stat. 761	Apportionment following the seventeenth census (1950) (Note: Pub. L. 77–291 amended section 22 of the Reapportionment Act of 1929 by wholly replacing its text.)
January 3, 1959	436	▲1	72 Stat. 345	Alaska admitted.
August 21, 1959	437	▲1	73 Stat. 8, §8	Hawaii admitted.
January 3, 1963	435	▼2	72 Stat. 345; 73 Stat. 8; 2 U.S.C. § 2a	Apportionment following the eighteenth census (1960) (Note: The Reapportionment Act of 1929 stated that the "then existing number of Representatives" would be apportioned after each census, which would have dictated an apportionment of 437 seats, but the Alaska Statehood Act and Hawaii Admission Act explicitly stated that the new seats were temporary increases. Both acts included the phrasing "That such temporary increase in the membership shall not operate to either increase or decrease the permanent membership of the House of Representatives as prescribed in the Act of August 8, 1911 (37 Stat. 13) nor shall such temporary increase affect the basis of apportionment established by the Act of November 15, 1941 (55 Stat. 761; 2 U.S.C. § 2a), for the Eighty-third Congress and each Congress thereafter.")
January 3, 1973	435	Steady	2 U.S.C. § 2a	Apportionment following the nineteenth census (1970).
January 3, 1983	435	Steady	2 U.S.C. § 2a	Apportionment following the twentieth census (1980).
January 3, 1993	435	Steady	2 U.S.C. § 2a	Apportionment following the twenty-first census (1990).
January 3, 2003	435	Steady	2 U.S.C. § 2a	Apportionment following the twenty-second census (2000).
January 3, 2013	435	Steady	2 U.S.C. § 2a	Apportionment following the twenty-third census (2010).
January 3, 2023	435	Steady	2 U.S.C. § 2a	Apportionment following the twenty-fourth census (2020).

== See also ==
- List of U.S. states by population
- List of U.S. states by historical population (tables of state populations since 1790)
- Electoral vote changes between United States presidential elections

== Notes ==
- Delegate counts in italics represent temporary counts assigned by Congress until the next decennial census or by the U.S. Constitution in 1789 until the first U.S. census.
- Elections held in the year of a census use the apportionment determined by the previous census.

Citations
