= Wyoming Rule =

Proposal to increase the size of the U.S. House of Representatives

The Wyoming Rule is a proposal to increase the size of the United States House of Representatives so that the standard representative-to-population ratio would be that of the state with the least population, which is currently Wyoming. Under Article One of the United States Constitution, each state is guaranteed at least one representative. If the disparity between the population of the most and least populous states continues to grow, the disproportionality of the U.S. House of Representatives will continue to increase unless the body, whose size has been fixed at 435 since 1929 (except for a brief period from 1959 to 1963), is expanded.

A total of 543 seats would have been required to implement the Wyoming Rule based on the 2010 United States census results. However, the decade leading up to the 2020 United States census saw Wyoming's population increase at a lower rate than that of the rest of the United States; as a result, the required House size to implement the Wyoming Rule will increase to 574. Under the Wyoming Rule, California would gain the most seats with seventeen more members than it will have after the next reapportionment.

== Legal and constitutional basis for the current House of Representatives size ==
The current size of the House was set by the Reapportionment Act of 1929. This law would need to be repealed and replaced in order to change the number of congressional members, which would require a majority of both houses of Congress to approve it. From a constitutional standpoint, the only restriction on House size is that there can be at most one representative per thirty thousand people, which limits the maximum size of Congress to roughly 11,000 representatives.

== Under the 2020 U.S. census ==
The chart set out below identifies the number of House seats that would be given to the respective states if the Wyoming Rule were to be implemented using the population numbers from the 2020 United States census.

South Dakota with its two seats and an average of 443,885 people per seat would have the most seats per capita. North Dakota with its lone seat (779,702 people per seat) would have the fewest seats per capita. This gives a ratio of 1 to 1.75654 between greatest and smallest number of persons per seat. By comparison, it will be 1 to 1.82574 for the lone seat of Delaware (990,837 per seat) and Montana's two seats (542,704 per seat).

Of the six states that currently have a single seat, Delaware and South Dakota would gain one seat. The other four—Wyoming, North Dakota, Alaska, and Vermont—would continue to have one seat.

State	Seats apportioned		Pop. per seat	Seat change	Percentage gain	Electoral votes (excluding D.C.)	Notes
State	Actual (2023)	Wyoming Rule	Pop. per seat	Seat change	Percentage gain	Electoral votes (excluding D.C.)	Notes
Alabama	7	9	558,895	+2	29%	11	
Alaska	1	1	736,081	0	0%	3	
Arizona	9	12	596,577	+3	33%	14	
Arkansas	4	5	602,751	+1	25%	7	
California	52	69	573,576	+17	33%	71	Largest gain in seats.
Colorado	8	10	578,217	+2	25%	12	
Connecticut	5	6	601,383	+1	20%	8	
Delaware	1	2	495,419	+1	100%	4	Tied for largest proportionate increase.
Florida	28	37	582,987	+9	32%	39	
Georgia	14	19	564,488	+5	36%	21	
Hawaii	2	3	486,712	+1	50%	5	
Idaho	2	3	613,792	+1	50%	5	
Illinois	17	22	582,852	+5	29%	24	
Indiana	9	12	565,857	+3	33%	14	
Iowa	4	6	532,068	+2	50%	8	
Kansas	4	5	588,173	+1	25%	7	
Kentucky	6	8	563,668	+2	33%	10	
Louisiana	6	8	582,684	+2	33%	10	
Maine	2	2	681,791	0	0%	4	
Maryland	8	11	562,298	+3	38%	13	
Massachusetts	9	12	586,122	+3	33%	14	
Michigan	13	18	560,247	+5	39%	20	
Minnesota	8	10	570,975	+2	25%	12	
Mississippi	4	5	592,783	+1	25%	7	
Missouri	8	11	560,026	+3	38%	13	
Montana	2	2	542,704	0	0%	4	
Nebraska	3	3	654,444	0	0%	5	Largest state to not gain an extra seat.
Nevada	4	5	621,692	+1	25%	7	
New Hampshire	2	2	689,545	0	0%	4	
New Jersey	12	16	580,906	+4	33%	18	
New Mexico	3	4	530,055	+1	33%	6	
New York	26	35	577,593	+9	35%	37	
North Carolina	14	18	580,775	+4	29%	20	
North Dakota	1	1	779,702	0	0%	3	Highest population per seat.
Ohio	15	20	590,442	+5	40%	22	
Oklahoma	5	7	566,217	+2	40%	9	
Oregon	6	7	605,929	+1	17%	9	
Pennsylvania	17	23	565,732	+6	35%	25	
Rhode Island	2	2	549,082	0	0%	4	
South Carolina	7	9	569,412	+2	29%	11	
South Dakota	1	2	443,885	+1	100%	4	Lowest population per seat. Smallest state to gain a seat. Tied for largest proportionate increase.
Tennessee	9	12	576,408	+3	33%	14	
Texas	38	51	572,221	+13	34%	53	
Utah	4	6	545,875	+2	50%	8	
Vermont	1	1	643,503	0	0%	3	
Virginia	11	15	576,970	+4	36%	17	
Washington	10	13	593,534	+3	30%	15	
West Virginia	2	3	598,348	+1	50%	5	
Wisconsin	8	10	589,747	+2	25%	12	
Wyoming	1	1	577,719	0	0%	3	
Total	435	574		+139	32%	674	677 total electoral votes including D.C.

== Historical House sizes ==
The following table describes how the House of Representatives would have looked historically, had the Wyoming Rule been adopted as part of the Reapportionment Act of 1929, instead of fixing the size at 435 representatives.

Census, Year	Size	AL	AK	AZ	AR	CA	CO	CT	DE	FL	GA	HI	ID	IL	IN	IA	KS	KY	LA	ME	MD	MA	MI	MN	MS	MO	MT	NE	NV	NH	NJ	NM	NY	NC	ND	OH	OK	OR	PA	RI	SC	SD	TN	TX	UT	VT	VA	WA	WV	WI	WY
15th, 1930	1,418	31	–	5	22	66	12	19	3	17	34	–	5	88	38	29	22	30	24	9	19	49	56	30	23	42	6	16	1	5	47	5	146	37	8	77	28	11	112	8	20	8	30	67	6	4	28	18	20	34	3
16th, 1940	1,191	26	–	5	18	63	10	16	2	17	28	–	5	72	31	23	16	26	21	8	17	39	48	25	20	34	5	12	1	5	38	5	122	32	6	63	21	10	90	7	17	6	27	58	5	3	24	16	17	29	2
17th, 1950	940	19	–	5	12	66	8	13	2	17	22	–	4	54	25	16	12	18	17	6	15	29	40	19	14	25	4	8	1	3	30	4	93	25	4	50	14	10	66	5	13	4	21	48	4	2	21	15	13	22	2
18th, 1960	793	14	1	6	8	70	8	11	2	22	17	3	3	45	21	12	10	13	14	4	14	23	35	15	10	19	3	6	1	3	27	4	74	20	3	43	10	8	50	4	11	3	16	42	4	2	18	13	8	18	2
19th, 1970	672	11	1	6	6	66	7	10	2	23	15	3	2	37	17	9	8	11	12	3	13	19	29	13	7	16	2	5	2	3	24	3	60	17	2	35	9	7	39	3	9	2	13	37	4	2	15	11	6	15	1
20th, 1980	567	10	1	7	6	59	7	8	2	24	14	2	2	29	14	7	6	9	11	3	11	14	23	10	6	12	2	4	2	2	18	3	44	15	2	27	8	7	30	2	8	2	12	36	4	1	13	10	5	12	1
21st, 1990	549	9	1	8	5	65	7	7	2	29	14	3	2	25	12	6	6	8	9	3	11	13	21	10	6	11	2	4	3	2	17	3	40	15	1	24	7	6	26	2	8	2	11	37	4	1	14	11	4	11	1
22nd, 2000	571	9	1	10	5	69	9	7	2	32	17	3	3	25	12	6	5	8	9	3	11	13	20	10	6	11	2	4	4	3	17	4	38	16	1	23	7	7	25	2	8	2	12	42	5	1	14	12	4	11	1
23rd, 2010	543	9	1	11	5	66	9	6	2	33	17	2	3	23	11	5	5	8	8	2	10	12	17	9	5	11	2	3	5	2	16	4	34	17	1	20	7	7	22	2	8	1	11	45	5	1	14	12	3	10	1
24th, 2020	574	9	1	12	5	69	10	6	2	37	19	3	3	22	12	6	5	8	8	2	11	12	18	10	5	11	2	3	5	2	16	4	35	18	1	20	7	7	23	2	9	2	12	51	6	1	15	13	3	10	1
Census, Year	Size	AL	AK	AZ	AR	CA	CO	CT	DE	FL	GA	HI	ID	IL	IN	IA	KS	KY	LA	ME	MD	MA	MI	MN	MS	MO	MT	NE	NV	NH	NJ	NM	NY	NC	ND	OH	OK	OR	PA	RI	SC	SD	TN	TX	UT	VT	VA	WA	WV	WI	WY

In the censuses since 1930, the smallest state was:

- Nevada (censuses 1930–1950)
- Alaska (censuses 1960–1980)
- Wyoming (censuses 1990–2020)

== Possible effects ==
While expanding the House would reduce the average disparity in district size, it would not necessarily reduce the disparity between the smallest and largest districts. After the 1990 United States census and with a House size of 435, the largest district (Montana) had 803,655 residents, 76.3% larger than the smallest district (Wyoming) with 455,975 residents. The Wyoming Rule would have given a House size of 549 in 1990 if the former method of seat apportionment had been used. With that size, the largest district (North Dakota) would have had 641,364 residents, 91.8% larger than the smallest districts (Delaware's two districts) at 334,348 residents each, due to Delaware having enough population to be split in two but North Dakota falling just on the other side of the threshold.

== See also ==
- Apportionment
- Congressional Apportionment Amendment
- List of proposed amendments to the United States Constitution
- List of U.S. states and territories by population
