= 1960 United States redistricting cycle =

The 1960 United States redistricting cycle took place following the completion of the 1960 United States census. In all fifty states, various bodies re-drew state legislative and congressional districts. States that are apportioned more than one seat in the United States House of Representatives also drew new districts for that legislative body. Following the 1960 United States elections, control of redistricting was split between Democrats and Republicans in 17 states. The resulting new districts were first implemented for the 1962 elections. It was the last redistricting cycle prior to the enactment of the Voting Rights Act of 1965 and the enactment of decisions by the Supreme Court which reformed redistricting practices prior to the 1970 census and redistricting cycle.

== U.S. House districts ==
Eliminated districts	Created districts
Alabama's 1st congressional district; Alabama's 2nd congressional district; Alabama's 3rd congressional district; Alabama's 4th congressional district; Alabama's 5th congressional district; Alabama's 6th congressional district; Alabama's 7th congressional district; Alabama's 8th congressional district; Alabama's 9th congressional district; Illinois's 25th congressional district; Kansas' 6th congressional district; Kentucky's 8th congressional district; Maine's 3rd congressional district; Massachusetts's 13th congressional district; Massachusetts's 14th congressional district; Missouri's 11th congressional district; New York's 42nd congressional district; New York's 43rd congressional district; Pennsylvania's 28th congressional district; Pennsylvania's 29th congressional district	Alabama's at-large congressional district; Arizona's 3rd congressional district; California's 31st congressional district; California's 32nd congressional district; California's 33rd congressional district; California's 34th congressional district; California's 35th congressional district; California's 36th congressional district; California's 37th congressional district; California's 38th congressional district; Maryland's at-large congressional district; Michigan's at-large congressional district; New Jersey's 15th congressional district; Ohio's at-large congressional district; Texas's at-large congressional seat

== See also ==
- Redistricting in the United States
