= Reapportionment Act of 1929 =

United States Law providing for 435 Representatives in the House

- Long title: An Act To provide for the fifteenth and subsequent decennial censuses and to provide for apportionment of Representatives in Congress.
- Enacted by: the 71st United States Congress
- Effective: June 18, 1929

Citations
- Public law: Pub. L. 71–13
- Statutes at Large: 46 Stat. 21

Codification
- Titles amended: Title 2—The Congress
- U.S.C. sections created: 2 U.S.C. § 2a

Legislative history
- Introduced in the Senate as S. 312 by Arthur Vandenberg (R-MI); Passed the Senate on May 29, 1929 (57-26); Passed the House on June 6, 1929 (272-104); Signed into law by President Herbert Hoover on June 18, 1929

The Reapportionment Act of 1929 (ch. 28, 46 Stat. 21, 2 U.S.C. § 2a), also known as the Permanent Apportionment Act of 1929, is a combined census and apportionment bill enacted on June 18, 1929, that establishes a permanent method for apportioning a constant 435 seats in the U.S. House of Representatives according to each census. This reapportionment was preceded by the Apportionment Act of 1911, which established the 435-seat size, and followed nearly a decade of debate and gridlock after the 1920 Census. The 1929 Act took effect after the 1932 election, meaning that the House was never reapportioned as a result of the 1920 United States census, and representation in the lower chamber remained frozen for twenty years.

Unlike earlier Apportionment Acts, the 1929 Act neither repealed nor restated the requirements of the previous apportionment acts that congressional districts be contiguous, compact, and equally populated. It was not clear whether these requirements were still in effect until 1932, when the Supreme Court of the United States ruled in Wood v. Broom (1932) that the provisions of each apportionment act affected only the apportionment for which they were written. Thus the size and population requirements, last stated in the Apportionment Act of 1911, were found to be inapplicable to the 1929 Act. The 1929 Act gave little direction concerning congressional redistricting. It merely established a system in which House seats would be reallocated to states which have shifts in population. The lack of recommendations concerning districts had several significant effects. The Reapportionment Act of 1929 allowed states to draw districts of varying size and shape. It also allowed states to abandon districts altogether and elect at least some representatives at-large, which several states chose to do, including New York, Illinois, Washington, Hawaii, and New Mexico. For example, in the 88th Congress (in the early 1960s) 22 of the 435 representatives were elected at-large. This would continue until Congress passed the Uniform Congressional District Act which reinforced the single-member district requirement.

== Historical context ==
Article One, Section 2, Clause 3 of the United States Constitution requires that seats in the United States House of Representatives be apportioned among the various states according to the population disclosed by the most recent decennial census, but only counting "free persons" and "three-fifths of all other persons", including slaves. The first federal law governing the size of the House and the method of allotting representatives, the Apportionment Act of 1792, was signed into law by George Washington in April 1792. It set the number of members of the House at 105 (effective March 4, 1793, with the 3rd Congress). Following the American Civil War the Fourteenth Amendment eliminated the three-fifths clause by stating that "Representatives shall be apportioned among the several states according to their respective numbers, counting the whole number of persons in each state, excluding Indians not taxed."

With but one exception, the Apportionment Act of 1842, Congress enlarged the House of Representatives by various degrees following each subsequent census including 1913, by which time the adjusted membership had grown to 435. From the 1790s through the early 19th century, the seats were apportioned among the states using Jefferson's method. In 1842, the House was reduced from 242 to 223 members by the incoming Whig Party, which had ousted the Jacksonian Democrats. The Act of 1842 also contained wording which required single-member district elections rather than at-large elections within a state, prompting backlash against an increase in Congressional power.

In 1842 the debate on apportionment in the House began in the customary way with a jockeying for the choice of a divisor using Jefferson's method. On one day alone, 59 different motions to fix a divisor were made in a House containing but 242 members. The values ranged from 30,000 to 140,000 with more than half between 50,159 and 62,172. But the Senate had tired of this approach and proposed instead an apportionment of 223 members using Webster's method. In the House John Quincy Adams urged acceptance of the method but argued vehemently for enlarging the number of members, as New England's portion was steadily dwindling.

From 1842 through the 1860s, the House increased minimally at each census and as new states were admitted to the union. But the Fourteenth Amendment dramatically increased the apportionment population of the Southern states because the black population counted fully instead of being reduced to three-fifths its numbers. As a result, a major increase in seats was needed to keep about the same number of seats in the northern states and the House was enlarged by 50 seats (21%) in respect of the 1870 census. The reapportionment of 1872 created a house size of 292. No particular apportionment method was used during the period 1850 to 1890, but from 1890 through 1910, the increasing membership of the House was calculated in such a way as to ensure that no state lost a seat due to shifts in apportionment population. In 1881, a provision for equally populated contiguous and compact single member districts was added to the reapportionment law, and this was echoed in all decennial reapportionment acts through to 1911.

In 1918, after six years of Democratic control of Congress and the presidency, the Republicans gained control of both houses of Congress, and two years later also won the presidency. Due to increased immigration and a large rural-to-urban shift in population from 1910 to 1920, the new Republican Congress refused to reapportion the House of Representatives because such a reapportionment would have shifted political power away from the Republicans. A reapportionment in 1921 in the traditional fashion would have increased the size of the House to 483 seats, but many members would have lost their seats due to the population shifts, and the House chamber did not have adequate seats for 483 members. By 1929, no reapportionment had been made since 1911, and there was vast representational inequity, measured by the average district size; by 1929 some states had districts twice as large as others due to population growth and demographic shift.

As an example, the city of Detroit doubled in population between the 1910 and 1920 censuses. Since the House was not reapportioned, the city had just two congressmen representing 497,000 people each. The average congressional district in 1920 had only 212,000. By the end of the decade things had grown worse. One Detroit congressman represented 1.3 million people while some rural districts in Missouri had fewer than 180,000 people.

== Impact ==
The Reapportionment Act of 1929 capped the number of representatives at 435 (the size previously established by the Apportionment Act of 1911), where it has remained except for a temporary increase to 437 members upon the 1959 admission of Alaska and Hawaii into the Union.

As a result, the average size of a congressional district has more than tripled in size – from 210,328 inhabitants based on the 1910 Census to 761,169 according to the 2020 Census. Additionally, due to the unchanging size of the House, combined with the requirement that districts not cross state lines, and the population distribution among states in the 2020 Census, there is a wide size disparity among congressional districts: Delaware, the 45th-most populous state, has the largest average district size, with 989,948 people; and Montana, the 44th-most populous state, has the smallest, with 542,113 people. Since 1941, seats in the House have been apportioned among the states according to the method of equal proportions. Implementation of this method has eliminated debates about the proper divisor for district size; any divisor that gives 435 members has the same apportionment. It created other problems however, because, given the fixed-size House, each state's congressional delegation changes as a result of population shifts, with various states either gaining or losing seats based on census results. Each state is then responsible for designing the shape of its districts.

=== Redistricting ===
The Act also did away with any mention of districts at all. This allowed political parties in control of a state legislature to draw district boundaries at will and to elect some or all representatives at large. This would be the case until Congress enacted the Uniform Congressional District Act.

== See also ==
- Redistricting
- Reform Act 1832
- Rotten and pocket boroughs
- United States congressional apportionment
