= Apportionment Act of 1792 =

First American apportionment law

- Long title: An Act for apportioning Representatives among the several States, according in the first enumeration.
- Enacted by: the 2nd United States Congress
- Effective: March 4, 1793

Citations
- Statutes at Large: 1 Stat. 253

Legislative history
- Passed the House on February 21, 1792 (34–16); Passed the Senate on March 12, 1792 (14–13) with amendment; House agreed to Senate amendment on March 23, 1792 (31–29); Vetoed by President George Washington on April 5, 1792; Passed the House on April 10, 1792; Passed the Senate on April 10, 1792; Signed by President George Washington on April 14, 1792

The Apportionment Act of 1792 (1 Stat. 253) was the first Apportionment Act, passed by the United States Congress on April 10, and signed into law by President George Washington on April 14, 1792. The Act set the number of members of the House of Representatives at 105, effective with the 3rd Congress, to begin March 4, 1793, and allotted representatives to each state based on the population according to the 1790 Census. The apportionment was on the basis of "the ratio of one for every thirty-three thousand persons in the respective States", and used the Jefferson method,which continued to be used until the 1830 census. After discarding the remainders, the average population of congressional districts was 34,436 persons.

An earlier apportionment bill had been approved by the House in February 1792 and the Senate in March 1792, but was vetoed by the President on April 5, 1792. It was the first presidential veto of legislation in American history (and the history of modern democracies).

== Background ==
The United States Constitution provided the first apportionment of seats in the House of Representatives and stipulated that a Census (“enumeration”) of the population of the states must be made within three years of the first meeting of Congress. That first Census took place in 1790. Article I, Section 2, Clause 3 of the Constitution stipulates that the apportionment of seats is to be effected on the basis of population, and that each state is entitled to at least one representative.

== Text ==
An Act apportioning Representatives among the several States, according to the first enumeration.

Be it enacted by the Senate and House of Representatives of the United States of America in Congress assembled, That from and after the third day of March one thousand seven hundred and ninety-three, the House of Representatives shall be composed of members elected agreeably to a ratio of one member for every thirty-three thousand persons in each state, computed according to the rule prescribed by the constitution; that is to say:
Within the state of New Hampshire, four;
within the state of Massachusetts, fourteen;
within the state of Vermont, two;
within the state of Rhode Island, two;
within the state of Connecticut, seven;
within the state of New York, ten;
within the state of New Jersey, five;
within the state of Pennsylvania, thirteen;
within the state of Delaware, one;
within the state of Maryland, eight;
within the state of Virginia, nineteen;
within the state of Kentucky, two;
within the state of North Carolina, ten;
within the state of South Carolina, six;
and within the state of Georgia, two members.

APPROVED, April 14, 1792.

== Original bill ==
=== Legislative history ===
An earlier apportionment bill was vetoed by President George Washington on April 5, 1792, as unconstitutional, marking the first use of the U.S. president's veto power. Washington made two objections in a letter to the House describing the reason for his veto. The first objection made in the letter was that the bill did not have a uniform ratio to reach the numbers of representatives to population set forth in the bill. Secondly, the bill "allotted to eight of the States more than one for every thirty thousand" as delimited by Article I Section II of the United States Constitution. The next day, the House attempted to override the President's veto but failed to reach the two thirds vote required and on April 10 efforts began to revise the bill a third time.

=== Review ===
On March 26, the bill was presented to the President. There was great disagreement among Washington's advisors, and therefore he called upon Edmund Randolph, Thomas Jefferson, Alexander Hamilton, and Henry Knox to give him their opinions of the bill. Randolph and Jefferson both said, as the bill established the total number of representatives, 120, by dividing the aggregate of the federal census by 30,000, it was unconstitutional. The Constitution required, they argued, the choice of a common divisor and the division of the population residing in each state by that number to establish the size of the United States House of Representatives. Also, the fact that the allocating method invented by Hamilton, which the bill was using, gave an additional member to the eight states with the largest fraction left over after dividing by 30,000 was called "repugnant to the spirit of the constitution" by Randolph. Jefferson urged that Washington veto it because it was unconstitutional and introduced principles that were liable to be abused in the future.

Contrary to Jefferson and Randolph, both Knox and Hamilton urged that he approve the bill. Knox argued on April 3 that the Constitution was unclear about "whether the numbers of representatives shall be apportioned on the aggregate number of all the people of the United States, or on the aggregate numbers of the people of each state." As the constitutionality of the bill was, Knox said, "only doubted not proved but the equity of the measure apparent, it would appear rather a delicate measure for the President to decide the question contrary to the bill as passed." Hamilton wrote Washington on the following day that, while he had not yet read the bill, it seemed to him that the bill "performs every requisition of the constitution; and it will not be denied that it performs this in the manner most consistent with equality." Like Knox, Hamilton believed that "In cases where two constructions may reasonably be adopted, and neither can be pronounced inconsistent with the public good, it seems proper that the legislative sense should prevail" and the bill should be signed into law.

=== Veto ===
After considering both sides of the argument, Washington decided that Jefferson and Randolph were correct, and Washington agreed that the bill was unconstitutional. Even so, Washington feared that by vetoing it he would increase geographical tensions by siding with the south, as Jefferson and Randolph were both from Virginia. Further discussion with Randolph, Jefferson, and James Madison, however, allayed Washington's concerns, and on April 5, the president decided to return the bill to the House of Representatives with the two objections that "there is no one proportion or divisor which, applied to the respective numbers of the States will yield the number and allotment of representatives proposed by the Bill" and that "the Bill has allotted to eight of the States, more than one [representative] for thirty thousand."

== Second bill ==
After receiving Washington's veto message, Congress decided on April 10, 1792, to apportion representatives at "the ratio of one for every thirty-three thousand persons in the respective States". Washington signed the revised bill into law on April 14, 1792.

== See also ==
- United States congressional apportionment
- Redistricting in the United States
