= Title 2 of the United States Code =

U.S. federal statutes on the role of Congress

Title 2 of the United States Code outlines the role of Congress in the United States Code.

== Chapter 1 ==
Chapter 1 — Election of Senators and Representatives

- § 1 — Time for election of Senators
- § 1a — Election to be certified by governor
- § 1b — Countersignature of certificate of election
- § 2a — Reapportionment of Representatives; time and manner; existing decennial census figures as basis; statement by President; duty of clerk
- § 2b — Number of Representatives from each State in 78th and subsequent Congresses
- § 2c — Number of Congressional Districts; number of Representatives from each District
- § 5 — Nominations for Representatives at large
- § 6 — Reduction of representation
- § 7 — Time of election
- § 8 — Vacancies
- § 9 — Voting for Representatives

Omitted sections: 2, 3, & 4.

== Chapter 2 ==
Chapter 2 — Organization of Congress

- § 21 — Oath of Senators
- § 22 — Oath of President of Senate
- § 23 — Presiding officer of Senate may administer oaths
- § 24 — Secretary of Senate or assistant secretary may administer oaths
- § 25 — Oath of Speaker, Members, and Delegates
- § 25a — Delegate to House of Representatives from District of Columbia
- § 26 — Roll of Representatives-elect
- § 27 — Change of place of meeting
- § 28 — Parliamentary precedents of House of Representatives
- § 28a — Compilation of the Precedents of House of Representatives; date of completion; biennial update; printing and availability of copies
- § 28b — Printing and binding as public document of Precedents of House of Representatives; number of sets authorized
- § 28c — Distribution of Precedents by Public Printer
- § 28d — Distribution of Precedents by Public Printer for official use; particular distribution; marking and ownership of sets
- § 28e — Distribution of Precedents by Joint Committee on Printing of surplus sets; additional printing, etc., of sets under authority of Joint Committee
- § 29 — Condensed and simplified versions of House precedents; other useful materials in summary form; form and distribution to Members of Congress, Resident Commissioner from Puerto Rico, and others; appointment and compensation of personnel; utilization of services of personnel of Federal agencies
- § 29a — Early organization of House of Representatives
- § 29d — Committee on Standards of Official Conduct of House of Representatives
- § 30 — Term of service of Members of Congress as trustees or directors of corporations or institutions appropriated for
- § 30a — Jury duty exemption of elected officials of legislative branch

Repealed section: 25b.
Omitted sections: 29b, & 29c.

== Chapter 3 ==
Chapter 3 — Compensation and Allowances of Members

- § 31 — Compensation of Members of Congress
- § 31-2 — Gifts and travel
- § 31a-1 — Expense allowance of Majority and Minority Leaders of Senate; expense allowance of Majority and Minority Whips; methods of payment; taxability
- § 31a-2 — Representation Allowance Account for Majority and Minority Leaders of Senate
- § 31a-2a — Transfer of funds from representation allowance of Majority and Minority Leaders of Senate to expense allowance; availability; definitions
- § 31a-2b — Transfer of funds from appropriations account of Majority and Minority Leaders of Senate to appropriations account, Miscellaneous Items, within Senate contingent fund
- § 31a-2c — Transfer of funds from appropriations account of Majority and Minority Whips of Senate to appropriations account, Miscellaneous Items, within Senate contingent fund
- § 31a-2d — Transfer of funds from appropriations account of the Office of the Vice President and the Offices of the Secretaries for the Majority and Minority to the Senate contingent fund
- § 31a-3 — Expense allowance for Chairmen of Majority and Minority Conference Committees of Senate; method of payment; taxability
- § 31a-4 — Expense allowance for Chairmen of Majority and Minority Policy Committees of Senate; method of payment; taxability
- § 31b — Expense allowance of Speaker of House of Representatives
- § 31b-1 — Former Speakers of House of Representatives; retention of office, furniture, etc., in Congressional district following expiration of term as Representative; exceptions
- § 31b-2 — Allowance available to former Speaker for payment of office and other expenses for administration, etc., of matters pertaining to incumbency in office as Representative and Speaker
- § 31b-4 — Franked mail and printing privileges of former Speaker
- § 31b-5 — Staff assistance to former Speaker for administration, etc., of matters pertaining to incumbency in office as Representative and Speaker; compensation and status of staff
- § 31b-7 — Availability of entitlements of former Speaker for 5 years
- § 32 — Compensation of President pro tempore of Senate
- § 32a — Compensation of Deputy President pro tempore of Senate
- § 32b — Expense allowance of President pro tempore of Senate; methods of payment; taxability
- § 33 — Senators' salaries
- § 34 — Representatives' and Delegates' salaries payable monthly
- § 35 — Salaries payable monthly after taking oath
- § 35a — End-of-the-month salary payment schedule inapplicable to Senators
- § 36 — Salaries of Senators
- § 36a — Payment of sums due deceased Senators and Senate personnel
- § 37 — Salaries of Representatives, Delegates, and Resident Commissioners elected for unexpired terms
- § 38a — Disposition of unpaid salary and other sums on death of Representative or Resident Commissioner
- § 38b — Death gratuity payments as gifts
- § 39 — Deductions for absence
- § 40 — Deductions for withdrawal
- § 40a — Deductions for delinquent indebtedness
- § 42a — Special delivery postage allowance for President of Senate
- § 43b-2 — Staff expenses for House Members attending organizational caucus or conference
- § 43b-3 — Payments and reimbursements for certain House staff expenses
- § 43d — Organizational expenses of Senator-elect
- § 46a — Stationery allowance for President of Senate
- § 46a-1 — Senate revolving fund for stationery allowances; availability of unexpended balances; withdrawals
- § 46b-1 — House revolving fund for stationery allowances; disposition of moneys from stationery sales; availability of unexpended balances
- § 46d-1 — Long-distance telephone calls for Vice President
- § 47 — Mode of payment
- § 48 — Certification of salary and mileage accounts
- § 49 — Certificate of salary during recess
- § 50 — Substitute to sign certificates for salary and accounts
- § 51 — Monuments to deceased Senators or House Members
- § 54 — Annotated United States Code for Members of House of Representatives to be paid for from Members' Representational Allowance
- § 55 — United States Code Annotated or United States Code Service; procurement for Senators
- § 57 — Adjustment of House of Representatives allowances by Committee on House Oversight
- § 57a — Limitation on allowance authority of Committee on House Oversight
- § 57b — Representational allowance for Members of House of Representatives
- § 58 — Mail, telegraph, telephone, stationery, office supplies, and home State office and travel expenses for Senators
- § 58a — Telecommunications services for Senators; payment of costs out of contingent fund
- § 58a-1 — Payment for telecommunications equipment and services; definitions
- § 58a-2 — Certification of telecommunications equipment and services as official
- § 58a-3 — Report on telecommunications to Committee on Rules and Administration
- § 58a-4 — Metered charges on copiers; "Sergeant at Arms" and "user" defined; certification of services and equipment as official; deposit of payments; availability for expenditure
- § 58c — Senators' Official Personnel and Office Expense Account
- § 59 — Home State office space for Senators; lease of office space
- § 59-1 — Additional home State office space for Senators; declaration of disaster or emergency
- § 59b — Purchase of office equipment or furnishings by Senators
- § 59c — Transferred
- § 59d — Transportation of official records and papers to House Member's district
- § 59d-1 — Transportation of official records and papers to a Senator's State
- § 59e — Official mail of persons entitled to use congressional frank
- § 59f — Mass mailings by Senate offices; quarterly statements; publication of summary tabulations
- § 59g — Mass mailing of information by Senators under frank; quarterly registration with Secretary of Senate
- § 59h — Mass mailing sent by House Members

Omitted sections: 42a-1, 42b 43, 43a, 44, 45, 46, 46a-2, 46a-4.
Repealed sections: 31-1, 31a, 31b-3, 31b-6, 31c, 38, 41, 42, 42c, 42d, 43b, 43b-1, 43c, 46a-3, 46b, 46b-2, 46c, 46d, 64d-2, 46d-3, 46d-4, 46d-5, 46e, 46f, 46f-1, 46g, 46g-1, 46h, 46i, 52, 53, 56, 58b, 58c-1, & 59a.

== Chapter 4 ==
Chapter 4—Officers and Employees of Senate and House of Representatives

== Chapter 5 ==
Chapter 5--Library of Congress

== Chapter 6 ==
Chapter 6—Congressional And Committee Procedure; Investigations; Legislative Reorganization Act of 1946

== Chapter 7 ==
Chapter 7--Contested Elections

== Chapter 8 ==
Chapter 8--Federal Corrupt Practices

== Chapter 8a ==
Chapter 8a—Regulation of Lobbying

== Chapter 9 ==
Chapter 9--Office of Legislative Counsel

== Chapter 9a ==
Chapter 9a--Office of Law Revision Counsel

== Chapter 9b ==
Chapter 9b--Legislative Classification Office

== Chapter 9c ==
Chapter 9c--Office of Parliamentarian of House of Representatives

== Chapter 9d ==
Chapter 9d--Office of Senate Legal Counsel

== Chapter 10 ==
Chapter 10—Classification of Employees of House of Representatives

== Chapter 10a ==
Chapter 10a—Payroll Administration in House of Representatives

== Chapter 11 ==
Chapter 11--Citizens' Commission on Public Service and Compensation

== Chapter 12 ==
Chapter 12—Contested Elections

== Chapter 13 ==
Chapter 13--Joint Committee on Congressional Operations

== Chapter 14 ==
Chapter 14--Federal Election Campaigns

== Chapter 15 ==
Chapter 15--Office of Technology Assessment

== Chapter 16 ==
Chapter 16—Congressional Mailing Standards

== Chapter 17 ==
Chapter 17--Congressional Budget Office

== Chapter 17A ==
Chapter 17A—Congressional Budget And Fiscal Operations

== Chapter 17b ==
Chapter 17b--Impoundment Control And Line Item Veto

== Chapter 18 ==
Chapter 18—Legislative Personnel Financial Disclosure Requirements

== Chapter 19 ==
Chapter 19--Congressional Award Program

== Chapter 19a ==
Chapter 19a--John Heinz Competitive Excellence Award

== Chapter 20 ==
Chapter 20--Emergency Powers to Eliminate Budget Deficits, including laws originally passed in Gramm–Rudman–Hollings Balanced Budget Act and amended in following acts such as the Balanced Budget Act of 1997 and Budget Control Act of 2011

== Chapter 21 ==
Chapter 21—Civic Achievement Award Program in Honor of Office of Speaker of House of Representatives

== Chapter 22 ==
Chapter 22--John C. Stennis Center for Public Service Training and Development

== Chapter 22a ==
Chapter 22a--Open World Leadership Center

== Chapter 23 ==
Chapter 23—Government Employee Rights

== Chapter 24 ==
Chapter 24—Congressional Accountability

== Chapter 25 ==
Chapter 25--Unfunded Mandates Reform

== Chapter 26 ==
Chapter 26--Disclosure of Lobbying Activities

== Chapter 27 ==
Chapter 27—Sound Recording Preservation by the Library of Congress
