= Loosemore–Hanby index =

Measurement of difference between votes received and seats won

The Loosemore–Hanby index measures disproportionality of electoral systems, how much the principle of one person, one vote is violated. It computes the absolute difference between votes cast and seats obtained using the formula:

$LH=\frac{1}{2}\sum_{i=1}^n|v_i-s_i|$,
where $v_i$ is the vote share and $s_i$ the seat share of party $i$ such that $\Sigma_i v_i = \Sigma_i s_i = 1$, and $n$ is the overall number of parties.

This index is minimized by the largest remainder (LR) method with the Hare quota. Any apportionment method that minimizes it will always apportion identically to LR-Hare. Other methods, including the widely used divisor methods such as the Webster/Sainte-Laguë method or the D'Hondt method minimize the Sainte-Laguë index instead.

The index is named after John Loosemore and Victor J. Hanby, who first published the formula in 1971 in a paper entitled "The Theoretical Limits of Maximum Distortion: Some Analytic Expressions for Electoral Systems". Along with Douglas W. Rae's, the formula is one of the two most cited disproportionality indices. Whereas the Rae index measures the average deviation, the Loosemore–Hanby index measures the total deviation. Michael Gallagher used least squares to develop the Gallagher index, which takes a middle ground between the Rae and Loosemore–Hanby indices.

The LH index is related to the Schutz index of inequality, which is defined as
$$S = \frac{1}{2} \sum_{i=1}^{n} |e_i - a_i|,$$
where $e_i$ is the expected share of individual $i$ and $a_i$ her allocated share. Under the LH index, parties take the place of individuals, vote shares replace expectation shares, and seat shares allocation shares. The LH index is also related to the dissimilarity index of segregation. All three indexes are special cases of the more general $\Delta$ index of dissimilarity. The LH index is related to the amount of wasted vote, which only measures the difference between votes cast and seats obtained for parties which did not obtain any seats.

The complement of the LH index is called Party Total Representativity, also called Rose index R. The Rose index is typically expressed in % and can be calculated by subtracting the LH index from 1:

$R=1-LH=1-\frac{1}{2}\sum_{i=1}^n|v_i-s_i|$.

== Example of calculating distortion ==
=== Netherlands ===
This table uses the 2021 Dutch general election result. The Netherlands uses a nationwide party list system, with seats allocated by the D'Hondt method. The low figure achieved through this calculation suggests the election was very proportional.

Party	Vote Share (%)	Seat Share (%)	Absolute Difference (%)
VVD	21.87	22.67	0.80
D66	15.02	16.00	0.98
PVV	10.79	11.33	0.54
CDA	9.50	10.00	0.50
SP	5.98	6.00	0.02
PvdA	5.73	6.00	0.27
GL	5.16	5.33	0.17
FvD	5.02	5.33	0.31
PvdD	3.84	4.00	0.16
CU	3.37	3.33	0.04
Volt	2.42	2.00	0.42
JA21	2.37	2.00	0.37
SGP	2.07	2.00	0.07
DENK	2.03	2.00	0.03
50+	1.02	0.67	0.35
BBB	1.00	0.67	0.33
BIJ1	0.84	0.67	0.17
Others	1.97	0.00	1.97
Total of absolute differences			4.58 %
Total / 2			2.29 %

== Application ==
=== Europe ===
The following table displays a calculation of the Rose Index by Nohlen of the most, or second most, recent legislative election in each European country prior to 2009. This calculation ranges from 0-100, with 100 being the most proportional score possible, and 0 the least. Parties which received less than 0.5% of the vote were not included.

Country	Rose Index
Albania	46.6 (Note: Calculated using aggregated plurality results)
Andorra	89.1 (Note: Calculated only using the proportional part of the system)
Austria	95.6
Belarus	N/A
Belgium	90.5
Bosnia and Herzegovina	82.0
Bulgaria	93.4
Croatia	87.2
Cyprus	96.1
Czechia	91.1
Denmark	99.0
Estonia	94.0
Finland	94.6
France	77.4
Germany	94.2
Great Britain	80.0
Greece	90.9
Hungary	N/A
Iceland	96.7
Ireland	90.3
Italy	95.1
Latvia	89.7
Liechtenstein	98.3
Lithuania	91.5
Luxembourg	95.5
Macedonia	N/A
Malta	98.0
Moldova	83.6
Monaco	68.8
Montenegro	N/A
Netherlands	96.7
Norway	96.1
Poland	53.3
Portugal	91.5
Romania	N/A
Russia	70.0
San Marino	98.5
Serbia	90.8
Slovakia	89.1
Slovenia	90.1
Spain	93.2
Sweden	95.7
Switzerland	96.2
Ukraine	81.6

== Software implementation ==
- Loosemore-Hanby Index in PolRep, an R package.

== See also ==
- Efficiency gap
