= Seats-to-votes ratio =

Measure of equal representation

The seats-to-votes ratio, also known as the advantage ratio, is a measure of equal representation of voters. The equation for seats-to-votes ratio for a political party i is:

$$\mathrm{a_i} = s_i/v_i$$,

where $\mathrm{v_i}$ is fraction of votes cast for that party and $s_i$ is fraction of seats won by that party.

In the case both seats and votes are represented as fractions or percentages, then every voter has equal representation if the seats-to-votes ratio is 1. The principle of equal representation is expressed in slogan one man, one vote and relates to proportional representation. The seats-to-votes ratio is used as the basis for the Gallagher index method of analyzing proportionality or disproportionality.

Related is the votes-per-seat-won, which is inverse to the seats-to-votes ratio.

== Relation to disproportionality indices ==
The Sainte-Laguë Index is a disproportionality index derived by applying the Pearson's chi-squared test to the seats-to-votes ratio, the Gallagher index has a similar formula.

== Seats-to-votes ratio for seat allocation to parties ==
Different apportionment methods such as Sainte-Laguë method and D'Hondt method differ in the seats-to-votes ratio for individual parties.

=== Seats-to-votes ratio for Sainte-Laguë method ===
The Sainte-Laguë method optimizes the seats-to-votes ratio among all parties $i$ with the least squares approach.

Disproportionality, the difference of the parties' seats-to-votes ratio and the ideal seats-to-votes ratio for each party, is squared, weighted according to the vote share of each party and summed up:

$$error = \sum_i {v_i*\left(\frac{s_i}{v_i}-1\right)^2}$$

It was shown that this error is minimized by the Sainte-Laguë method.

=== Seats-to-votes ratio for D'Hondt method ===
The D'Hondt method approximates proportionality by minimizing the largest seats-to-votes ratio among all parties. The largest seats-to-votes ratio, which measures how over-represented the most over-represented party among all parties is:

$$\delta = \max_i a_i,$$

The D'Hondt method minimizes the largest seats-to-votes ratio by assigning the seats,

$$\delta^* = \min_{\mathbf{s} \in \mathcal{S}} \max_i a_i,$$

where $\mathbf{s}$ is a seat allocation from the set of all allowed seat allocations $\mathcal{S}$.
