= Proportional representation =

Voting system that makes outcomes proportional to vote totals

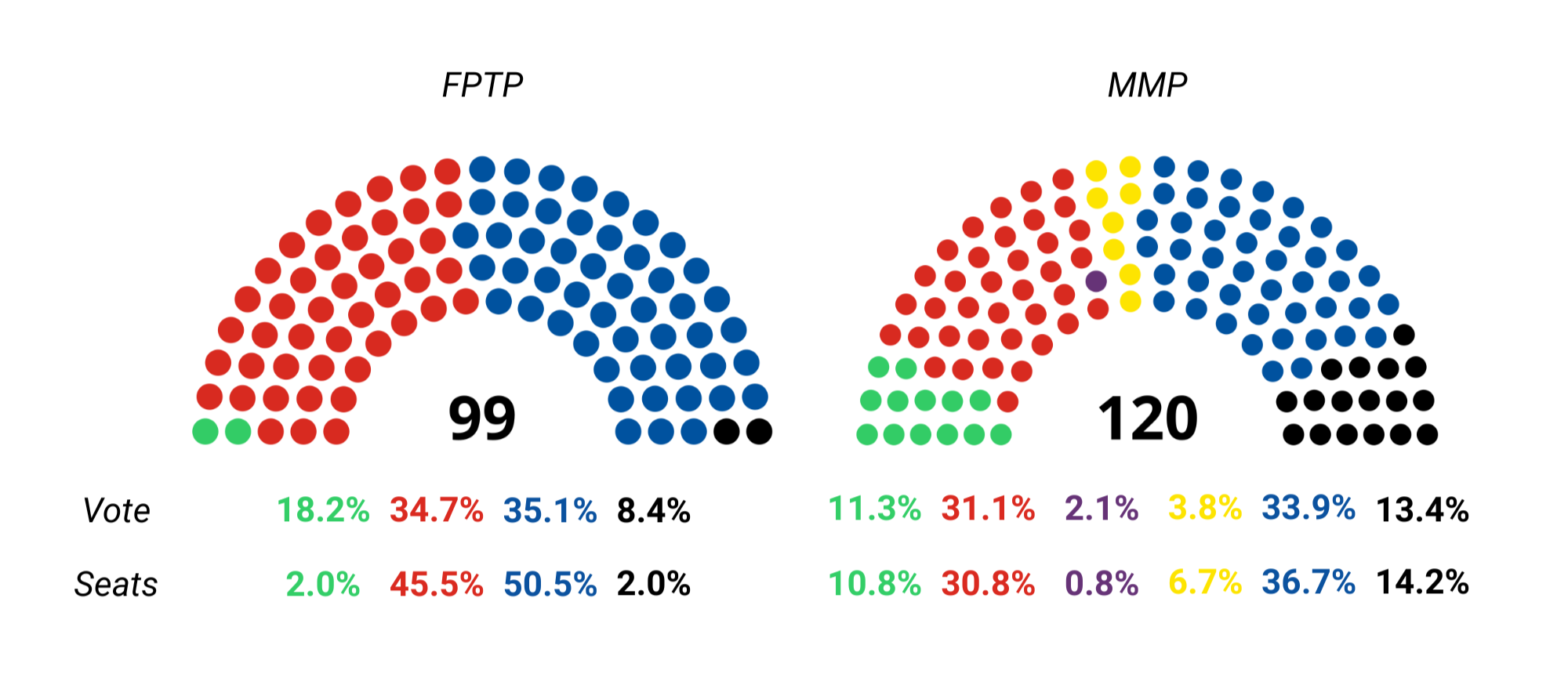
On the left are the results of the last first-past-the-post election in New Zealand before the implementation of mixed-member proportional representation in 1996. PR systems aim to align vote percentage with seat distribution. The 1996 seat results (right) matched the popular vote more closely than the 1993 election.

Proportional representation (PR) is achieved by any electoral system under which subgroups of an electorate are reflected proportionately in the elected body. The party make-up of the elected representatives reflects the party make-up of the votes cast. The concept applies to representation of political parties and also other divisions of voters.

The term is used for any of the various electoral systems that produce proportional representation. The aim of such systems is that all votes cast, or at least a large proportion, are used to elect someone and that each representative in an assembly is elected by a roughly equal number of votes, and thus all (or most) votes have equal weight. Under other election systems, a slight majority in a district – or even just a minority of votes when it forms a plurality – is all that is needed to elect a member or group of members. PR systems provide balanced representation to different factions, usually defined by parties, reflecting how votes were cast.

In closed list PR systems where only a choice of parties is allowed, the seats are allocated to parties in proportion to the vote tally or vote share each party receives. Under open list PR systems and candidate-based PR systems (such as the single transferable vote), the winning candidates are elected both on personal appeal and party label.

Exact proportionality is never achieved under PR systems, except by chance. The use of electoral thresholds that are intended to limit the representation of small, often extreme parties reduces proportionality in list systems, and any insufficiency in the number of levelling seats reduces proportionality in mixed-member proportional (MMP) or additional-member systems. Under single-transferable-vote (STV) or party-list PR systems, districts with a small or moderate number of seats allow local representation but may reduce proportionality. Any use of districts dividing the electorate creates a possibility of somewhat disproportionate results. Other sources of disproportionality arise from electoral tactics, such as party splitting in some MMP systems, where the voters' true intent is difficult to determine.

Nonetheless, PR systems approximate proportionality much better than single-member plurality voting (SMP) and block voting. PR systems also are more resistant to gerrymandering and other forms of manipulation.

Some PR systems do not necessitate the use of parties; others do. The most widely used families of PR electoral systems are party-list PR, used in 85 countries; mixed-member PR (MMP), used in 7 countries; and single transferable vote (STV), used in Ireland, Malta, the Australian Senate, and the Indian Rajya Sabha. Proportional representation systems are used at all levels of government and are also used for elections to non-governmental bodies, such as corporate boards.

== Basics ==
Proportional representation refers to the general principle found in any electoral system in which the popularly chosen subgroups (parties) of an electorate are reflected proportionately in the elected body. To achieve that intended effect, proportional electoral systems need to either have more than one seat in each district (e.g., single transferable vote or STV), or have some form of compensatory seats (e.g., mixed-member proportional representation apportionment methods). A legislative body such as an assembly or parliament may be elected proportionally, whereas there is no need for a single office (e.g., a president or mayor) to be elected proportionately if no votes are for parties.

In the European Parliament, for instance, each member state has a number of seats that is (roughly) proportional to its population, enabling geographical and national proportional representation. For these elections, all European Union (EU) countries also must use a proportional electoral system (enabling political proportional representation): When n% of the electorate support a particular political party or set of candidates as their favourite, then roughly n% of seats are allotted to that party or those candidates. All PR systems aim to provide some form of equal representation for votes but may differ in their approaches on how they achieve this.

== Types ==
There are many different electoral systems that have been used or proposed to achieve proportional representation. Most can be classified as party-list PR, the single transferable vote, or mixed-member PR.

=== Party-list PR methods ===
Party-list PR is the most commonly used version of proportional representation. Each voter casts a vote for a single party and each party is allocated seats based on its share of the vote. The seats are assigned to party-affiliated candidates on the parties' electoral lists. The mechanism that allocates seats to the parties or lists is how these systems achieve proportionality.

A variety of list PR systems are in use today. Just a few party-list PR systems use overall country-wide vote counts. The Netherlands and Israel are the two main examples. Others count vote shares in separate districts and allocate seats in each part according to the party's vote count in the district. Denmark and some others use both, as a form of mixed member proportional.

Some common types of electoral lists are:

- Closed list systems, where each party lists its candidates according to the party's candidate selection process. This sets the order of candidates on the list and thus, in effect, their probability of being elected. The first candidate on a list, for example, will get the first seat that party wins. Each voter casts a vote for a list of candidates. Voters, therefore, do not have the option to express their preferences at the ballot as to which of a party's candidates are elected into office. A party is allocated seats in proportion to the number of votes it receives.
- Ley de lemas, an intermediate system formerly used in Uruguay, where each party (Lema) presents several closed lists (sublemas), each representing a faction or specific platform. Seats are allocated to parties according to the parties' shares of votes, then to each sublema proportionally, by the order of the names on the list.
- Open list systems, where voters may vote, depending on the model, for one person, or for two or more, or vote for a party list but indicate their order of preference within the list. The relative popularity of individual candidates are used to allocate the seats, apart from the list. Votes determine which of the party's candidates are elected. Nevertheless, the number of candidates elected from each list is determined by the number of votes that the list receives or that the candidates on the list receive overall.
- Localized list systems, where parties divide their candidates in single member–like constituencies, which are ranked inside each general party list depending by their percentages. This method allows electors to judge every single candidate as in a first-past-the-post (FPTP) system.
- Two-tier party list systems, as in Denmark, Norway, and Sweden. These operate similarly to mixed-member proportional systems or additional member systems. For example, Denmark is divided into ten multiple-member voting districts arranged in three regions, electing 135 representatives. In addition, 40 compensatory seats are elected. Voters have one vote. It is cast for an individual candidate or for a party list on the district ballot. To determine district winners, parties are allocated district seats based on their district vote shares. Candidates in the district are apportioned their share of their party's district list vote plus their individual votes, and the most popular are elected to fill their party's seats. Compensatory seats are apportioned to regions according to the party vote share aggregated nationally, and then to the districts where the compensatory representatives are determined. In the 2007 general election, the district magnitudes, including compensatory representatives, varied between 14 and 28. The basic design of the system has remained unchanged since its introduction in 1920.
- The simplest list PR system is the schedule plan where multiple members are elected in a contest, and each voter casts a single vote, which is counted both for a specific candidate and also for a party list. The seats are filled with the most popular candidates of the most popular parties. If quota is used, surplus votes of early winners can be put in the party pool of votes for determination of later seats.

List PR systems are used in Finland (open list), Latvia (open list), Sweden (open list), Israel (national closed list), Brazil (open list), Kazakhstan (closed list), Nepal (closed list) as adopted in 2008 in first CA election, the Netherlands (open list), Russia (closed list), South Africa (closed list), Democratic Republic of the Congo (open list), and Ukraine (open list). For elections to the European Parliament, most member states use open lists, but most large EU countries use closed lists, so that the majority of EP seats are distributed by those. Local lists were used to elect the Italian Senate during the second half of the 20th century.

==== Example ====
An example election where the assembly has 200 seats to be filled is presented below. Every voter casts their vote for the list created by their favourite party and the results of the election are as follows (popular vote). Under party-list PR, every party gets a number of seats proportional to their share of the popular vote.

Party	Popular vote	Party-list PR – Sainte-Laguë method	
Party	Popular vote	Number of seats	Seats %
Party A	43.91%	88	44%
Party B	39.94%	80	40%
Party C	9.98%	20	10%
Party D	6.03%	12	6%
TOTAL	99.86%	200	100%

This is done by a proportional formula or method: for example, the Sainte-Laguë method – these are the same methods that may be used to allocate seats for geographic proportional representation (for example, how many seats each state gets in the US House of Representatives). Votes and seats often cannot be mathematically perfectly allocated, so some amount of rounding has to be done. The various methods deal with this in different ways, although the difference is reduced if there are many seats – for example, if the whole country is one district. In practice, party-list PR is also more complicated than in the example, as list PR used by countries often use more than one district, two or three tiers (e.g. local, regional and national), open lists and electoral thresholds. Final seat allocations are frequently not proportional to the parties' vote share.

=== Single transferable vote (STV) ===
The single transferable vote is an older method than party-list PR, and it does not need to involve parties. Instead of the process used in list PR, where parties put forward ordered lists of candidates from which winners are drawn in some order, under STV voters vote directly for candidates, who run by name. Instead of each voter only marking their first preference, as in FPTP and list PR, under STV a voter has opportunity to rank two or more candidates by preference, with only one marked preference used to place the vote. Votes cast for candidates determine the winners by relative popularity either by achieving a quota or by relative plurality at the end of the vote count process.

STV uses preferential ballots. The ranking is used to instruct election officials as to how the vote should be transferred in case the first preference is marked for an unelectable candidate or for an elected candidate who has an excess of votes needed to guarantee election. Each voter casts one vote. The district used elects multiple members (more than one, often 3 to 7, with 37 being the current maximum use in a government election in the world). Because parties play no role in the vote count, STV may be used for nonpartisan elections, as with the city council of Cambridge, Massachusetts. A large proportion of the votes cast are used to actually elect someone, so the result is mixed and balanced, with no one voting block taking much more than its due share of the seats. Where party labels are indicated, proportionality party-wise is noticeable.

Counting votes under STV is more complicated than under first-past-the-post voting, but the example belows shows how the vote count is performed and how proportionality is achieved in a district with 3 seats. In reality, districts usually elect more members than that in order to achieve more proportional results. A risk is that if the number of seats is larger than, for example, 10 seats, the ballot will be so large as to be inconvenient and voters may find it difficult to rank the many candidates, although 21 are elected through STV in some elections. In many STV systems, voters are not required to mark more choices than desired. Even if all voters marked only one preference, the resulting representation would be more balanced than under single-winner FPTP, due to each voter having just one vote and districts electing multiple members under STV.

Under STV, the quota, the share of the vote that guarantees election, is determined beforehand. The Droop quota is commonly used. In a three-seat district, any candidate who earns more than 25 percent of the vote is declared elected. Note that it is only possible for three candidates to each achieve that quota.

In Cambridge, under STV, 90 percent of voters see their vote help to elect a candidate, more than 65 percent of voters see their first-choice candidate elected, and more than 95 percent of voters see one of their top three choices win.

Other reports claim that 90 percent of voters have a representative to whom they gave their first preference. Voters can choose candidates using any criteria they wish; the proportionality is implicit. Another source states that, when STV was used between 1925 and 1955 in Cincinnati, 90 percent of voters saw either their first choice elected or their vote was used to elect a secondary preference, with about 60 to 74 percent of voters seeing their first choice elected, even if their vote was not used to elect that person because it was transferred on as a surplus vote.

STV does not require political parties; party-list PR and MMP systems both presume that parties reflect voters wishes, which Nicolaus Tideman argues gives too much power to party officials. STV satisfies the electoral system criterion proportionality for solid coalitions – a solid coalition for a set of candidates is the group of voters that rank all those candidates above all others – and is therefore considered a system of proportional representation.

However, the small district magnitude used in STV elections (usually 5 to 9 seats, but sometimes rising to 21) has been criticized as impairing proportionality, especially when more parties compete than there are seats available, and STV has, for this reason, sometimes been labelled "quasi proportional".

Even though Ireland has particularly small magnitudes (3 to 5 seats), results of STV elections are "highly proportional". In its 1997 election, the average magnitude was 4. Eight parties gained representation, four of them with less than 3% of first-preference votes nationally. Six independent candidates also won election.

Some have claimed that STV softens the extreme views of a candidate because, to gain transfers based on back-up preferences and so improve their chance of election, the candidate needs to canvass voters beyond their own circle of supporters, and so moderates their statements. This argument is based on the high effective threshold that is a characteristic of STV in districts with only a few members.

Conversely, widely respected candidates can win election even if they receive relatively few first preferences. They do this by benefiting from strong subordinate preference support. Of course, they must have enough initial support so that they are not in the bottom rung of popularity and are eliminated as the field of candidate is thinned.

Charles Dodgson (Lewis Carroll), the polymath logician and author, developed a passionate interest in voting methods. He stated that STV was fundamentally flawed, particularly regarding the allocation of "surplus" votes. His novel solution was to let the candidates themselves caucus and "club" votes together through the process of a negotiated consensus. As he stated:

May I, in conclusion, point out that the method advocated in my pamphlet (where each elector names one candidate only, and the candidates themselves can, after the numbers are announced, club their votes, so as to bring in others besides those already announced as returned) would be at once perfectly simple and perfectly equitable in its result?

However, Lord Salisbury, leader of the United Kingdom's Conservative Party and future prime minister, rejected the adoption of "clubbing" in 1884, describing it as "too sweeping a change". Subsequently, Dodgson joined with Thomas Hare and several Conservative and Liberal members of Parliament to found the Proportional Representation Society (later the Electoral Reform Society) and to pursue STV. (Dogson's candidate-driven pooling or transfer of votes may be echoed in indirect single transferable voting and in some of today's liquid democracy proposals.)

==== Example ====
In the below example, five candidates from two parties run in a three-seat district.

In the first count, the first preference (favourite candidate) marked on each of the ballots is counted. Candidates whose vote tally equals or exceeds the quota are declared elected as shown in the example below.

Simplified example of an STV ballot

The table below shows the initial count, or first round or stage, of the vote count process.

Quota is 25 percent plus 1 (Droop quota).

Jane Doe and Fred Rubble are elected in the first round.

Candidate	Party	Popular vote (first preferences)	Elected?	If elected: surplus votes
Jane Doe	Party A	40%	Yes	15%
Fred Rubble	Party B	30%	Yes	5%
Joe Smith	Party A	16%		
John Citizen	Party A	11%		
Mary Hill	Party B	3%		
TOTAL		100%		

Next, surplus votes belonging to those already elected, votes the candidates received above the quota (votes that they did not need to be elected), are transferred to the next preference marked by the voters who voted for them. Continuing the example, suppose that all voters who marked first preference for Jane Doe marked John Citizen as their second choice. Based on this, Jane Doe's surplus votes are transferred to John Citizen. John Citizen achieves the quota and so is declared elected to the third and last seat that had to be filled.

Even if all of Fred Rubble's surplus had gone to Joe Smith, the vote transfer plus Smith's original votes would not add up to quota.

Party B did not have two quotas of votes so was not due two seats, while Party A – with 67 percent of the vote – was. It is possible, in realistic STV elections, for a candidate to win without quota if they are still in the running when the field of candidates has thinned to the number of remaining open seats.

In this example, the district result is balanced party-wise. No one party took all the seats, as frequently happens under FPTP or other non-proportional voting systems. The result is fair – the most popular party took two seats; the less popular party took just one.

As well, the most popular candidates in each party won the party's seats. 81 percent of the voters saw their first choice elected. At least 15 percent of them (the Doe first, Citizen second voters) saw both their first and second choices elected – they were likely more than 15 percent if some "Citizen first" votes gave their second preference to Doe. Every voter had the satisfaction of seeing someone of the party they support elected in the district.

Quota is 25 percent plus 1

Candidate	Party	Current vote total	Elected?	Party	First-preference votes for candidates of party	Number of seats	Party seats % under STV
Jane Doe	Party A	Already elected (25%+1 vote)	Yes	Party A	67%	2	67%
John Citizen	Party A	11% + 15% = 26%	Yes	Party A	67%	2	67%
Joe Smith	Party A	16%		Party A	67%	2	67%
Fred Rubble	Party B	Already elected (30%) (surplus votes not transferred)	Yes	Party B	33%	1	33%
Mary Hill	Party B	3%		Party B	33%	1	33%
TOTAL		100%	3		100%	3	100%

Under STV, to make up a 200-seat legislature as large as in the examples that follow, about 67 three-seat districts would be used. Districts with more seats would provide more proportional results – one form of STV in Australia uses a district with 21 members being elected at once. With a larger district magnitude, it is more likely that more than two parties will have some of their candidates elected.

With a lower district magnitude, it is more likely that only two parties will have their candidates elected. For example, in Malta, where STV is used with 5-member districts, it is common for successful candidates to receive 16.6 percent of the vote in the district. This produces a high effective threshold in the districts, and the country maintains a very strong two-party system. However, about 4000 voters in a district would be enough to elect a third-party candidate if voters desired, but this seldom happens.

Conversely, New South Wales, which uses STV to elect its state legislative council in 21-seat contests, sees election of representatives of seven or eight different parties each time. In this election, about 1/22nd of the vote in the state is enough to take a seat, and seven or eight parties take at least that many votes, demonstrating a different voting pattern than Malta exhibits.

=== Mixed-member proportional representation (MMP) ===
Some election systems combine district results with more general proportionality through the use of levelling seats. The most prominent mixed compensatory system is mixed-member proportional representation (MMP).

MMP combines election of individual district members with election of some members due to their party's vote share. In rare cases (such as New Zealand, Lesotho and a few other places), MMP systems use single-member districts to elect district members. These mixed electoral systems combine a plurality/majority formula with a proportional formula or use the proportional component to compensate for disproportionality caused by the plurality/majority component.

More commonly (in Denmark, Iceland, Sweden, and South Africa), multi-member districts are used in the countries' MMP electoral systems. After district results are known, additional compensatory members are then elected from party lists to achieve an overall party share proportional to the vote (according to an allocation method much like in party-list PR). Voters sometimes have two votes, one for the election of their district representative and one used to allocate party list top-up seats. In some system such as Denmark's, each voter casts just one vote.

The main idea behind MMP is that the levelling seats act as compensation. The list-PR seat allocation is dependent on votes cast (in some systems, on the party list votes cast, separately from the district votes) and on the results of the district-level election contests. Single-member districts cannot be proportional as they are inherently winner-takes-all, so the disproportionalities are compensated by the party-list top-up seats as much as possible. MMP has the potential to produce proportional or moderately proportional election outcomes, depending on several factors, such as the ratio of FPTP seats to PR seats, the existence or nonexistence of extra compensatory seats to make up for overhang seats, the use or not of fair voting in multi-member districts, and electoral thresholds.

MMP was invented for the German Bundestag after the Second World War, and its use has spread to Lesotho, Bolivia, New Zealand and Thailand. The system is also used for the Scottish Parliament, where it is called the additional member system.

The proportionality of MMP can be compromised if the ratio of list to district seats is too low, as it may then not be possible to completely compensate district seat disproportionality. Another factor can be how overhang seats are handled, district seats that a party wins in excess of the number due to it under the list vote. To achieve proportionality, other parties require "balance seats", increasing the size of parliament by twice the number of overhang seats, but this is not always done. Until recently, Germany increased the size of parliament by the number of overhang seats (the additional seats were awarded to under-represented parties) but did not use the increased size for apportioning list seats. This was changed for the 2013 national election after the constitutional court rejected the previous law, ruling that not compensating for the added overhang compensation seats had resulted in a negative vote weight effect. Lesotho, Scotland and Wales do not increase the size of parliament at all, even if there are overhang seats.

In New Zealand, electorate seats make up approximately 60% of the seats in Parliament, allowing potential for overhangs. When overhangs occur, some seats are added to the chamber and awarded to parties suffering from under-representation. Until 2023, no more than three seats were added to the standard 120 seats, but the 2026 election resulted in 11 overhang seats, so the size of parliament was increased to a record 131 seats. The overhangs were caused by the National Party receiving many electorate votes but a lesser share of the party vote, uneven performance by parties in electorate votes, and partisan strategies aimed at engineering overhangs on both sides of the political spectrum. In 2012 and 2023, parliamentary commissions proposed ending provisions for compensating for overhang. The commissions did not specifically anticipate 2026's circumstances. They supported retaining approximately 60% electorate seats. They proposed ending overhang compensation seats as a necessary part of a "package" of changes (the commissions presented similar packages). Alongside slightly reducing the party vote threshold (from 5% to 4% or 3.5%), the commissions proposed abolishing the electorate seat threshold whereby parties winning an electorate seat qualified for their due share of levelling seats. Ending this electorate seat threshold may produce more overhang seats, and the commissions proposed that any party's electorate seat wins exceeding their party vote share would reduce the list seats available to other parties, which would cause a reduction of proportionality. The commissions modelled their proposals against previous election results and found proportionality would have been similar or improved. No changes were made after the reviews. The 2026 election campaign and result saw calls for changes to the system, although the levelling seats and overhang compensation seats did produce a more proportional result than would have been produced with just the 71 first-past-the-post contests.

A simple, yet common, version of MMP has as many list-PR seats as there are single-member districts. In the example it can be seen, as is often the case in reality, that the results of the district elections are highly disproportional: large parties typically win more seats than they should proportionally, but there is also randomness – a party that receives more votes than another party might not win more seats than the other. Any such disproportionality produced by the district elections is addressed, where possible, by the allocation of the compensatory additional members.

Results under mixed-member proportional representation
Party	Popular vote	FPTP seats (number of districts won)	Compensatory seats (party-list PR seats)	Total number of seats	Seats %
Party A	43.91%	64	24	88	44%
Party B	39.94%	33	47	80	40%
Party C	9.98%	0	20	20	10%
Party D	6.03%	3	9	12	6%
TOTAL	100%	100	100	200	100%

A variant of MMP is mixed single vote (MSV), in which voters only have one vote that functions for both district members and compensatory members. MSV may use a positive vote transfer system, where unused votes are transferred from the lower tier to the compensatory tier, where only these are used in the proportional formula. Alternatively, the MMP (seat linkage) algorithm can be used with a mixed single vote to "top-up" to a proportional result. With MSV, the similar requirements as in MMP apply to guarantee an overall proportional result.

Parallel voting systems use proportional formulas to allocate seats on a proportional tier separately from other tiers. Certain systems, like scorporo, use a proportional formula after combining results of a parallel list vote with transferred votes from lower tiers (using negative or positive vote transfer).

==== Differences from mixed-member majoritarian system ====
Compare the MMP example to a mixed-member majoritarian system, where the party-list PR seat allocation is independent of the district results (this is also called parallel voting). Under a mixed-member majoritarian system, there is no compensation (no regard to how the district seats were filled) when allocating party-list seats so as to produce a proportional allocation of seats overall. The popular vote, the number of district seats won by each party, and the number of district and party-list PR seats are the same as in the MMP example above, yet the parties' seat tallies are different.

Parallel voting (using non-compensatory party seats):

Results under parallel voting
Party	Popular vote	FPTP seats (number of districts won)	Party-list PR seats	Total number of seats	Seats %
Party A	43.91%	64	44	108	54.0%
Party B	39.94%	33	40	73	36.5%
Party C	9.98%	0	10	10	5.0%
Party D	6.03%	3	6	9	4.5%
TOTAL	100%	100	100	200	100%

The overall results are not proportional, although they are more balanced and fair than most single-winner first-past-the-post elections. Parallel voting is mostly semi-proportional. Mixed systems are the most proportional if the additional members are allocated in a compensatory way.

==== Dual-member mixed proportional (DMP) ====
Another MMP type system is dual-member mixed proportional (DMP). It is a single-vote system that elects two representatives in every district. The first seat in each district is awarded to the candidate who wins a plurality of the votes, similar to FPTP voting. The remaining seats are awarded in a compensatory manner to achieve proportionality across a larger region. DMP employs a formula similar to the "best near-winner" variant of MMP used in the German state of Baden-Württemberg. In Baden-Württemberg, compensatory seats are awarded to candidates who receive high levels of support at the district level compared with other candidates of the same party. DMP differs in that at most one candidate per district is permitted to obtain a compensatory seat. If multiple candidates contesting the same district are slated to receive one of their parties' compensatory seats, the candidate with the highest vote share is elected and the others are eliminated. DMP is similar to STV in that all elected representatives, including those who receive compensatory seats, serve their local districts. Invented in 2013 in the Canadian province of Alberta, DMP received attention on Prince Edward Island where it appeared on a 2016 plebiscite as a potential replacement for FPTP, but was eliminated on the third round. It was also one of three proportional voting system options on a 2018 referendum in British Columbia.

=== Biproportional apportionment ===
Biproportional apportionment aims to achieve proportionality in two dimensions, for example: proportionality by region and proportionality by party. There are several mathematical methods to attain biproportionality.

One method is called iterative proportional fitting (IPF). It was proposed for elections by the mathematician Michel Balinski in 1989, and first used by the city of Zürich for its council elections in February 2006, in a modified form called "new Zürich apportionment" (Neue Zürcher Zuteilungsverfahren). Zürich had had to modify its party-list PR system after the Swiss Federal Court ruled that its smallest wards, as a result of population changes over many years, unconstitutionally disadvantaged smaller political parties. With biproportional apportionment, the use of open party lists has not changed, but the way winning candidates are determined has. The proportion of seats due to each party is calculated according to their overall citywide vote, and then the district winners are adjusted to conform to these proportions. This means that some candidates, who would otherwise have been successful, can be denied seats in favour of initially unsuccessful candidates, in order to improve the relative proportions of their respective parties overall. This peculiarity is accepted by the Zürich electorate because the resulting city council is proportional and all votes, regardless of district magnitude, now have equal weight. The system has since been adopted by other Swiss cities and cantons.

Balinski has proposed another variant called fair majority voting (FMV) to replace single-winner plurality or majoritarian electoral systems, in particular the system used for the US House of Representatives. FMV introduces proportionality without changing the method of voting, the number of seats, or the – possibly gerrymandered – district boundaries. Seats would be apportioned to parties in a proportional manner at the state level. In a related proposal for the UK parliament, whose elections are contested by many more parties, the authors note that parameters can be tuned to adopt any degree of proportionality deemed acceptable to the electorate. In order to elect smaller parties, a number of constituencies would be awarded to candidates placed fourth or even fifth in the constituency – unlikely to be acceptable to the electorate, the authors concede – but this effect could be substantially reduced by incorporating a third, regional, apportionment tier, or by specifying minimum thresholds.

=== Proportional approval voting ===
Proportional approval voting (PAV) is like STV in that voters vote for candidates and not for parties. Rather than ranking candidates, each voter casts approval votes for any number of candidates. It satisfies an adaptation of PR called extended justified representation (EJR).

When there are many seats to be filled, as in a legislature, counting ballots under PAV may not be feasible, so sequential variants have been used, such as sequential proportional approval voting (SPAV). SPAV was used briefly in Sweden during the early 1900s. The vote counting procedure occurs in rounds. The first round of SPAV is identical to approval voting. All ballots are added with equal weight, and the candidate with the highest overall score is elected. In all subsequent rounds, ballots that support candidates who have already been elected are added with a reduced weight. Thus, voters who support none of the winners in the early rounds are increasingly likely to elect one of their preferred candidates in a later round. The procedure has been shown to yield proportional outcomes especially when voters are loyal to distinct groups of candidates (e.g. political parties).

Reweighted range voting (RRV) uses the same method as sequential proportional approval voting but uses a score ballot. Reweighted range voting was used for the nominations in the Visual Effects category for recent Academy Award Oscars from 2013 through 2017, and is used in the city of Berkeley, California, for sorting the priorities of the city council.

== Districting under proportional representation ==
All PR systems require multi-member election contests, meaning votes are pooled to elect multiple representatives at once. Pooling at the national level may be done in multi-member voting districts (in STV and most list-PR systems) or in single countrywide – a so-called at-large – district (in only a few list-PR systems). A country-wide pooling of votes to elect more than a hundred members is used in Angola, for example.

Where PR is desired at the municipal level, a city-wide at-large districting is sometimes used, to allow as large a district magnitude as possible. In other cases, multi-member wards are used.

For large districts, party-list PR is often used, but even when list PR is used, districts contain on average 14 members.

STV, a candidate-based PR system, has only rarely been used to elect more than 21 in a single contest. (Note: STV was used in 2010 to elect 25 members at large in the 2010 Icelandic Constitutional Assembly election.)

Some PR systems use party lists and at-large pooling or regional pooling in conjunction with single-member districts (such as New Zealand's MMP and Scotland's additional member system). Other PR systems use party lists and at-large pooling in conjunction with multi-member districts (Scandinavian countries). In these systems, votes are pooled to allocate leveling seats (top-up) to compensate for the disproportional results produced in single-member districts using FPTP or to increase the fairness already produced in multi-member districts using list PR. PR systems that achieve the highest levels of proportionality tend to use as general pooling as possible (typically country-wide) or districts with large numbers of seats (high district magnitude).

== Advantages and disadvantages ==
Researchers have repeatedly found multiparty proportional systems to improve voter turnout and satisfaction with less negative political debates and more representation among minorities. There is also some evidence that they handle pandemics better.

The case for a single transferable vote system, a form of proportional representation, was made by John Stuart Mill in his 1861 essay Considerations on Representative Government. His remarks are relevant to any form of PR.

In a representative body actually deliberating, the minority must of course be overruled; and in an equal democracy, the majority of the people, through their representatives, will outvote and prevail over the minority and their representatives. But does it follow that the minority should have no representatives at all? ... Is it necessary that the minority should not even be heard? Nothing but habit and old association can reconcile any reasonable being to the needless injustice. In a really equal democracy, every or any section would be represented, not disproportionately, but proportionately. A majority of the electors would always have a majority of the representatives, but a minority of the electors would always have a minority of the representatives. Man for man, they would be as fully represented as the majority. Unless they are, there is not equal government ... there is a part whose fair and equal share of influence in the representation is withheld from them, contrary to all just government, but, above all, contrary to the principle of democracy, which professes equality as its very root and foundation.

Mill's essay does not support party-based proportional representation and may indicate a distaste for the ills of party-based systems in saying:

Of all modes in which a national representation can possibly be constituted, this one affords the best security for the intellectual qualifications desirable in the representatives. At present, by universal admission, it is becoming more and more difficult for any one who has only talents and character to gain admission into the House of Commons. The only persons who can get elected are those who possess local influence, or make their way by lavish expenditure, or who, on the invitation of three or four tradesmen or attorneys, are sent down by one of the two great parties from their London clubs, as men whose votes the party can depend on under all circumstances.

Many political theorists agree with Mill that in a representative democracy, the representatives should represent all substantial segments of society but want reform rather than abolition of direct local community representation in the legislature. Mill himself only served one term as MP and then found it impossible to get a party to nominate him as their candidate. He was pointed out as an example of the kind of publicly spirited person who cannot even achieve a nomination under first-past-the-post.

STV and regionalized forms of additional-member systems or MMP systems (such as used to elect the Scottish Assembly) produce local area representation and overall PR through mixed, balanced representation at the district or regional level.

=== Fairness ===
PR is a replacement for unfair single-winner and winner-take-all systems such as plurality voting, where the largest parties typically receive an "unfair" seat bonus and smaller parties are disadvantaged, always under-represented, and on occasion win no representation at all (Duverger's law). Under FPTP, an established party in UK elections has been elected to majority government with as little as 33.7% of votes (in 2024); ten times on record since 1830, a UK government obtained the most seats while losing the popular vote to another party. In certain Canadian elections, majority governments have been formed by parties with the support of under 40 percent of votes cast (e.g., 2011 Canadian election, 2015 Canadian election). If turnout levels in the electorate are less than 60 percent, such outcomes allow a party to form a majority government by convincing as few as one quarter of the electorate to vote for it.

For example, in the 2005 UK election, the Labour Party won a parliamentary majority with the votes of only 21.6 percent of the total electorate, in part due to low voter turnout.

However, some PR systems reduce proportionality by having a high electoral threshold, so do not necessarily produce fairer results. The 2002 Turkish general election used an open list list PR system with a 10 percent threshold and wasted 46 percent of votes cast. The other 54 percent of the votes did receive fair representation, though.

Under first-past-the-post, a third or so of members are elected with less than half the votes cast in their district, the majority of voters in such districts not getting any local representation and, with no levelling seats being used, getting no representation entirely.

District-based winner-take-all systems also benefit regional parties by allowing them to win many seats in the region where they have a strong following even though they have less support nationally, while various Green parties and other parties with support that is not concentrated win few or no seats.

An example was Canada's 1993 election, when the Bloc Québécois won 52 seats, all in Quebec, on 14 percent of the national vote, which was 12 more seats than it would have earned if seats were allocated based on the popular vote. The Progressive Conservatives collapsed to two seats on 16 percent of the votes spread nationally, when it would have been due 48 under proportional representation. The Conservative party, although strong nationally, previously had won many of its seats in the West; in 1993, many of its Western supporters turned to the Reform Party (a regional party), which won all its seats west of Ontario and most of its seats west of Saskatchewan. The Conservative vote was spread so thinly that in only one riding did it take a majority of votes, and in only two ridings did it take plurality, enough votes to win the seat. In about 150 districts, the Conservative candidate received more than 15 percent of the vote, but in only two cases did the candidate take enough votes to win the seat. Under PR, the Conservative party's 16 percent of the votes would have been mirrored by elected representation (likely about 48 seats), while under FPTP, the use of 295 separate election contests, with no overarching mechanism of proportionality, meant almost all of the Conservative votes were wasted.

Similarly, in the 2015 UK general election, conducted using single-winner FPTP, the Scottish National Party gained 56 seats, all in Scotland, with a 4.7 percent share of the national vote, while the UK Independence Party, with 12.6 percent, won only a single seat.

=== Representation of minor parties ===
The use of multiple-member districts elects a greater variety of members compared to first-past-the-post. It has been argued that in emerging democracies, inclusion of minorities in the legislature can be essential for social stability and to consolidate the democratic process.

Critics of PR, on the other hand, claim inclusion can give extreme parties a foothold in parliament. With very low thresholds, very small parties can act as "king-makers", holding larger parties to ransom during coalition discussions. That is sometimes cited as a cause for the collapse of the Weimar government in post–World War I Germany, and the example of Israel is also often quoted. These problems can be limited, as in the modern German Bundestag, by the use of a high electoral threshold, limiting the parties that receive parliamentary representation. This would, however, increase the number of wasted votes, if voters cannot register alternate preferences.

Another criticism is that the dominant parties in plurality/majoritarian systems, often looked on as "coalitions" or as "broad churches", can fragment under PR as the election of candidates from smaller groups becomes possible. Israel, Brazil, and Italy (until 1993) are examples. However, research shows, in general, there is only a small increase in the number of parties in parliament (although small parties have larger representation) under PR.

Open list systems and STV, the only prominent PR system that does not require political parties, enable independent candidates to be elected. In Ireland, on average, about six independent candidates have been elected each parliament. This can lead to a situation where forming a Parliamentary majority requires support of one or more of these independent representatives. In some cases, these independents have positions that are closely aligned with the governing party and it hardly matters. The Irish Government formed after the 2016 election even included independent representatives in the cabinet of a minority government. In other cases, the independent member's electoral platform is entirely local and addressing this is a price for support.

=== Coalitions ===
The election of smaller parties gives rise to one of the principal objections to PR systems, that they almost always result in coalition governments.

Supporters of PR see coalitions as an advantage, forcing compromise between parties to form a coalition at the centre of the political spectrum, and often when an election forces government change, some of the old coalition are in the new coalition so PR produces continuity and stability. Opponents counter that with many policies, compromise is not possible. Neither can many policies be easily positioned on the left–right spectrum (for example, the environment). So policies are horse-traded during coalition formation, with the consequence that voters have no way of knowing which policies will be pursued by the government they elect. Also, coalitions do not necessarily form at the centre, and small parties can have excessive influence, supplying a coalition with a majority only on condition that a policy or policies favoured by few voters are adopted. Some say PR curtails the ability of voters to vote an unpopular party out of power or out of a governing coalition.

PR opponents contend these problems are avoided by two-party plurality voting systems. Coalitions are rare; the two dominant parties necessarily compete at the centre for votes, so that governments are more reliably moderate; the strong opposition necessary for proper scrutiny of government is assured; and governments remain sensitive to public sentiment because they can be, and are, regularly voted out of power. However, this is not necessarily so: a two-party system can result in a "drift to extremes", hollowing out the centre, or, at least, can result in one party drifting to an extreme. As well, a two-party election system may operate in an oligopolistic manner, with both parties ignoring a particular viewpoint (the two parties engaging in too much compromise), or one party may verge off, having been controlled by an extreme group, so creating polarization. A two-party plurality system means there are many safe seats, districts where only one party has a chance to be elected. This often leads to polarization and low voter turnout, and sometimes opens door to foreign interference at the nomination stage.

Some opponents of PR contend that coalition governments created under PR are less stable, and elections are more frequent. Italy is an often-cited example with many governments composed of many different coalition partners. However, Italy is unusual in that both its houses can make a government fall, whereas other countries, including many PR nations, have either just one house or have one of their two houses be the core body supporting a government. Italy's current parallel voting system is not PR, so Italy is not an appropriate candidate for measuring the stability of PR. Canada, which uses FPTP with a multi-party system, had more elections between 1945 and 2017 than PR countries such as Norway, Germany and Ireland.

=== Voter participation ===
Plurality systems usually result in single-party majority government because generally fewer parties are elected in large numbers under FPTP compared to PR, and FPTP compresses politics to little more than two-party contests. Relatively few votes in a few of the most finely balanced districts, the "swing seats", are able to swing majority control in the house. Incumbents in less evenly divided districts are invulnerable to slight swings of political mood. In the UK, for example, about half the constituencies have always elected the same party since 1945; in the 2012 US House elections, 45 districts (10% of all districts) were uncontested by one of the two dominant parties. Voters who know their preferred candidate will not win have little incentive to vote, and even if they do, their votes have no effect, although they are still counted in the popular vote calculation.

With PR, there are no swing seats. Most votes contribute to the election of a candidate, so parties need to campaign in all districts, not just those where their support is strongest or where they perceive most advantage. This fact in turn encourages parties to be more responsive to voters, producing a more "balanced" ticket by nominating more women and minority candidates. On average about 8 percent more women are elected in PR systems than non-PR systems.

Under PR, almost all votes count and are used to elect a winner. Because there are fewer wasted votes, voters, aware that their vote can make a difference, are more likely to make the effort to vote and are less likely to vote tactically as compared to voters under plurality systems. Compared to countries with plurality electoral systems, voter turnout improves and the population is more involved in the political process. However, some experts argue that transitioning from plurality to PR only increases voter turnout in geographical areas associated with safe seats under the plurality system; turnout may decrease in areas formerly associated with swing seats.

Proportional systems show higher political efficacy, citizens' trust in their ability to influence and understand the government, compared to plurality and majoritarian systems.

=== Gerrymandering ===
First-past-the-post elections are dependent on the drawing of boundaries of their single-member districts, a process vulnerable to political interference (gerrymandering) even if districts are drawn in such a way as to ensure approximately equal representation. However, because voter turnout varies from district to district and because in one district a winner might take 80 percent of the vote while in another the winner might be elected with only 30 percent of the vote, there might be wide variation in votes-per-winner, even if districts are drawn in such a way as to take in equivalent populations. As one party might take its seats with a low votes-per-winner ratio while another party might not have that advantage, the result is likely to be disproportionate.

To compound the problem, boundaries have to be periodically re-drawn to accommodate population changes. Even apolitically drawn boundaries can unintentionally produce the effect of gerrymandering, reflecting naturally occurring concentrations.

PR systems, due to having larger districts with multiple members, are less prone to gerrymandering – research suggests five-seat districts or larger are immune to gerrymandering.

Equality of size of multiple-member districts is not important (the number of seats can vary) so districts can be aligned with historical territories of varying sizes such as cities, counties, states or provinces. Later population changes can be accommodated by simply adjusting the number of representatives in the district, without having to re-draw boundaries. For example, Mollison in his 2010 plan for STV for the UK divided the country into 143 districts and then allocated varying number of seats to each district (to add up to the existing total of 650 MPs) depending on the number of voters in each but with some variation (his five-seat districts include one with 327,000 voters and another with 382,000 voters). His district boundaries follow historical county and local authority boundaries, yet he achieved more uniform representation than does the Boundary Commission, the body responsible for balancing the UK's first-past-the-post constituency sizes.

Mixed-member systems are susceptible to gerrymandering for the local seats that remain a part of such systems. Under parallel voting, a semi-proportional system, there is no compensation for the effects that such gerrymandering might have. Under MMP, the use of compensatory list seats makes gerrymandering less of an issue. However, its effectiveness in this regard depends upon the features of the system, including the size of the regional districts, the relative share of list seats in the total, and opportunities for collusion that might exist. A striking example of how the compensatory mechanism can be undermined can be seen in the 2014 Hungarian parliamentary election, where the leading party, Fidesz, combined gerrymandering and decoy lists, which resulted in a two-thirds parliamentary majority from a 45% vote. This illustrates how certain implementations of mixed systems (if non-compensatory or insufficiently compensatory) can produce moderately proportional outcomes, similar to parallel voting.

=== Link between constituent and representative ===
It is generally accepted that a particular advantage of plurality electoral systems such as first-past-the-post, or majoritarian electoral systems such as the alternative vote, is the geographic link between representatives and their constituents. A notable critique of PR is that, because its multiple-member districts are larger than single-member districts, this link is weak.

Party-list PR systems without delineated districts, such as the Netherlands and Israel, have no geographic link between representatives and their constituents. This makes it more difficult for local or regional issues to be addressed at the national level. But very few countries use at-large districting.

Systems with relatively small multiple-member districts, in particular with STV, have both geographic link between voter and elected representative, and a large proportion of effective votes. About 90 percent of voters can consult a representative they voted for, someone whom they might think more sympathetic to their problem. In such cases, it is sometimes argued that constituents and representatives have a closer link; constituents have a choice of representative so they can consult one with particular expertise in the topic at issue. With multiple-member districts, prominent candidates have more opportunity to be elected in their home constituencies, which they know and can represent authentically. There is less likely to be a strong incentive to parachute them into constituencies in which they are strangers and thus less than ideal representatives. Mixed-member PR systems incorporate single-member districts to preserve the link between constituents and representatives. However, because up to half the parliamentary seats are list rather than district seats, the districts are necessarily up to twice as large as with a plurality/majoritarian system, where all representatives serve single-member districts.

An interesting case occurred in the Netherlands, when "out of the blue" a party for the elderly, the General Elderly Alliance, gained six seats in the 1994 election. The other parties had not paid attention, but this made them aware. With the next election, the Party of the Elderly was gone, because the established parties were listening to the elderly. Today, a party for older citizens, 50PLUS, has established itself in the Netherlands, albeit never winning as many as six seats.

This can be seen as an example how geographic representation is not all-important and does not overshadow all other particulars of the voting population. Voting in a single-member district restricts the voters to a specific geography where their votes either go to the winner in the district or are wasted. MMP allows a vote (in the form of the voter's party vote) to be used outside the district if necessary to produce representation for the voter.

=== Potential deadlock in presidential systems ===
In a presidential system, the president is chosen independently from the parliament. As a consequence, it is possible to have a divided government where a parliament and president have opposing views and cannot advance legislation without compromising. This distinguishes it from a parliamentary system, where the prime minister is elected by parliament and can be removed by parliament via a motion of no confidence.

It has been argued that PR in combination with presidentialism is especially likely to create divided governments – because PR favours governments of coalitions of many smaller parties, it makes it much less likely that the president's party will control the legislature than in a two-party system. Scott Mainwaring noted in 1993 that few multi-party presidential systems were stable – Chile between 1933 and 1973 was the only such system to last more than 25 years – and suggested that this was because deadlock between the president and legislature led to popular resentment, which fuelled instability. However, in 2023, Mainwaring wrote that many successful multi-party presidential systems had since arisen, causing him to change his position and support adopting PR in presidential democracies such as the United States.

Richard Pildes questioned whether the new evidence since 1993 was sufficient to contradict the earlier view of multi-party presidential systems as dangerous. He further argued that the division of a legislature into multiple parties undermines its ability to check the power of the presidency, as each party becomes dependent on the president to advance their agenda. Eduardo Mello and Matias Spektor argued that "the dynamics of multiparty presidentialism foster, and indeed depend upon, a political arena rife with rent-seeking and corrupt behavior".

== Attributes of PR systems ==
=== District magnitude ===
Academics agree that the most important influence on proportionality is an electoral district's magnitude, the number of representatives elected from the district. As magnitude increases, proportionality improves.

At one extreme, where the district encompasses the entire country (and with a low electoral threshold, highly proportionate representation of political parties can result), parties gain by broadening their appeal by nominating more minority and women candidates. Very few countries elect using an at-large district – only the Netherlands, Israel, and a few others. Almost all PR systems use multi-member districts that divide the electorate while producing local representation.

At the other extreme, the binomial electoral system used in Chile between 1989 and 2013, a nominally proportional open list system, featured two-member districts. In some of those elections, a party with more than a quarter of the vote in a district was ignored. As well, overall it gave just one seat to a party with 5 percent of the vote. It is generally not considered a genuinely proportional system.

Similar plans for very small districts that produce quasi- or semi-proportional representation have been proposed in the United States and United Kingdom. For instance, the FairVote plan for STV in the US House of Representatives proposes three- to five-member districts. Under such a system, due to the rules of STV and the use of the Droop quota, a candidate with around one-fourth of the vote in a district would win a seat; thus, in most districts, it is expected that no one party would take all the seats in a district.

Mollison's plan for STV in the UK proposes four- and five-member districts mostly, with three- and six-seat districts used as necessary to fit existing boundaries, and even two-seat and single-member districts used where geography dictates.

After the introduction of STV in Ireland in 1921, district magnitudes were intermittently cut as more and more three-member constituencies were established, benefiting the dominant Fianna Fáil party, until 1979, when an independent boundary commission was established and began to make districts larger again. In 2010, a parliamentary constitutional committee recommended a minimum magnitude of four but that was not implemented. Currently every Dáil constituency elects three, four or five TDs.

=== Electoral threshold ===
The electoral threshold is the minimum number of votes required to win one seat. The lower the threshold, the higher the proportion of votes contributing to the election of representatives and the lower the proportion of votes wasted. An explicit threshold requires parties to win a certain percentage of the vote in order to be awarded seats from the party lists, and otherwise denies any representation to parties. By contrast, a natural threshold (equal to a Droop quota) is the smallest number of votes needed to mathematically guarantee a seat.

In New Zealand, which uses mixed-member proportional representation, the electoral threshold is 5% of the national vote but parties that win at least one constituency seat get their due number of seats even if they do not achieve the threshold.

Turkey sets its electoral threshold at 7 percent, while the Netherlands sets its threshold at a single Hare quota, or 0.67 percent of national vote count.

Israel has raised its threshold from 1 percent (before 1992) to 1.5 percent (1992–2004), to 2 percent (in 2006), and to 3.25 percent in 2014. Because that country uses at-large districting, the natural threshold would be less than 1 percent, much lower than the electoral threshold.

South Africa has no explicit electoral threshold.

In STV elections, a candidate winning an electoral quota's worth of votes (usually the Droop quota) is assured election, and thus that candidate's party would win one seat in the district.

=== Party magnitude ===
Party magnitude is the number of candidates elected from one party in one district. As district magnitude increases, it is likely more parties will elect larger delegations in the district and thus enjoy larger party magnitude.

As party magnitude increases, a party may decide to broaden its appeal by nominating women and members of minority groups. A balanced ticket will be more successful than a narrow slate. This encourages parties to nominate women and minority candidates.

However, under STV, nominating too many candidates can be counter-productive, splitting the first-preference votes and allowing candidates to be eliminated before receiving transferred votes from elected or eliminated candidates of the same party and of other parties. An example of this was identified in a ward in the 2007 Scottish local elections, where Labour, putting up three candidates, won only one seat while they might have won two if they had only run two and party support (as seen in first-preference votes) had been redistributed among just the two.

The same effect may have contributed to the collapse of representation of Fianna Fáil in the 2011 Irish general election. The party received about half the votes compared to the previous election but received only one quarter of the seats it had received in that earlier election. In Dublin, for example, it ran 13 candidates but elected just one.

But generally in STV contests, transfers of votes allow each party to take roughly its due share of the seats based on vote tallies of the party's candidates. As well, where all the candidates of a party preferred by a voter are eliminated, the vote may find usefulness by being transferred to a candidate of a different party who is liked by the voter.

=== Others ===
Other aspects of PR can influence proportionality such as the size of the elected body, the choice of open or closed lists, ballot design, and vote counting methods.

== Measuring disproportionality ==
Exact proportionality has a single unambiguous definition: the seat share must exactly equal the vote share, measured by the seats-to-votes ratio. When this condition is violated, the allocation is disproportional, and it may be interesting to examine the degree of disproportionality – the degree to which the number of seats won by each party differs from that of a perfectly proportional outcome. This degree does not have a single unambiguous definition. Some common disproportionality indexes are:

- The Gallagher Index – involves squaring the difference between each party's vote share and seat share, and finding the square root of half of the sum of these amounts.
- Wasted vote, which counts votes cast for parties that did not obtain any seats (or votes not used to elect anyone at the district level, in systems where district-level electing is all that is used)
- The Sainte-Laguë Index – where the squared discrepancy from ideal seats-to-votes ratio is weighted equally for each voter.

Disproportionality changes from one election to another depending on voter behaviour and size of electoral threshold or natural threshold. This is seen in the number of wasted votes in New Zealand. In 2005 New Zealand general election, every party receiving more than 1 percent of the votes acquired seats due to every party at that level getting at least one seat in first-past-the-post voting. This election thus saw far fewer wasted votes compared to other elections when only the most popular parties took district seats.

Different indexes measure different concepts of disproportionality. Some disproportionality concepts have been mapped to social welfare functions.

Disproportionality indexes are sometimes used to evaluate existing and proposed electoral systems. For example, the Canadian Parliament's 2016 Special Committee on Electoral Reform recommended that if the existing election system was replaced, the new system should be designed to achieve "a Gallagher score of 5 or less". This low level of disproportionality is consistently achieved in European PR but is much lower than was produced in the 2015 Canadian election under first-past-the-post voting, where the Gallagher index was 12.

== History ==
=== Pre–19th century ===
One of the earliest proposals for proportionality in an assembly was by John Adams in his influential pamphlet Thoughts on Government, written in 1776 during the American Revolution:

It should be in miniature, an exact portrait of the people at large. It should think, feel, reason, and act like them. That it may be the interest of this Assembly to do strict justice at all times, it should be an equal representation, or in other words equal interest among the people should have equal interest in it.

Mirabeau, speaking to the Assembly of Provence in France on 30 January 1789, was also an early proponent of a proportionally representative assembly:

A representative body is to the nation what a chart is for the physical configuration of its soil: in all its parts, and as a whole, the representative body should at all times present a reduced picture of the people, their opinions, aspirations, and wishes, and that presentation should bear the relative proportion to the original precisely.

In February 1793, the Marquis de Condorcet led the drafting of the Girondist constitution, which proposed a limited voting scheme with proportional aspects. Before that could be voted on, the Montagnards took over the National Convention and produced their own constitution. On 24 June, Saint-Just proposed the single non-transferable vote, which is semi-proportional, for national elections, but the constitution was passed on the same day specifying first-past-the-post voting.

Already in 1787, James Wilson, like Adams a US Founding Father, understood the importance of multiple-member districts: "Bad elections proceed from the smallness of the districts which give an opportunity to bad men to intrigue themselves into office", and again, in 1791, in his Lectures on Law: "It may, I believe, be assumed as a general maxim, of no small importance in democratical governments, that the more extensive the district of election is, the choice will be the more wise and enlightened". The 1790 Constitution of Pennsylvania specified multiple-member districts for the state Senate and required their boundaries to follow county lines.

=== 19th century ===
A PR system that uses single transferable votes was invented in 1819 by an English schoolmaster, Thomas Wright Hill. He devised a "plan of election" for the committee of the Society for Literary and Scientific Improvement in Birmingham that used not only transfers of surplus votes from elected candidates but also transfers from candidates who did not have enough votes to be elected, a refinement that Carl Andræ and Hare initially omitted when they formulated their two versions of STV later. But the procedure seemed unsuitable for a public election and was not publicised. In 1839, Hill's son, colonial administrator Rowland Hill, recommended the concept for a city election in Adelaide, and a simple process was used in which voters were allowed to form groups that would each elect one representative. Each group, being equally sized, elected a representative with the same number of votes, ensuring election of a carpenter and a draper, with the rest of the seats filled through block voting.

The Sainte-Laguë method of party-list proportional representation was first described in 1832 by the American statesman and senator Daniel Webster.

The list plan system was conceived by Thomas Gilpin, a retired paper-mill owner, in a paper he read to the American Philosophical Society in Philadelphia in 1844: "On the representation of minorities of electors to act with the majority in elected assemblies". It ensured at least one popularly elected member for each part of a multi-member district and also district-wide party-balanced representation. It was never put into practical use, but even as late as 1914, it was put forward as a way to elect the US electoral college delegates and for local elections.

A practical election system using the single transferable vote (a combination of preferential voting and multi-member districts) was devised in Denmark by Carl Andræ, a mathematician. It was first used there in 1855, making it the oldest PR system.

STV was also invented (apparently independently) in the UK in 1857 by Thomas Hare, a London barrister, in his pamphlet The Machinery of Representation and expanded on in his 1859 Treatise on the Election of Representatives. The scheme was enthusiastically taken up by John Stuart Mill, ensuring international interest. The 1865 edition of Hare's book included the transfer of preferences from dropped candidates and the STV method was essentially complete, although Hare pictured the entire British Isles as one single district. Mill proposed it to the House of Commons in 1867, but the British parliament rejected it. The name of the system evolved from "Mr. Hare's scheme" to "proportional representation", then "proportional representation with the single transferable vote", and finally, by the start of the 20th century, to "the single transferable vote" or sometimes "proportional representation with grouped constituencies [multi-member districts]". Such a system was well suited to the British political tradition prevalent in the English-speaking world because under STV, votes are cast directly for individuals. STV in multi-member districts was later adopted for national elections in Malta (1921), the Republic of Ireland (1921) and Australia (1948).

In Australia, political activist Catherine Helen Spence became an enthusiast of STV and an author on the subject. Through her influence and the efforts of the Tasmanian politician Andrew Inglis Clark, Tasmania became an early pioneer of the system, electing the world's first legislators through STV in 1896, and again in 1900, prior to its federation into Australia.

=== 20th century ===
In Russia, Leon Trotsky had proposed the election of a new Soviet presidium with other socialist parties on the basis of proportional representation in September 1917.

In the UK, the 1917 Speaker's Conference recommended STV for all multi-seat Westminster constituencies, but it was only applied to university constituencies, lasting from 1918 until 1950, when the last of those constituencies were abolished.

An occupation-based form of PR was put forward by Canadian agrarian leader Henry Wise Wood in 1919. The "group government" concept was defended in Alberta political activist William Irvine's 1920 book The Farmers in Politics. It echoes some visions of syndicalist government.

In Ireland, STV was used in 1918 in the Dublin University constituency and was introduced for devolved elections in 1921.

STV is currently used for two national lower houses of parliament: Ireland, since independence (as the Irish Free State) in 1922; and Malta, since 1921, long before independence in 1966. In Ireland, two attempts were made by Fianna Fáil governments to abolish STV and replace it with the first-past-the-post plurality system. Both attempts were rejected by voters in referendums held in 1959 and again in 1968. STV is also prescribed for all other elections in Ireland, including that of the presidency, although it is there effectively the alternative vote, as it is an election with a single winner.

It is also used for the Northern Ireland Assembly and European and local authorities, Scottish local authorities, some New Zealand and Australian local authorities, the Tasmanian (since 1907) and Australian Capital Territory assemblies, where the method is known as Hare–Clark, and the city council in Cambridge, Massachusetts (since 1941).

The D'Hondt method was devised in 1878 by Belgian mathematician Victor D'Hondt as a way to allocate seats in a party-list PR system. Some Swiss cantons started using it to produce PR, beginning with Ticino in 1890. Victor Considerant, a utopian socialist, described a similar system in an 1892 book. Many European countries adopted similar systems during or after World War I. List PR was favoured in Continental Europe because the use of lists in elections, the scrutin de liste, was already widespread. Each uses one of a variety of methods of allocating seats – the D'Hondt method, the Sainte-Laguë method or a different one.

Through the late 1800s and early 1900s, political reformers were involved in discussion and squabbles on the alternatives for the first-past-the-post or block voting systems that were being used. Cumulative voting, limited voting, supplementary voting (contingent voting), STV, instant-runoff voting, the Bucklin voting system of ranked (but non-transferable) votes, and list PR were used in different places, at the municipal, state or national level in that period. List PR and STV became the preferred alternative electoral methods for many jurisdictions by the 1920s. Denmark adopted a form of mixed-member proportional (MMP) in 1915, and several other countries adopted it after the Second World War.

District representation, proportionality of the results, the rate of wasted votes, the acceptable level of complication for voters and election officials, quickness of announcement of results and other aspects were often valued differently by the different reformers and by the elected governments who usually had the power to make decisions over electoral system. There is thus a wide range of PR systems used by the countries in the world that have adopted PR.

STV has some history in the United States. Between 1915 and 1962, twenty-four cities used the system for at least one election. In many cities, minority parties and other groups used STV to break up single-party monopolies on elective office. One of the most famous cases is New York City, where a coalition of Republicans and others pursued the adoption of STV in 1936 as part of an effort to free the city from control by the Tammany Hall political machine. Under the new electoral system, Tammany Hall's power was abated but NYC dropped STV in 1946 after only five elections. Another famous case is Cincinnati, Ohio, where, in 1924, Democrats and Progressive-wing Republicans secured the adoption of a council–manager charter with STV elections in order to dislodge the Republican machine of Rudolph K. Hynicka. Although Cincinnati's council–manager system survives, Republicans and other disaffected groups replaced STV with plurality-at-large voting in 1957. From 1870 to 1980, Illinois used a semi-proportional cumulative voting system to elect its House of Representatives. Each district across the state elected both Republicans and Democrats year-after-year.

Cambridge, Massachusetts (STV) and Peoria, Illinois (cumulative voting) have used PR for many years. Illinois used cumulative voting for decades in its state elections.

San Francisco used preferential voting (Bucklin voting) in its city elections around 1920 and then switched to STV.

=== 21st century ===
PR is used by most of the world's 33 most robust democracies with populations of at least 2 million people – 23 use PR (20 use list PR, 2 use MMP and 1 uses STV), while only 6 use plurality or a majoritarian system (runoff or instant runoff) for elections to the legislative assembly; and 4 use parallel systems, which usually involves some members being elected through PR. PR dominates Europe, including Germany and most of northern and eastern Europe; it is also used for European Parliament elections. France adopted PR at the end of World War II but discarded it in 1958; it was used for parliament elections in 1986. Switzerland has the most widespread use of proportional representation, as it is used there to elect not only national legislatures but also cantonal and communal legislatures.

PR is less common in the English-speaking world, especially at the national level. Malta and Ireland use STV for election of legislators. Australia uses it for senate elections. New Zealand adopted MMP in 1993. Gibraltar uses quasi-PR, limited voting.

The UK, Canada and India use first-past-the-post systems for legislative elections, but even then its use is a fairly recent phenomenon, with single-member plurality used exclusively at the national level in the UK only since 1958, in Canada only since 1968, and in India only since 1950. STV was used to elect British university MPs prior to 1958. As well, a variety of election systems were used in Canada to elect provincial legislators. STV was used to elect some provincial legislators in Alberta from 1924 to 1956, using multi-member districts that had been in use previously, and in Manitoba from 1920 to 1955. In both provinces, the alternative vote (AV) was used in rural areas alongside STV in the major urban centres. First-past-the-post was re-adopted in Alberta by the dominant party for reasons of political advantage. In Manitoba, a principal reason given was to address under-representation of Winnipeg in the provincial legislature (which could have otherwise been addressed by adding more members to urban districts using STV).

== List of countries using proportional representation ==
List of countries using proportional representation to elect the lower (or only) house of national legislature
Party list (closed list) Party list (open list) Party list (partly open list)	Panachage party list (open list)	Mixed member proportional	Additional member system	Localised personalised PR	Single transferable vote

Eighty-five countries in the world use a proportional electoral system to fill a nationally elected legislative body. Many other countries use proportional election systems to elect just some of its national legislators.

The table below lists those countries and gives information on the specific PR system that is in use.

Detailed information on electoral systems applying to the first chamber of the legislature is maintained by the ACE Electoral Knowledge Network. Countries using PR as part of a mixed-member majoritarian (e.g. parallel voting) system are not included.

Country	Body	Type of body	Type of proportional system	List type (if applicable)	Variation of open lists (if applicable)	Allocating formula	Electoral threshold	Constituencies	Governmental system	Notes
Albania	Parliament (Kuvendi)	Unicameral national legislature	Party-list PR	Open list	Partially open	D'Hondt method	4% nationally or 2.5% in a district	Counties	Parliamentary republic	
Algeria	People's National Assembly	Lower house of national legislature	Party-list PR	Open list	Fully open	Hare quota	5% of votes in respective district.	Provinces	Semi-presidential republic	
Angola	National Assembly	Lower house of national legislature	Party-list PR	Closed list	—	D'Hondt method		5 member districts and nationwide	Parliamentary republic with an executive presidency	Double simultaneous vote use to elect the President and the National Assembly at the same election.
Argentina	Chamber of Deputies	Lower house of national legislature	Party-list PR	Closed list	—	D'Hondt method	3% of registered voters	Provinces	Presidential republic	
Armenia	National Assembly	Unicameral national legislature	Party-list PR with majority jackpot and minority jackpot	Closed list	—	Largest remainder method (Hare quota)	5% (parties), 8-10% (blocs)	None (single nationwide constituency)	Parliamentary republic	
Aruba (Kingdom of the Netherlands)	Parliament	Unicameral constituent country legislature	Party-list PR	Open list	—	D'Hondt method	—	None (single nationwide constituency)		
Australia	Senate	Upper house of national legislature	Single transferable vote	—	—	Droop quota	—	States and territories of Australia	Federal parliamentary constitutional monarchy	
Austria	National Council	Lower house of national legislature	Party-list PR	Open list	More open: 14% on the district level	Hare quota	4%	Single-member districts within federal states (Länder)	Semi-presidential republic	
Austria	National Council	Lower house of national legislature	Party-list PR	Open list	More open: 10% on the regional (state) level	Hare quota	4%	Federal states (Länder)	Semi-presidential republic	
Austria	National Council	Lower house of national legislature	Party-list PR	Open list	More open: 7% of the on the federal level	D'Hondt method	4%	Single federal (nationwide) constituency	Semi-presidential republic	
Belgium	Chamber of Representatives	Lower house of national legislature	Party-list PR	Open list	Semi-open (flexible list)	D'Hondt method	5%	Electoral districts	Federal parliamentary constitutional monarchy	
Benin	National Assembly	Unicameral national legislature	Party-list PR	Closed list	—	Largest remainder method (? quota)	20%	Departments	Presidential republic	
Bolivia	Chamber of Deputies	Lower house of national legislature	Additional member system – MMP (fixed number of seats – no leveling seats)	Closed list	—	D'Hondt method	3%	Departments	Unitary presidential republic	Ballots use the double simultaneous vote: voters cast a single vote for a presidential candidate and their party's list and local candidates at the same time (vote splitting is not possible/allowed)
Bolivia	Chamber of Senators	Upper house of national legislature	Party-list PR	Closed list	—	D'Hondt method	3%	Departments	Unitary presidential republic	Ballots use the double simultaneous vote: voters cast a single vote for a presidential candidate and their party's list and local candidates at the same time (vote splitting is not possible/allowed)
Bosnia and Herzegovina	House of Representatives	Lower house of national legislature	Party-list PR	Open list	Semi-open (flexible list)	Sainte-Laguë method	—	Electoral districts	Federal parliamentary directorial republic	
Brazil	Chamber of Deputies	Lower house of national legislature	Party-list PR	Open list	Fully open	D'Hondt method	2% distributed in at least 9 federation units with at least 1% of the valid votes in each one of them	States and federal district	Presidential Republic	
Bulgaria	National Assembly	Unicameral national legislature	Party-list PR	Open list	Semi-open (flexible list)	D'Hondt method	4%	Electoral districts	Unitary parliamentary republic	
Burkina Faso	National Assembly	Unicameral national legislature	Party-list PR	Closed list	—	Hare quota	—	Provinces	Semi-presidential republic	
Burundi	National Assembly	Lower house of national legislature	Party-list PR	Closed list	—	D'Hondt method	2%	Provinces	Presidential republic	
Cape Verde	National Assembly	Unicameral national legislature	Party-list PR	Closed list	—	D'Hondt method	—	Constituencies	Semi-presidential republic	
Chile	Chamber of Deputies	Lower house of national legislature	Party-list PR	Open list	Fully open	D'Hondt method	No de jure threshold	Constituencies	Presidential republic	
Chile	Senate	Upper house of national legislature	Party-list PR	Open list	Fully open	D'Hondt method	No de jure threshold	Regions	Presidential republic	
Colombia	Chamber of Representatives	Lower house of national legislature	Party-list PR	Open list (mostly)	—	D'Hondt method	3%	Departments	Unitary presidential republic	
Colombia	Senate	Upper house of national legislature	Party-list PR	Open list (mostly)	—	D'Hondt method	3%	None (single nationwide constituency)	Unitary presidential republic	
Costa Rica	Legislative Assembly	Unicameral national legislature	Party-list PR	Closed list	—	Hare quota (modified)	—	Departments	Presidential republic	
Croatia	Sabor	Unicameral national legislature	Party-list PR	Open list		D'Hondt method	5%	Constituencies	Parliamentary republic	
Cyprus	House of Representatives	Unicameral national legislature	Party-list PR	Open list		Hare quota	—	Districts	Presidential republic	
Czech Republic	Chamber of Deputies	Lower house of national legislature	Party-list PR	Open list	Relatively open: 5% on the district level (among votes for the candidates party)	Imperiali quota	5% nationally for single party lists, 7% for coalitions of two, 11% for coalitions of more than 2.	Regions and capital	Parliamentary republic	
Czech Republic	Chamber of Deputies	Lower house of national legislature	Party-list PR	Open list	Relatively open: 5% on the district level (among votes for the candidates party)	Droop quota + largest remainders	5% nationally for single party lists, 7% for coalitions of two, 11% for coalitions of more than 2.	National remnant seats redistributed to districts	Parliamentary republic	
Denmark	Folketing	Unicameral national legislature	Party-list PR	Open list	Relatively open:	Hare quota + largest remainders for leveling seats	2% nationwide or one constituency seat or Hare quota is 2/3 electoral provinces	Nationwide leveling seats redistributed to constituencies	Parliamentary system	135 constituency seats, 40 leveling seats
Denmark	Folketing	Unicameral national legislature	Party-list PR	Open list	Relatively open:	D'Hondt method	—		Parliamentary system	135 constituency seats, 40 leveling seats
Dominican Republic	Chamber of Deputies	Lower house of national legislature	Party-list PR	Closed list	—	D'Hondt method	—	Departments	Presidential republic	
Ecuador	National Congress	Unicameral national legislature	Party-list PR	Closed list	—	Sainte-Laguë method	—	Departments	Presidential republic	
El Salvador	Legislative Assembly	Unicameral national legislature	Party-list PR	Open list	Panachage	D'Hondt method	—	Departments	Presidential republic	
Equatorial Guinea	Chamber of Deputies	Lower house of national legislature	Party-list PR	Closed list	—	D'Hondt method	10%	Districts	Presidential republic	
Estonia	Riigikogu	Unicameral national legislature	Party-list PR	Open list		D'Hondt method	5%	Electoral districts	Parliamentary system	
European Union	European Parliament	Lower house of supranational legislature	Party-list PR in 25 member states	Open list in 19 countries	—	Varies by Country	<5%	None (votes are tallied in a single nationwide constituency for all states except Belgium, Ireland, Italy and Poland). Constituencies in Belgium, Ireland, Italy and Poland.		
European Union	European Parliament	Lower house of supranational legislature	Party-list PR in 25 member states	Closed list (Germany, France, Portugal, Spain, Hungary, Romania)	—	Varies by Country	<5%	None (votes are tallied in a single nationwide constituency for all states except Belgium, Ireland, Italy and Poland). Constituencies in Belgium, Ireland, Italy and Poland.		
European Union	European Parliament	Lower house of supranational legislature	Single transferable vote in Ireland and Malta	—	—	Varies by Country	—	None (votes are tallied in a single nationwide constituency for all states except Belgium, Ireland, Italy and Poland). Constituencies in Belgium, Ireland, Italy and Poland.		
Faroe Islands	Løgting	Unicameral national legislature	Party-list PR	Open list	—	D'Hondt method	3.03%	None (votes are tallied in a single nationwide constituency)	Parliamentary republic	
Fiji	Parliament	Unicameral national legislature	Party-list PR	Open list	—	D'Hondt method	5%	None (votes are tallied in a single nationwide constituency)	Parliamentary republic	
Finland	Parliament (Eduskunta)	Unicameral national legislature	Party-list PR	Open list	—	D'Hondt method	None	Electoral districts	Parliamentary republic	
Germany	Federal Diet (Bundestag)	Lower house of national legislature	Localised PR with 2 votes	FPTP (constituency) + Closed list (regional)	—	Sainte-Laguë method	5% nationally (list vote) or plurality in 3 seats (candidate vote)	Electoral district and states	Federal parliamentary republic	299 seats can be elected from the party's first-placed candidates in single-member constituencies, if the party has sufficient coverage in the proportional vote
Greenland	Inatsisartut	Unicameral national legislature	Party-list PR	Open list	—	D'Hondt method	—	None (votes are tallied in a single nationwide constituency)	Parliamentary republic	
Guatemala	Congress of the Republic	Unicameral national legislature	Party-list PR	Closed list	—	D'Hondt method	—	Departments	Presidential republic	
Guinea-Bissau	National People's Assembly	Unicameral national legislature	Party-list PR	Closed list	—	D'Hondt method	—	Electoral districts	Semi-presidential republic	
Guyana	National Assembly	Unicameral national legislature	Party-list PR	Closed list	—	Hare quota + largest remainders	—	None (votes are tallied in a single nationwide constituency)	Parliamentary republic with an executive president	
Guyana	National Assembly	Unicameral national legislature	Party-list PR	Closed list	—	Hare quota + largest remainders	—	Regions	Parliamentary republic with an executive president	
Honduras	National Congress	Unicameral national legislature	Party-list PR	Open list	Fully open with panachage (free lists)	Hare quota	—	Departments	Presidential republic	
Iceland	Althing	Unicameral national legislature	Party-list PR	Open list	—	D'Hondt method	5%	Constituency	Parliamentary republic	
Indonesia	House of Representatives	Lower house of national legislature	Party-list PR	Open list	—	Sainte-Laguë method	4%	Constituency (electoral districts: groups of regencies and cities in Indonesian provinces)	Unitary presidential constitutional republic	
Ireland	Dáil Éireann	Lower house of national legislature	Single transferable vote in districts with 3–5 members	—	—	Droop quota	—	Constituencies	Unitary parliamentary republic	
Israel	Knesset	Unicameral national legislature	Party-list PR	Closed list	—	D'Hondt method	3.25%	None (votes are tallied in a single nationwide constituency)	Unitary parliamentary republic	
Kosovo	Assembly of the Republic	Unicameral national legislature	Party-list PR	Open list	—	Sainte-Laguë method	5%	None (votes are tallied in a single nationwide constituency)	Unitary parliamentary republic	
Latvia	Saeima	Unicameral national legislature	Party-list PR	Open list	Most open	Sainte-Laguë method	5%	5 multi-member constituencies consisting of municipalities	Parliamentary republic	
Lebanon	Parilament	Unicameral national legislature	Party-list PR	Open list	—	D'Hondt method	—	Communities	Unitary parliamentary republic	
Lesotho	National Assembly	Unicameral national legislature	Mixed-member PR	Open list	—	Hare quota	—	None (votes are tallied in a single nationwide constituency)	Unitary parliamentary republic	Variant using a mixed single vote
Liechtenstein	Landtag	Unicameral national legislature	Party-list PR	Open list	—	D'Hondt method	8%	Constituencies (electoral districts)	Parliamentary system	
Luxembourg	Chamber of Deputies	Unicameral national legislature	Party-list PR	Open list	Fully open with panachage (free lists)		—	Constituencies	Parliamentary system	
Macedonia	Assembly	Unicameral national legislature	Party-list PR	Closed list	—	D'Hondt method	—	Regions	Parliamentary system	
Malta	Parilament	Unicameral national legislature	Single transferable vote in 5-seat districts	—	—	Droop quota	—	None (votes are tallied in a single nationwide constituency)	Parliamentary system	
Moldova	Parilament	Unicameral national legislature	Party-list PR	Closed list	—	D'Hondt method	5%	None (votes are tallied in a single nationwide constituency)	Unitary parliamentary republic	
Montenegro	Parilament	Unicameral national legislature	Party-list PR	Closed list	—	D'Hondt method	3%	None (votes are tallied in a single nationwide constituency)	Parliamentary system	
Mozambique	Assembly of the Republic	Unicameral national legislature	Party-list PR	Closed list	—	D'Hondt method	5%	Provinces	Presidential republic	
Namibia	National Assembly	Lower house of national legislature	Party-list PR	Closed list	—	D'Hondt method	—	None (votes are tallied in a single nationwide constituency)	Presidential republic	
Netherlands	House of Representatives	Lower house of national legislature	Party-list PR	Open list	More open: 25% of the quota for one seat (0.167%)	D'Hondt method	0.667% (1/150)	None (votes are tallied in a single nationwide constituency)	Parliamentary system	
New Zealand	House of Representatives	Unicameral national legislature	Mixed-member PR	Closed list	—	Sainte-Laguë method	5% or 1 district won	None (votes are tallied in a single nationwide constituency)	Parliamentary system	
Norway	Storting	Unicameral national legislature	Party-list PR	Open list	—	Sainte-Laguë method	4%	Constituencies	Parliamentary system	
Palestine	Legislative Council	Unicameral national legislature	Party-list PR	Open list	—	Sainte-Laguë method	3%	None (votes are tallied in a single nationwide constituency)	Presidential republic	
Paraguay	Chamber of Deputies	Lower house of national legislature	Party-list PR	Closed list	—	D'Hondt method	—	Departments	Presidential republic	
Paraguay	Senate	Upper house of national legislature	Party-list PR	Closed list	—	D'Hondt method	—	Departments	Presidential republic	
Peru	Congress	Unicameral national legislature	Party-list PR	Open list	—	D'Hondt method	5%	Departments	Presidential republic	
Poland	Sejm	Lower house of national legislature	Party-list PR	Open list	—	D'Hondt method	5% threshold or more for single parties, 8% or more for coalitions or 0% or more for minorities	Constituencies	Semi-presidential republic	
Portugal	Assembly of the Republic (Portugal)	Unicameral national legislature	Party-list PR	Closed list	—	D'Hondt method	—	Districts of Portugal	Semi-presidential republic	
Romania	Chamber of Deputies	Lower house of national legislature	Party-list PR	Closed list	—	D'Hondt method	5%	Counties	Presidential republic	
Romania	Senate	Upper house of national legislature	Party-list PR	Closed list	—	D'Hondt method	5%	Counties	Presidential republic	
Rwanda	Chamber of Deputies	Unicameral national legislature	Party-list PR	Closed list	—	Largest remainder method (? quota)	5%	None (single nationwide constituency)	Presidential republic	
San Marino	Grand and General Council	Unicameral national legislature	Party-list PR with contingent majority jackpot runoff	Open list	—	D'Hondt method	3.5%	None (single nationwide constituency)	Parliamentary system	If needed to ensure a stable majority, the two best-placed parties participate in a run-off vote to receive a majority bonus.
São Tomé and Príncipe	National Assembly	Unicameral national legislature	Party-list PR	Closed list	—	D'Hondt method	—	Districts	Semi-presidential republic	
Sierra Leone	Parliament of Sierra Leone	Unicameral national legislature	Party-list PR	Closed list	—	Hare quota	—	Districts	Presidential republic	
Serbia	National Assembly	Unicameral national legislature	Party-list PR	Closed list	—	D'Hondt method	3%	None (single nationwide constituency)	Parliamentary system	
Sint Maarten	Parilament	Unicameral national legislature	Party-list PR	Open list	—	Hare quota	—	None (single nationwide constituency)	Parliamentary system	
Slovakia	National Council	Unicameral national legislature	Party-list PR	Open list	—	Droop quota and largest remainders	5%	None (single nationwide constituency)	Parliamentary system	
Slovenia	National Assembly	Lower house of national legislature	Party-list PR	Open list	Fully open	Droop quota	4%	Constituencies (electoral districts)	Parliamentary system	All 8 constituencies have 11 seats.
Slovenia	National Assembly	Lower house of national legislature	Party-list PR	Open list	Fully open	d'Hondt method	4%	Constituencies (electoral districts)	Parliamentary system	All 8 constituencies have 11 seats.
South Africa	National Assembly	Lower house of national legislature	Party-list PR	Closed list at large	—	Droop quota and largest remainders	—	Nationwide at Large	Parliamentary republic with an executive president	
South Africa	National Assembly	Lower house of national legislature	Party-list PR	Closed list	—	Droop quota and largest remainders	—	Regions	Parliamentary republic with an executive president	
Spain	Congress of Deputies	Lower house of national legislature	Party-list PR	Closed list	—	D'Hondt method	3%	Provinces of Spain	Parliamentary system	
Sri Lanka	Parliament	Unicameral national legislature	Party-list PR	Open list (district lists elect 196/225 seats)	Panachage (up to 3 preference votes)	Hare quota	5% (per constituency)	Constituencies (electoral districts)	Semi-presidential system	
Sri Lanka	Parliament	Unicameral national legislature	Party-list PR	Closed list (national list to elect 29/225 seats)	—	Hare quota	No threshold	None (single nationwide constituency)	Semi-presidential system	
Suriname	National Assembly	Unicameral national legislature	Party-list PR	Open list	Fully open	D'Hondt method	No threshold	Districts of Suriname	Assembly-independent republic	
Sweden	Riksdag	Unicameral national legislature	Party-list PR	Open list	More open (5% of the party vote to override the default party-list)	Sainte-Laguë method	4% nationally or 12% in a given constituency	Counties of Sweden (some counties are further subdivided)	Parliamentary system	Leveling seats
Switzerland	National Council	Lower house of national legislature	Party-list PR	Open list	Fully open with panachage (free lists)	Hagenbach-Bischoff system	No threshold	Cantons of Switzerland	Semi-direct democracy under an assembly-independent directorial republic	
Switzerland	Council of States (only to elect councillors in: Jura; Neuchâtel)	Upper house of national legislature	Party-list PR	Open list	Fully open	?	No threshold	None (single cantonwide constituency)	Semi-direct democracy under an assembly-independent directorial republic	
Timor-Leste	National Parliament	Unicameral national legislature	Party-list PR	Closed listop	—	D'Hondt method	3%	None (single nationwide constituency)		
Togo	National Assembly	Lower house of national legislature	Party-list PR	Closed list	—	Highest averages method (?)	No threshold	Constituencies	Presidential system	
Tunisia	Assembly of the Representatives of the People	Lower house of national legislature	Party-list PR	Closed list	—	Largest remainder method (? quota)	No threshold	Constituencies	Semi-presidential system	
Turkey	Grand National Assembly	Unicameral national legislature	Party-list PR	Closed list	—	D'Hondt method	7%	Provinces of Turkey (some provinces are further subdivided)	Presidential system	
Uruguay	Chamber of Representatives	Lower house of national legislature	Party-list PR	Closed list	—	D'Hondt method	No threshold	Departments of Uruguay	Presidential system	Ballots use the double simultaneous vote, the same ballot is used for electing the president (first round) and the two chambers
Uruguay	Chamber of Senators	Upper house of national legislature	Party-list PR	Closed list	—	D'Hondt method	No threshold	None (single nationwide constituency)	Presidential system	Ballots use the double simultaneous vote, the same ballot is used for electing the president (first round) and the two chambers

=== Former use ===
- France (1945-1958)
- Hungary (1945-1947): closed list PR
- Italy (1948-1993): open list PR
- Russia (2007-2011)
- Thailand (2019): single-vote MMP
- Venezuela (until 2009): MMP

== Incentives for choosing an electoral system ==
Changing the electoral system requires the agreement of a majority of the currently selected legislators, who were chosen using the incumbent electoral system. Therefore, an interesting question is what incentives make current legislators support a new electoral system, particularly a PR system.

Many political scientists argue that PR was adopted by parties on the right as a strategy to survive amid suffrage expansion, democratization and the rise of workers' parties. According to Stein Rokkan in a seminal 1970 study, parties on the right opted to adopt PR as a way to survive as competitive parties in situations when the parties on the right were not united enough to exist under majoritarian systems. This argument was formalized and supported by Carles Boix in a 1999 study. Amel Ahmed noted that, prior to the adoption of PR, many electoral systems were based on majority or plurality rule, and that these systems risked eradicating parties on the right in areas where the working class was large in numbers. He therefore argues that parties on the right adopted PR as a way to ensure that they would survive as potent political forces amid suffrage expansion. A 2021 study linked the adoption of PR to incumbent fears of revolutionary threats.

In contrast, other scholars argue that the choice to adopt PR was also due to a demand by parties on the left to ensure a foothold in politics, as well as to encourage a consensual system that would help the left realize its preferred economic policies. The pressure to change may become so great that the government feels it must give in to the demand, even if it itself does not benefit from the change. This is the same process by which women's suffrage was achieved in many countries.

== See also ==
- Condorcet paradox
- Direct representation
- Interactive representation
- Justified representation, a generalization of the principle of proportionality to multiwinner approval voting.
- One person, one vote
- Proportional representation in the United Kingdom
- Proportional representation in the United States
