= Indirect election =

Type of election

An indirect election or hierarchical voting, is an election in which voters do not choose directly among candidates or parties for an office, but elect people who in turn choose candidates or parties. This electoral system is one of the oldest forms of elections and is used by many countries for heads of state (such as presidents), heads of government (such as prime ministers), and/or upper houses. It is also used for some supranational legislatures. The body that controls the federal executive branch (such as a cabinet) is in many countries elected indirectly by the head of government with exception of some directorial systems. Upper houses, especially in federal republics, are often indirectly elected, either by the corresponding lower house or cabinet.

Positions that are indirectly elected may be chosen by a permanent body (such as a parliament) or by a special body convened solely for that purpose (such as an electoral college). An election can be partially indirect, for example in the case of indirect single transferable voting, where only eliminated candidates select other candidates to transfer their vote share to. Similarly, supranational legislatures can be indirectly elected by constituent countries' legislatures or executive governments.

== Heads of state ==
A head of state is the official leader and representative of a country. The head of state position can vary from ceremonial figurehead with limited power to powerful leader depending on the government structure and historical legacy of the country. For instance, in some cases heads of state inherit the position through a monarchy whereas others are indirectly or directly elected such as presidents. Several examples are included below.

=== United States ===
The President of the United States is elected indirectly. In a US presidential election, eligible members of the public vote for the electors of an Electoral College, who have previously pledged publicly to support a particular presidential candidate. When the Electoral College sits, soon after the election, it formally elects the candidate that has won a majority of the members of the Electoral College. Members of the federal cabinet, including the vice president, are in practice nominated by the president, and are thus elected indirectly. The Electoral College is a controversial issue in U.S. politics, especially following presidential elections when voting is polarized geographically in such a way that the electoral college elects a candidate who did not win an absolute majority of the popular vote. The National Popular Vote Interstate Compact, if enacted, would effectively replace the indirect election via the Electoral College with a de facto plurality-based direct election.

=== China ===
The Constitution of China specifies a system of indirect democracy. The National People's Congress elects the president, also known as the state chairman, who serves as state representative. The National People's Congress of China is elected by lower levels of the system of people's congress.

=== European Union ===
The president of the European Commission is nominated by the European Council and confirmed or denied by the directly elected European Parliament (see Elections to the European Parliament). The European Council contains both directly elected and indirectly elected heads of state or government of member states.

=== Parliamentary systems ===
Republics with parliamentary systems often elect their head of state indirectly (e.g. Germany, Italy, India, Israel). Several parliamentary republics, such as Ireland, Austria, Croatia, Bulgaria and the Czech Republic, have directly elected president distinct from the prime minister, without operating as semi-presidential in practice.

=== Brazil ===
The Federal Constitution mandates that the President of the Republic and other high-ranking federal and state officials be elected directly, but there are constitutional provisions allowing for indirect election of executive officers in exceptional cases. In the event of a simultaneous vacancy in the offices of President and Vice-President of the Republic, provided this occurs during the second half of the term, it falls to the National Congress to elect their replacements to complete the presidential term.

Although simultaneous vacancies have not occurred at the federal level under the current constitutional order, they are common at the state level. There is no constitutional requirement for the separate direct or indirect election of a Vice President or Vice Governor in the event of a vacancy.

== Government ==
A head of government is in charge of the daily business of government and overseeing central government institutions. In presidential systems the president is the head of government and head of state. In parliamentary systems the head of government is usually the leader of the party with the most seats in the legislature. Several examples of heads of government who are chosen through indirect elections are summarized below.

=== Prime minister ===
The most prominent position in parliamentary democracies is the prime ministership.

Under the Westminster system, named after and typified by the parliament of the United Kingdom, a prime minister (or first minister, premier, or chief minister) is the person that can command the largest coalition of supporters in parliament. In almost all cases, the prime minister is the leader of a political party (or coalition) that has a majority in the parliament, or the lower house (such as the House of Commons), or in the situation that no one party has a majority then the largest party or a coalition of smaller parties may attempt to form a minority government. The prime minister is thus indirectly elected as political parties elect their own leader through internal democratic process, while the general public choose from amongst the local candidates of the various political parties or independents.

The Westminster model continues to be used in a number of Commonwealth countries including Australia, Canada, New Zealand, Singapore and the United Kingdom. Additionally many nations colonized by the British Empire inherited the Westminster model following their independence.

In Spain, the Congress of Deputies votes on a motion of confidence of the king's nominee (customarily the party leader whose party controls the Congress) and the nominee's political manifesto, an example of an indirect election of the prime minister of Spain.

=== Federal Chancellor ===
In Germany, the federal chancellor - the most powerful position on the federal level - is elected indirectly by the Bundestag, which in turn is elected by the population. The federal president, the head of state, proposes candidates for the chancellor's office. Although this has never happened, the Bundestag may in theory also choose to elect another person into office, which the president has to accept.

=== Appointment ===
Some countries have nonpartisan heads of government who are appointed by the president, such as the Prime Minister of Singapore.

== Upper houses ==
Members of the German Bundesrat are appointed (delegated) by the Landtag of the various states.

In France, election to the upper house of Parliament, the Sénat, is indirect. Electors (called "Grands électeurs") are locally elected representatives

In the Netherlands the Senate is elected by the members of the States Provincial and of the Electoral colleges for the Caribbean Netherlands and for Dutch citizens living abroad. Each vote is weighted in a way that the total vote weight of a province or special municipality is proportional to its population, while the total vote weight of the electoral college for Dutch citizens living abroad is set proportional to the number of voters registered to vote in its election.

Members of the Indian Rajya Sabha (upper house of parliament) are largely elected directly by the Vidhan Sabha (legislative assembly) of the various states and Union territories; some are appointed by the president.

Indirect single transferable voting is used to elect some members of the Senate of Pakistan.

== Legislatures ==
=== China ===
The system of people's congress contains currently 5 levels with higher levels including National People's Congress elected indirectly.

=== Supranational ===
Some examples of indirectly elected supranational legislatures include: the parliamentary assemblies of the Council of Europe, OSCE and NATO – in all of these cases, voters elect national parliamentarians, who in turn elect some of their own members to the assembly. The same applies to bodies formed by representatives chosen by a national government, e.g. the United Nations General Assembly – assuming the national governments in question are democratically elected in the first place.

== Historical ==
=== Brazil ===
At various points in brazilian political history, high-ranking officers were elected indirectly. Some of these indirect elections were exceptional in nature, as direct election was the norm.

==== First Republic ====
The first republican constitution, in 1891, stipulated that the first President and Vice-President of the Republic would be elected by the Constituent Congress, to be succeeded by officeholders elected directly by the people. Marshal Deodoro da Fonseca, then Head of the Provisional Government, was elected the first President of the Republic on February 25, 1891, the day after the promulgation of the Constitution. In the same day, separately, Marshal Floriano Peixoto was elected the first Vice President of the Republic.

==== Vargas Era ====
The 1934 Constitution, like the previous one, also stipulated that the new President for the subsequent term would be elected by the National Constituent Assembly, with subsequent officeholders to be elected by the people. Getúlio Vargas, then Head of the Provisional Government, was elected President of the Republic for a term that would end in 1938. Additionally, this Constitution stipulated that the new governors and members of the Federal Senate would be elected by their respective state constituent assemblies.

The 1938 Constitution, enacted by President Getúlio Vargas, provided for a National Parliament composed of a Federal Council and the Chamber of Deputies. This Federal Council, with limited powers, would replace the Federal Senate and consist of members elected by the state legislative assemblies. Subsequently, a constitutional law added a representative from the Federal District to its composition. However, throughout the Vargas Era, no elections for the legislature were held.

==== Late Fourth Republic ====
During the Fourth Republic, some provisions of the 1946 Constitution providing for the direct election of the President of the Republic were superseded by the Additional Act that established a parliamentary system. Under the new institutional arrangement, the President of the Republic would be elected by an absolute majority of the members of the National Congress for a five-year term. The short nature of the parliamentary system meant that the indirect election did not take place. Then Vice President João Goulart became President following the resignation of Jânio Quadros, due to another non-related constitutional provision.

==== Military Dictatorship ====
Following the 1964 coup d'état, Institutional Act No. 2 established indirect elections for the presidency and state governors by an absolute majority of the members of the National Congress and of the state legislative assemblies, respectively. Subsequently, the 1967 Constitution formalized indirect presidential elections via an Electoral College of members of the National Congress and delegates appointed by state legislative assemblies. A constitutional amendment in 1977 mandated that one-third of the senators and the governors be elected by electoral colleges composed of members of the legislative assemblies and delegates from the municipal councils of the respective state.

=== China (1912-1949) ===
The Control Yuan of China, formerly a parliamentary chamber, was elected by its respective legislatures across the country: five from each province, two from each directly administered municipality, eight from Mongolia (by 1948 only the Inner Mongolian provinces were represented), eight from Tibet and eight from the overseas Chinese communities. As originally envisioned both the President and Vice President of the Control Yuan were to be elected by and from the members like the speaker of many other parliamentary bodies worldwide. The Control Yuan became a sole auditory body in Taiwan in 1993 after democratization.

=== United States ===
Members of the United States Senate were elected by the Legislature of the various states until ratification of the Seventeenth Amendment to the United States Constitution in 1913. Since that time they have been elected by direct popular vote.

== Accountability ==
Indirect elections can have a lower political accountability and responsiveness compared to direct elections.

== See also ==
- Democratic deficit
- Double direct election
- List of democracy and elections-related topics
- Multi-level governance
- Partisan primary
- Proxy voting
- Liquid democracy
