= Gallagher index =

Measure of electoral disproportionality

Map of Gallagher index for latest election as of June 2025: 0-1 1-3 3-5 5-7 / 7-9 9-11 11-13 13-15 / 15-20 20+ No data

The Gallagher index measures an electoral system's relative disproportionality between votes received and seats in a legislature. As such, it measures the difference between the percentage of votes each party gets and the percentage of seats each party gets in the resulting legislature, and it also measures this disproportionality from all parties collectively in any one given election. That collective disproportionality from the election is given a precise score, which can then be used in comparing various levels of proportionality among various elections from various electoral systems. The Gallagher index is a statistical analysis methodology utilised within political science, notably the branch of psephology.

Michael Gallagher, who created the index, referred to it as a "least squares index", inspired by the sum of squares of residuals used in the method of least squares. The index is therefore commonly abbreviated as "LSq" even though the measured allocation is not necessarily a least squares fit. The Gallagher index is computed by taking the square root of half the sum of the squares of the difference between percent of votes ($V_i$) and percent of seats ($S_i$) for each of the political parties ($i=1,\ldots,n$).

$\mathrm{LSq} = \sqrt{ \frac{1}{2} \sum_{i=1}^n ( V_i-S_i ) ^2}$

The division by 2 gives an index whose values range between 0 and 100. The larger the differences between the percentage of the votes and the percentage of seats summed over all parties, the larger the Gallagher index. The larger the index value the larger the disproportionality and vice versa. Michael Gallagher included "other" parties as a whole category, and Arend Lijphart modified it, excluding those parties. Compared to the Loosemore–Hanby index, the Gallagher index is more sensitive to large discrepancies. Other indices measuring the proportionality between seat share and party vote share are the Loosemore–Hanby index, Rae index, and the Sainte-Laguë Index.

Comparison of Gallagher indices of various countries since 1945

== History ==
The first publication of the use of least squares in measuring the dis-proportionality of election outcomes was by Michael Gallagher in 1991 in which he writes: "These [election] indices were originally outlined in Markku Laakso and Rein Taagepera, '"Effective" number of parties: a measure with application to west Europe', Comparative Political Studies 12:1 (1979), pp. 3–27 (effective number of parties), and Michael Gallagher, 'Proportionality, disproportionality and electoral systems', Electoral Studies 10:1 (1991), pp. 33–51 (least squares index)."

== Application in Canada ==
The Gallagher index gained considerable attention in Canada in December 2016 in the context of efforts to reform Canada's electoral system. The Special Committee on Electoral Reform (a Parliamentary Committee) recommended "that the Government should, as it develops a new electoral system, use the Gallagher index in order to minimize the level of distortion between the popular will of the electorate and the resultant seat allocations in Parliament." The committee recommended that "the government should seek to design a system that achieves a Gallagher score of 5 or less."

== Examples of calculating disproportionality ==
=== Canada ===
In the 2015 Canadian federal election, the Gallagher index was 12.02, where 0 would be a perfectly proportional election outcome.

Gallagher Index for the 2015 Canadian federal election
Party	Votes (%)	Seats (%)	Difference	Difference squared
Liberal	39.47%	54.44%	14.97	224.1009
Conservatives	31.89%	29.29%	-2.6	6.76
New Democratic	19.71%	13.02%	-6.69	44.7561
Bloc Québecois	4.66%	2.96%	-1.7	2.89
Green	3.45%	0.29%	-3.16	9.9856
Other	0.82%	0.00%	-0.82	0.6724
Total of differences squared				289.165
Total / 2				144.5825
Square root of (Total / 2): Gallagher Index result				12.02

=== Australia ===
This table uses for example the 2012 Queensland state election, one of the largest landslides in Australian electoral history. Though Australia and New Zealand have somewhat similar political histories, Australia uses preferential voting in Single-member districts for Commonwealth House of Representative and most state and territory Legislative Assembly elections, which tends to result in far less proportionality compared to New Zealand's MMP system (or other proportional electoral systems), especially for larger minor parties, such as The Greens or, historically, the Australian Democrats. The 2012 Queensland election had an extremely high Gallagher Index, at 31.16, due to the massive landslide in seats for the victorious LNP. The LNP gained 88% of the seats with less than 50% of the vote. Most recent Australian state and federal elections however score between 10 and 12.

Gallagher Index for the 2012 Queensland state election
Party	Votes (%)	Seats (%)	Difference	Difference squared
Liberal National	49.65%	87.64%	37.99	1443.2401
Labor	26.66%	7.87%	-18.79	353.0641
Katter	11.53%	2.25%	-9.28	86.1184
Greens	7.53%	0.00%	-7.53	56.7009
Other	1.47%	0.00%	-1.47	2.1609
Independent	3.16%	2.25%	-0.91	0.8281
Total of differences squared				1942.1125
Total / 2				971.0563
Square root of (Total / 2): Gallagher Index result				31.16

=== EU ===
The 7 political groups of the European Parliament instead of the 203 political parties allow a concise calculation of disproportionality between votes and seats. The Gallagher index for the European Parliament is 7.87.

Gallagher Index for the 2019 European Parliament election
Party	Votes (%)	Seats (%)	Difference	Difference squared
EPP	20.80%	24.23%	3.43	11.7649
S&D	17.88%	20.51%	2.63	6.9169
RE	12.01%	14.38%	2.37	5.6169
G/EFA	10.04%	9.85%	-0.19	0.0361
ID	10.59%	9.72%	-0.87	0.7569
ECR	7.17%	8.26%	1.09	1.1881
GUE/NGL	5.16%	5.46%	0.3	0.09
NI	6.52%	7.59%	1.07	1.1449
Wasted vote	9.82%	0.00%	-9.82	96.4324
Total of differences squared				123.9471
Total / 2				61.9736
Square root of (Total / 2): Gallagher Index result				7.87

=== Sweden ===
The disproportionality of the 2022 Swedish general election was 0.64 according to the Gallagher index, which is extremely low by international standards (resulting in almost perfectly proportional seat allocations), due to Sweden's use of the modified Sainte-Laguë method in elections to the Riksdag.

=== Republic of Ireland ===
The disproportionality of the 2020 Irish general election was 1.96 according to the Gallagher index. The Republic of Ireland uses the single transferable vote (STV) system with Droop quota in elections to the Dáil Éireann.

=== United States ===
This table uses the aggregate results of the 2012 elections to the United States House of Representatives. These 435 single-seat elections are winner-take-all, which would tend to create disproportionate results, but this is moderated by the extremely high share of votes obtained by the two major parties—more than 96%, likely in part caused by fears of wasted votes and vote splitting. The Gallagher index ignores the effect of the primaries on the proportionality.

Gallagher Index for the 2012 United States House of Representatives elections
Party	Votes (%)	Seats (%)	Difference	Difference squared
Republican Party	47.66%	53.80%	6.14	37.6996
Democratic Party	48.77%	44.20%	-4.57	20.8849
Libertarian Party	1.11%	0.00%	-1.11	1.2321
Independents and minor parties	1.01%	0.00%	-1.01	1.0201
Green Party	0.31%	0.00%	-0.31	0.0961
Others	1.13%	0.00%	-1.13	1.2769
Total of differences squared				62.2097
Total / 2				31.1049
Square root of (Total / 2): Gallagher Index result				5.58

=== United Kingdom ===
The 2024 general election in the United Kingdom was the most disproportional in modern British history. The Liberal Democrats recorded their best ever seat result (72), despite receiving only around half the votes they did in 2010, and fewer votes overall than Reform, although the party's seat share was again lower than its share of the vote. Advocacy group Make Votes Matter found that 58% of voters did not vote for their elected MP. Make Votes Matter spokesman Steve Gilmore, Electoral Reform Society chief Darren Hughes, Reform UK leader Nigel Farage and the Green Party of England and Wales co-leader Adrian Ramsay were among the figures that called for electoral reform in the wake of the election. The campaigners said it was the "most disproportionate election in [British] history".

Gallagher Index for the 2024 United Kingdom general election
Party	Votes (%)	Seats (%)	Difference	Difference squared
Labour	33.70%	63.23%	29.53	872.0209
Conservative	23.70%	18.62%	-5.08	25.8064
Reform UK	14.29%	0.77%	-13.52	182.7904
Liberal Democrats	12.22%	11.08%	-1.14	1.2996
Green	6.39%	0.46%	-5.93	35.1649
Independents	1.96%	0.92%	-1.04	1.0816
Others	7.74%	4.92%	-2.82	7.9524
Total of differences squared				1126.1162
Total / 2				563.0581
Square root of (Total / 2): Gallagher Index result				23.73

== Countries ==
Gallagher indices for individual countries. Only the last available index for each country is shown.
Country	Year	Gallagher Index
Albania	2025	5.52
Algeria	2026	7.05
Andorra	2023	16.47
Angola	2022	4.32
Anguilla	2025	21.05
Antigua and Barbuda	2026	29.66
Argentina	2023	5.14
Armenia	2026	9.46
Aruba	2024	10.25
Australia	2025	23.11
Austria	2024	3.21
Bahamas	2026	25.07
Barbados	2022	28.92
Belgium	2024	3.83
Belize	2025	14.37
Benin	2023	9.08
Bermuda	2025	14.95
Bhutan	2023-24	24.70
Bolivia	2020	2.60
Bosnia and Herzegovina	2026	3.93
Botswana	2024	23.03
Brazil	2022	3.53
Bulgaria	2026	9.46
Burkina Faso	2020	8.16
Cabo Verde	2026	3.27
Canada	2025	5.01
Cayman Islands	2025	9.28
Chile	2021	9.58
Colombia	2022	4.60
Cook Islands	2026	20.86
Costa Rica	2022	8.26
Croatia	2024	7.04
Curaçao	2025	6.31
Cyprus	2021	6.44
Czech Republic	2021	10.34
Denmark (Note: The 175 seats of Denmark "proper")	2026	0.42
Kingdom of Denmark (Note: Includes the 179 seats for Denmark, Greenland, and the Faroe Islands)	2026	0.72
Dominica	2022	6.55
Dominican Republic	2020	7.32
El Salvador	2024	15.02
Estonia	2023	4.66
EU	2019	7.87
Faroe Islands	2026	1.16
Fiji	2022	4.75
Finland	2023	3.99
France	2024	7.79
Gambia	2022	7.93
Georgia	2024	4.93
Germany	2025	6.49
Ghana	2024	13.03
Gibraltar	2023	2.54
Greece	2023	8.97
Greenland	2025	2.44
Grenada	2026	31.30
Guatemala	2023	8.85
Guinea	2020	2.14
Guinea-Bissau	2023	10.81
Guyana	2025	0.88
Honduras	2021	6.41
Hungary	2022	11.76
Iceland	2024	5.31
India	2024	6.98
Indonesia	2024	4.86
Ireland	2024	5.77
Israel	2026	2.98
Italy	2022	12.37
Jamaica	2025	4.87
Japan	2026	23.62
Kosovo	2026	3.28
Latvia	2026	7.11
Lesotho	2022	6.03
Liberia	2023	10.13
Liechtenstein	2025	2.45
Lithuania	2024	13.58
Luxembourg	2023	5.96
Malawi	2019	8.56
Malaysia	2022	8.03
Malta	2022	2.24
Mauritius	2024	27.42
Mexico	2024	15.58
Moldova	2021	8.44
Monaco	2023	10.37
Mongolia	2024	12.84
Montenegro	2023	4.93
Morocco	2021	4.18
Mozambique	2024	4.37
Namibia	2024	1.06
Nepal	2022	6.02
Netherlands	2025	0.98
New Zealand	2023	2.63
Niger	2020-21	8.10
Nicaragua	2021	7.72
North Cyprus	2022	7.78
North Macedonia	2024	3.42
Northern Ireland	2022	7.80
Norway	2021	3.65
Pakistan	2024	11.41
Panama	2024	9.77
Paraguay	2023	9.53
Peru	2021	14.02
Poland	2023	6.46
Portugal	2025	5.46
Romania	2024	4.66
Russia	2021	16.96
Saint Kitts and Nevis	2022	15.97
Saint Lucia	2025	30.22
Saint Vincent and the Grenadines	2020	10.37
San Marino	2024	3.88
Sao Tome and Principe	2026	8.04
Scotland	2026	13.71
Senegal	2024	17.86
Serbia	2026	2.66
Seychelles	2020	15.33
Sierra Leone	2023	2.44
Singapore	2025	16.88
Sint Maarten	2024 August	6.35
Slovakia	2023	7.44
Slovenia	2022	11.49
South Africa	2024	0.71
South Korea	2024	15.27
Spain	2023	5.67
Sri Lanka	2024	6.93
Suriname	2025	1.67
Sweden	2022	0.64
Switzerland	2023	3.60
Taiwan	2024	8.19
Thailand	2026	17.60
Timor-Leste	2023	6.06
Trinidad and Tobago	2025	8.09
Turkey	2023	3.61
Turks and Caicos Islands	2025	26.41
Uganda	2021	14.90
United Kingdom	2024	23.64
United States	2024 House	1.01
United States	2024 Electoral college	7.29
Uruguay	2024	2.14
Vanuatu	2025	8.58
Venezuela	2025	5.5
Wales	2026	9.36
Zambia	2021	5.21

== See also ==
- Democracy indices
- Efficiency gap
