= Sainte-Laguë Index =

Measure of electoral disproportionality

The Sainte-Laguë index (SLI) measures an election’s disproportionality, the adherence to the one person, one vote principle of equal representation. This index assumes if the fraction of voters matches the fraction of seats, then perfect proportionality is achieved.

Equation for Sainte-Laguë index:

$$\mathrm{SLI} = \sum_{i=1}^n {V_i*(S_i/V_i-1)^2}=\sum_{i=1}^n {(S_i-V_i)^2 \over V_i}$$,

where $V_i$ is fraction of votes and $S_i$ is fraction of seats for each of the political parties. The first part of the equation illustrates the derivation of the equation as the squared difference to the ideal seats-to-votes ratio, then weighted equally for each voter.

The larger the Sainte-Laguë index is, the larger the disproportionality and the smaller the Sainte-Laguë index is, the more proportional the election.

Michael Gallagher stated that the Sainte-Laguë index (SLI) constructed from and minimized by the Sainte-Laguë method is "at the theoretical level is probably the soundest of all the measures." The Sainte-Laguë index is closely related to the Pearson's chi-squared test, which some argue gives it better statistical underpinning than the Gallagher index.

The Sainte-Laguë index, as other proportionality indices, is used in psephology to compare the proportionality between various elections from various electoral systems and countries. The relationship among Sainte-Laguë index and the other indices varies depending if the election disproportionality affects smaller or larger parties more.

== See also ==
- Efficiency gap
- Wasted vote
