= Unitary parliamentary republic =

Form of government

A unitary parliamentary republic is a type of unitary state and a parliamentary republic. They are governed as a single entity in which the central government is the supreme authority with a republican form of government in which political authority is entrusted to the parliament by multiple electoral districts throughout a country. In this system, voters elect members of parliament, who then make legislative decisions on behalf of their constituents.

The legislature in a parliamentary republic may consist of one or more separate assemblies, houses, or chambers. This distinction is called a cameral structure and according to it, a republic may be unicameral (just a single assembly), bicameral (two assemblies), or tricameral (three assemblies).

== List of unitary parliamentary republics ==
Country	Formerly	Parliamentary republic adopted	Head of state elected by	Cameral structure
Albania	One-party state	1991	Parliament, by majority	Unicameral
Armenia	Semi-presidential republic	2018	Parliament by majority	Unicameral
Bangladesh	Semi-presidential republic	1991 (Note: Was previously a parliamentary republic between 1971 and 1975.)	Parliament	Unicameral
Barbados	Constitutional monarchy	2021	Parliament, by two-thirds majority if there is no joint nomination	Bicameral
Botswana	British protectorate (Bechuanaland Protectorate)	1966	Parliament, by majority	Unicameral
Bulgaria	One-party state	1989	Direct election, by second-round system	Unicameral
Croatia	Semi-presidential republic	2000	Direct election, by second-round system	Unicameral
Czech Republic	One-party state (part of Czechoslovakia)	1989 (independent since 1993)	Direct election, by second-round system (since 2013; previously parliament, by majority)	Bicameral
Dominica	Associated state of the United Kingdom	1978	Parliament, by majority	Unicameral
Estonia	Occupied by the Soviet Union (one party state)	1918 (Note: Estonia was previously a parliamentary republic from 1918 until 1938, when a new constitution with a more presidential system was adopted; the country was occupied and annexed by the Soviet Union in 1940-41 (and again in 1944-91) .)	Parliament, by two-thirds majority	Unicameral
Fiji	Military dictatorship	2014	Parliament, by majority	Unicameral
Finland	Semi-presidential republic	2000 (Note: Formerly a semi-presidential republic, it is now a parliamentary republic according to David Arter, First Chair of Politics at Aberdeen University. In his "Scandinavian Politics Today" (Manchester University Press, revised 2008 ISBN 9780719078538), he quotes Nousiainen, Jaakko (June 2001). "From semi-presidentialism to parliamentary government: political and constitutional developments in Finland". Scandinavian Political Studies. 24 (2): 95–109. doi:10.1111/1467-9477.00048. as follows: "There are hardly any grounds for the epithet 'semi-presidential'." Arter's own conclusions are only slightly more nuanced: "The adoption of a new constitution on 1 March 2000 meant that Finland was no longer a case of semi-presidential government other than in the minimalist sense of a situation where a popularly elected fixed-term president exists alongside a prime minister and cabinet who are responsible to parliament (Elgie 2004: 317)". According to the Finnish Constitution, the president has no possibility to rule the government without the ministerial approval, and does not have the power to dissolve the parliament under his or her own desire. Finland is actually represented by its prime minister, and not by its president, in the Council of the Heads of State and Government of the European Union. The 2012 constitution reduced the powers of the president even further.)	Direct election, by second-round system	Unicameral
Georgia	Representative Democracy Governed as a Unitary Parliamentary Republic.	1921	Direct election, led by a group of people called “parliaments”	Bicameral
Greece	Military dictatorship; Constitutional monarchy	1975 (Note: Also between 1924 and 1935.)	Parliament, by supermajority (Note: Supermajority of 67% (two-thirds) required for the first two rounds. If the vote fails, the supermajority threshold is lowered to 60% (three-fifths), then absolute majority, and then simple majority (plurality). See "Article 32", The Constitution of Greece (PDF) (2019 ed.), Athens: Hellenic Parliament, 7 June 1975, archived (PDF) from the original on 25 February 2024)	Unicameral
Hungary	One-party state	1990	Parliament, by supermajority	Unicameral
Iceland	Formerly part of Denmark; Constitutional monarchy	1944	Direct election, by first-past-the-post	Unicameral
Republic of Ireland	Coalition	1949 (Note: Irish head of state from 1922 to 1949.)	Direct election, by instant-runoff vote	Bicameral
Israel	British Protectorate	1948	Parliament, by majority	Unicameral
Italy	Constitutional monarchy	1946	Parliament, by absolute majority	Bicameral
Kiribati	Protectorate	1979	Direct election, by first-past-the-post vote	Unicameral
Latvia	Occupied by the Soviet Union (one party state)	1918 (Note: Latvia was previously a parliamentary republic between 1921 and 1934 when the then prime minister Kārlis Ulmanis took power in a coup d'état. In June 1940 Latvia was occupied and annexed by the Soviet Union.)	Parliament	Unicameral
Lebanon	Protectorate (French mandate of Lebanon)	1941	Parliament	Unicameral
Malta	Constitutional monarchy	1974	Parliament, by majority	Unicameral
Marshall Islands	UN Trust Territory (part of Trust Territory of the Pacific Islands)	1979	Parliament	Bicameral
Mauritius	Constitutional monarchy	1992	Parliament, by majority	Unicameral
Moldova	Semi-presidential republic	2001	Direct election, by second-round system	Unicameral
Montenegro	One-party state (Part of Yugoslavia, and after Serbia and Montenegro)	1992 (independent since 2006)	Direct election, by second-round system	Unicameral
Nauru	Australian Trust Territory	1968	Parliament	Unicameral
North Macedonia	One-party state (part of Yugoslavia)	1991	Direct election, by second-round system	Unicameral
Poland	One-party state	1989	Direct election	Bicameral
San Marino	Autocracy (part of the Roman Empire)	301	Parliament	Unicameral
Serbia	One-party state (part of Yugoslavia)	1991 (independent since 2006)	Direct election, by second-round system	Unicameral
Singapore	Constitutional monarchy (part of Malaysia)	1965	Direct election (since 1993)	Unicameral
Slovakia	One-party state (part of Czechoslovakia)	1989 (independent since 1993)	Direct election, by second-round system (since 1999; previously by parliament)	Unicameral
Slovenia	One-party state (part of Yugoslavia)	1991	Direct election, by second-round system	Bicameral
South Africa	Constitutional monarchy	1961	Parliament, by majority	Bicameral
Suriname	Military dictatorship	1987	Parliament, by majority	Unicameral
Republic of China (Taiwan)	One-party military dictatorship (Mainland); Constitutional monarchy (Taiwan)	1946 (Note: The Additional Articles of the Constitution of the Republic of China was passed on May 1, 1991 effectively transforming into a semi-presidential system. The Republic of China government was defeated in the Chinese Civil War in 1949-50 to the Chinese Communist Party retreating to the island of Taiwan, which became a de facto one-party state from 1949 to 1987.)	Electoral college, directly elected by the electorate	Tricameral
Trinidad and Tobago	Constitutional monarchy	1976	Parliament	Bicameral
Togo	Presidential republic	2024	Parliament	Bicameral
Vanuatu	British–French condominium (New Hebrides)	1980	Parliament and regional council presidents, by majority	Unicameral

== See also ==
- Federal republic
