= D'Hondt method =

Method for allocating seats in parliaments

The D'Hondt method, (Note: English: /dəˈhɒnt/ də-HONT, Dutch: [tɔnt], French: [dɔ̃t]. The name D'Hondt is sometimes spelt as d'Hondt. Notably, it is customary in the Netherlands to write such surnames with a lower-case d when preceded by the forename: thus Victor d'Hondt (with a small d), while the surname all by itself would be D'Hondt (with a capital D). However, in Belgium it is always capitalized, hence: Victor D'Hondt.) also called the Jefferson method or the greatest divisors method, is an apportionment method for allocating seats in parliaments among federal states, or in proportional representation among political parties. It belongs to the class of highest-averages methods. Compared to ideal proportional representation, the D'Hondt method reduces somewhat the political fragmentation for smaller electoral district sizes, where it favors larger political parties over small parties.

The method was first described in 1792 by American Secretary of State and later President of the United States Thomas Jefferson. It was re-invented independently in 1878 by Belgian lawyer Victor D'Hondt, which is the reason for its two different names.

== Motivation ==
Proportional representation systems aim to allocate seats to parties approximately in proportion to the number of votes received. For example, if a party wins one-third of the votes then it should gain about one-third of the seats. In general, exact proportionality is not possible because these divisions produce fractional numbers of seats. As a result, several methods, of which the D'Hondt method is one, have been devised which ensure that the parties' seat allocations, which are of whole numbers, are as proportional as possible. Although all of these methods approximate proportionality, they do so by minimizing different kinds of disproportionality. The D'Hondt method minimizes the largest seats-to-votes ratio. Empirical studies based on other, more popular concepts of disproportionality show that the D'Hondt method is one of the least proportional among the proportional representation methods. The D'Hondt favours large parties and coalitions over small parties due to strategic voting. In comparison, the Sainte-Laguë method reduces the disproportional bias towards large parties and it generally has a more equal seats-to-votes ratio for different sized parties.

The axiomatic properties of the D'Hondt method were studied and they proved that the D'Hondt method is a consistent and monotone method that reduces political fragmentation by encouraging coalitions. A method is consistent if it treats parties that received tied votes equally. Monotonicity means that the number of seats provided to any state or party will not decrease if the house size increases.

== Procedure ==
After all the votes have been tallied, successive quotients are calculated for each party. The party with the largest quotient wins one seat, and its quotient is recalculated. This is repeated until the required number of seats is filled. The formula for the quotient is:

$$\text{quot} = \frac{V}{s+1}$$

where:

- V is the total number of votes that party received, and
- s is the number of seats that party has been allocated so far, initially zero for all parties.

The total votes cast for each party in the electoral district is divided, first by one, then by two, then three, up to the total number of seats to be allocated for the district or constituency. Say there are p parties and s seats. Then a grid of numbers can be created, with p rows and s columns, where the entry in the ith row and jth column is the number of votes won by the ith party, divided by j. The s winning entries are the s highest numbers in the whole grid; each party is given as many seats as there are winning entries in its row.

Alternatively, the procedure can be reversed by starting with a house apportionment that assigns "too many seats" to every party, then removing legislators one at a time from the most-overrepresented party.

== Example ==
In this example, 230,000 voters decide the disposition of eight seats among four parties. Since eight seats are to be allocated, each party's total votes are divided by one, then by two, three, and four (and then, if necessary, by five, six, seven, and so on). The eight highest entries (in bold text) range from 100,000 down to 25,000. For each, the corresponding party gets a seat. Note that in round one, the quotient shown in the table, as derived from the formula, is precisely the number of votes returned in the ballot.

Round (one seat per round)	1	2	3	4	5	6	7	8	Seats won (bold)
Party A quotient seats after round	**100,000**; **1**	50,000; 1	**50,000**; **2**	33,333; 2	**33,333**; **3**	25,000; 3	25,000; 3	**25,000**; **4**	**4**
Party B quotient seats after round	80,000; 0	**80,000**; **1**	40,000; 1	**40,000**; **2**	26,667; 2	26,667; 2	**26,667**; **3**	20,000; 3	**3**
Party C quotient seats after round	30,000; 0	30,000; 0	30,000; 0	30,000; 0	30,000; 0	**30,000**; **1**	15,000; 1	15,000; 1	**1**
Party D quotient seats after round	20,000; 0	20,000; 0	20,000; 0	20,000; 0	20,000; 0	20,000; 0	20,000; 0	20,000; 0	**0**

While in this example, parties B, C, and D formed a coalition against Party A: Party A received 3 seats instead of 4 due to the coalition having 30,000 more votes than Party A.

Round (1 seat per round)	1	2	3	4	5	6	7	8	Seats won (bold)
Party A quotient seats after round	100,000; 0	**100,000**; **1**	50,000; 1	**50,000**; **2**	33,333; 2	**33,333**; **3**	25,000; 3	25,000; 3	**3**
Coalition B-C-D quotient seats after round	**130,000**; **1**	65,000; 1	**65,000**; **2**	43,333; 2	**43,333**; **3**	32,500; 3	**32,500**; **4**	**26,000**; **5**	**5**

The chart below shows an easy way to perform the calculation. Each party's vote is divided by 1, 2, 3, or 4 in consecutive columns, then the 8 highest values resulting are selected. The quantity of highest values in each row is the number of seats won.

For comparison, the "True proportion" column shows the exact fractional numbers of seats due, calculated in proportion to the number of votes received. (For example, 100,000/230,000 × 8 = 3.48) The slight favouring of the largest party over the smallest is apparent.

Denominator	/1	/2	/3	/4	Seats won (*)	True proportion
Party A	**100,000***	**50,000***	**33,333***	**25,000***	**4**	3.5
Party B	**80,000***	**40,000***	**26,667***	20,000	**3**	2.8
Party C	**30,000***	15,000	10,000	7,500	**1**	1.0
Party D	20,000	10,000	6,667	5,000	**0**	0.7
Total					8	8

=== Further examples ===
A worked-through example for non-experts relating to the 2019 European Parliament election in the United Kingdom written by Christina Pagel for UK in a Changing Europe is available.

A more mathematically detailed example has been written by British mathematician Professor Helen Wilson.

== Approximate proportionality under D'Hondt ==
The D'Hondt method approximates proportionality by minimizing the largest seats-to-votes ratio among all parties.

This ratio is also known as the advantage ratio. In contrast, the average seats-to-votes ratio is optimized by the Webster/Sainte-Laguë method.

For party $p \in \{1,\dots,P\}$, where $P$ is the overall number of parties, the advantage ratio is

$$a_p=\frac{s_p}{v_p},$$

where

- $s_p$ – the seat share of party $p$, $s_p \in [0,1],\;\sum_p s_p = 1$,
- $v_p$ – the vote share of party $p$, $v_p \in [0,1],\;\sum_p v_p = 1$.

The largest advantage ratio,

$$\delta = \max_p a_p,$$

captures how over-represented the most over-represented party is.

The D'Hondt method assigns seats so that this ratio attains its smallest possible value,

$$\delta^* = \min_{\mathbf{s} \in \mathcal{S}} \max_p a_p,$$

where $\mathbf{s}=\{s_1,\dots,s_P\}$ is a seat allocation from the set of all allowed seat allocations $\mathcal{S}$. Thanks to this, as shown by Juraj Medzihorsky, the D'Hondt method splits the votes into exactly proportionally represented ones and residual ones. The overall fraction of residual votes is

$$\pi^* = 1 - \frac{1}{\delta^*}.$$

The residuals of party p are

$$r_p = v_p - (1-\pi^*) s_p,\; r_p \in [0, v_p], \sum_p\,r_p=\pi^*.$$

For illustration, continue with the above example of four parties. The advantage ratios of the four parties are 1.2 for A, 1.1 for B, 1 for C, and 0 for D. The reciprocal of the largest advantage ratio is 1/1.15 = 0.87 = 1 − π^{*}. The residuals as shares of the total vote are 0% for A, 2.2% for B, 2.2% for C, and 8.7% for party D. Their sum is 13%, i.e., 1 − 0.87 = 0.13. The decomposition of the votes into represented and residual ones is shown in the table below.

Allocation of eight seats under the D'Hondt method
Party	Vote share	Seat share	Advantage ratio	Residual votes	Represented votes
A	43.5%	50.0%	1.15	0.0%	43.5%
B	34.8%	37.5%	1.08	2.2%	32.6%
C	13.0%	12.5%	0.96	2.2%	10.9%
D	8.7%	0.0%	0.00	8.7%	0.0%
Total	100%	100%	—	13%	87%

== Jefferson and D'Hondt ==
The Jefferson and the D'Hondt methods are equivalent. They always give the same results, but the methods of presenting the calculation are different.

The method was first described in 1792 by US Secretary of State and future President Thomas Jefferson, in a letter to George Washington regarding the apportionment of seats in the United States House of Representatives pursuant to the First United States Census:

For representatives there can be no such common ratio, or divisor which ... will divide them exactly without a remainder or fraction. I answer then ... that representatives [must be divided] as nearly as the nearest ratio will admit; and the fractions must be neglected.

Washington had exercised his first veto power on a bill that introduced a new plan for dividing seats in the House of Representatives that would have increased the number of seats for northern states. Ten days after the veto, Congress passed a new method of apportionment, later known as Jefferson's Method. It was used to achieve the proportional distribution of seats in the House of Representatives among the states until 1842.

It was also invented independently in 1878 in Europe, by Belgian mathematician Victor D'Hondt, who wrote in his publication Système pratique et raisonné de représentation proportionnelle, published in Brussels in 1882:

To allocate discrete entities proportionally among several numbers, it is necessary to divide these numbers by a common divisor, producing quotients whose sum is equal to the number of entities to be allocated.

The system can be used both for distributing seats in a legislature among states pursuant to populations or among parties pursuant to an election result. The tasks are mathematically equivalent, putting states in the place of parties and population in place of votes. In some countries, the Jefferson system is known by the names of local politicians or experts who introduced them locally. For example, it is known in Israel as the Bader–Ofer system.

Jefferson's method uses a quota (called a divisor), as in the largest remainder method. The divisor is chosen as necessary so that the resulting quotients, disregarding any fractional remainders, sum to the required total; in other words, pick a number so that there is no need to examine the remainders. Any number in one range of quotas will accomplish this, with the highest number in the range always being the same as the lowest number used by the D'Hondt method to award a seat (if it is used rather than the Jefferson method), and the lowest number in the range being the smallest number larger than the next number which would award a seat in the D'Hondt calculations.

Applied to the above example of party lists, this range extends as integers from 20,001 to 25,000. More precisely, any number n for which 20,000 < n ≤ 25,000 can be used.

== Threshold ==
The D'Hondt method reduces political fragmentation by allocating more seats to larger parties. This effect is strongest for small electoral district sizes; for legislatures with many members, elected in a single national list, the effects of using one proportional method rather than another are negligible.

An alternative approach to reduce political fragmentation are electoral thresholds, where any list which does not achieve that threshold will not have any seats allocated to it, even if it received enough votes to have otherwise been rewarded with a seat. Examples of countries using the D'Hondt method with a threshold are Albania (3% for single parties, 5% for coalitions of two or more parties, 1% for independent individuals); Denmark (2%); East Timor, Spain, Serbia, and Montenegro (3%); Israel (3.25%); Slovenia and Bulgaria (4%); Croatia, Fiji, Romania, Russia and Tanzania (5%); Turkey (7%); Poland (5%, or 8% for coalitions; but does not apply for ethnic-minority parties), Hungary (5% for single party, 10% for two-party coalitions, 15% for coalitions of 3 or more parties) and Belgium (5%, on regional basis). In the Netherlands, a party must win enough votes for one strictly proportional full seat (note that this is not necessary in plain D'Hondt), which with 150 seats in the lower chamber gives an effective threshold of 0.67%. In Estonia, candidates receiving the simple quota in their electoral districts are considered elected, but in the second (district level) and third round of counting (nationwide, modified D'Hondt method) mandates are awarded only to candidate lists receiving more than the threshold of 5% of the votes nationally. The vote threshold simplifies the process of seat allocation and discourages fringe parties (those that are likely to gain very few votes) from competing in the elections. Obviously, the higher the vote threshold, the fewer the parties that will be represented in parliament.

The method can cause a natural threshold. It depends on the number of seats that are allocated with the D'Hondt method. In Finland's parliamentary elections, there is no official threshold, but the effective threshold is gaining one seat. The country is divided into districts with different numbers of representatives, so there is a natural threshold, different in each district. The largest district, Uusimaa with 33 representatives, has a natural threshold of 3%, while the smallest district, South Savo with 6 representatives, has a natural threshold of 14%. This favors large parties in the small districts. In Croatia, the official threshold is 5% for parties and coalitions. However, since the country is divided into 10 voting districts with 14 elected representatives each, sometimes the threshold can be higher, depending on the number of votes of "fallen lists" (lists that do not receive at least 5%). If many votes are lost in this manner, a list that gets 5% will still get a seat, whereas if there is a small number votes for parties that do not pass the threshold, the actual ("natural") threshold is close to 7.15%. Some systems allow parties to associate their lists together into a single "cartel" in order to overcome the threshold, while some systems set a separate threshold for such cartels. Smaller parties often form pre-election coalitions to make sure they get past the election threshold creating a coalition government. In the Netherlands, cartels (lijstverbindingen) (until 2017, when they were abolished) could not be used to overcome the threshold, but they do influence the distribution of remainder seats; thus, smaller parties can use them to get a chance which is more like that of the big parties.

In French municipal and regional elections, the D'Hondt method is used to attribute a number of council seats; however, a fixed proportion of them (50% for municipal elections, 25% for regional elections) is automatically given to the list with the greatest number of votes, to ensure that it has a working majority: this is called the "majority bonus" (prime à la majorité), and only the remainder of the seats are distributed proportionally (including to the list which has already received the majority bonus). In Italian local elections a similar system is used, where the party or coalition of parties linked to the elected mayor automatically receives 60% of seats; unlike the French model though the remainder of the seats are not distributed again to the largest party.

== Variations ==
In some cases such as the Czech regional elections, the first divisor (when the party has no seats so far, which is normally 1) is raised to create an effective threshold, favoring larger parties and eliminating small ones. In the Czech case, it is set to 1.42 (approximately $\sqrt{2}$, termed the Koudelka coefficient after the politician who introduced it).

In 1989 and 1992, ACT Legislative Assembly elections were conducted by the Australian Electoral Commission using a modified d'Hondt electoral system. The electoral system consisted of the d'Hondt system, the Australian Senate system of proportional representation, and various methods for preferential voting for candidates and parties, both within and across party lines. The process involves 8 stages of scrutiny. ABC elections analyst Antony Green has described the modified d'Hondt system used in the ACT as a "monster ... that few understood, even electoral officials who had to wrestle with its intricacies while spending several weeks counting the votes". It was replaced with the Hare-Clark system from 1995 onward.

Because of the strong seat bias in D'Hondt, some systems allow parties to associate their lists together into a single electoral alliance in order to overcome the threshold and win more (or any) seats. Some systems set a separate threshold for such alliances. In a system of proportional representation where the country is divided in multiple electoral district (such as Belgium) the threshold to obtain one seat can be very high (5% of votes in a district since 2003), which also favors larger parties.

=== Regional D'Hondt ===
In most countries, seats for the national assembly are divided on a regional or even a provincial level. This means that seats are first divided between individual regions (or provinces) and are then allocated to the parties in each region separately (based on only the votes cast in the given region). The votes for parties that have not gained a seat at the regional level are thus discarded, so they do not aggregate at a national level. This means that parties which would have gained seats in a national distribution of seats may still end up with no seats as they did not gain enough votes in any region. This may also lead to skewed seat allocation at a national level, such as in Spain in 2011 where the People's Party gained an absolute majority in the Congress of Deputies with only 44% of the national vote. It may also skew results for small parties with broad appeal at a national level compared to small parties with a local appeal (e.g. nationalist parties). For instance, in the 2008 Spanish general election, United Left (Spain) gained 1 seat for 969,946 votes, whereas Convergence and Union (Catalonia) gained 10 seats for 779,425 votes.

=== Modified d'Hondt electoral system ===
The modified d'Hondt electoral system is a variant of the d'Hondt method with an electoral threshold for parties. Votes for parties below the electoral threshold are transferred to other candidates according to the single transferable voting method. This electoral system was used in 1989 and 1992 Australian Capital Territory elections.

== Usage by country ==
The D'Hondt method is used to elect the legislatures in Åland, Albania, Angola, Argentina, Armenia, Aruba, Austria, Belgium, Bolivia, Brazil, Burundi, Cambodia, Cape Verde, Chile, Colombia, Croatia, the Dominican Republic, East Timor, Estonia, Fiji, Finland, Greenland, Guatemala, Hungary (in a mixed system), Iceland, Israel, Italy (in a mixed system), Japan, Luxembourg, Moldova, Monaco, Montenegro, Mozambique, Netherlands, Nicaragua, North Macedonia, Paraguay, Peru, Poland, Portugal, Romania, San Marino, Serbia, Slovenia, Spain, Switzerland, Turkey, Uruguay, Venezuela and Wales. In Denmark the D'Hondt method is used to elect part of the seats in the Folketing and the disproportionality of the D'Hondt method is corrected with leveling seats with Sainte-Laguë method. The D'Hondt system is used for the "top-up" seats in the Scottish Parliament, and the London Assembly; in some countries for elections to the European Parliament; and was used during the 1997 constitution era to allocate party-list parliamentary seats in Thailand. The system is also used in practice for the allocation between political groups of numerous posts (vice presidents, committee chairmen and vice-chairmen, delegation chairmen and vice-chairmen) in the European Parliament and for the allocation of ministers in the Northern Ireland Assembly. It is also used to calculate the results in German and Austrian works council elections.
