= Indirect single transferable voting =

Version of the single transferable vote system

Indirect single transferable voting or Gove system is a version of single transferable vote (STV), where the vote transfer is determined by the candidate's instructions, not voter's marked preferences. This system produces many of the benefits of STV without the complexity of having voters mark ranked votes. Under indirect STV, there would be no need to concentrate the votes in one place for vote transfers to be performed.

Indirect STV was invented by Walter Baily, of Leeds, and put forward in his 1872 book PR in Large Constituencies.

Archibald E. Dobbs of Ireland, author of Representative Reform for Ireland (1879), wrote of indirect STV in his 1871 book General Representation.

Legislator William H. Gove, of Salem, Massachusetts, defended it publicly in the 1890s.

Indirect STV, as defined here, is not used currently in government elections.

Indirect single transferable voting is distinct from an indirect election by the single transferable vote, which means an election by a legislative body or electoral college (instead of the enfranchised population) using the single transferable vote election system. Indirect election by the single transferable vote is used to elect some members in some states of India and for election of some positions within the Indian national assembly. The indirect single transferable voting is used to elect some members of the Senate of Pakistan. (Election of many Senate members is done by elected provincial members, using STV of the usual form.)
