= Mixed electoral system =

Family of voting systems

Countries that use a mixed electoral system to elect the lower house or unicameral legislature.

A mixed electoral system is one that uses different electoral systems to fill different seats in a legislature. Most often, this involves a First Past the Post combined with a proportional component. The results of the combination may be mixed-member proportional (MMP), where the overall results of the elections are proportional, or mixed-member majoritarian, in which case the overall results are semi-proportional, retaining disproportionalities from the majoritarian component. Systems that use multiple types of combinations are sometimes called supermixed.

Mixed-member systems also often combine local representation (most often single-member constituencies) with regional or national (multi-member constituencies) representation, having multiple tiers. This also means voters often elect different types of representatives who might have different types of constituencies. Some representatives may be elected by personal elections where voters vote for candidates, and some by list elections where voters vote for electoral lists of parties.

In most mixed systems, every voter can influence both the district-based and PR aspects of an election, such as under parallel voting; however, some countries have multiple coexisting electoral systems that each apply to different voters.

== Types of mixed systems ==
=== Compensatory/non-compensatory seat allocation ===
A major distinction is often made between mixed compensatory systems and mixed non-compensatory systems. In both types of systems, one set of seats is allocated using a plurality or majoritarian method, usually first past the post. The remaining seats are allocated to political parties partially or wholly based on a proportional allocation method such as highest averages, largest remainder, or percentage points. The difference is whether or not the results of the district elections are considered when allocating the PR seats.

In mixed non-compensatory systems, such as parallel voting, the proportional allocation is performed independently of the district election component.

In mixed compensatory systems, the allocation of the top-up seats is done in such a way as to compensate as much as possible for dis-proportionality produced by the district elections. MMP generally produces proportional election outcomes, meaning that a political party that wins n percent of the vote will receive roughly n percent of the seats.

The following hypothetical example based on the one by Massicotte illustrates how "top-up" PR seats are typically allocated in a compensatory system and in a non-compensatory system. The example assumes a 200-seat legislative assembly where 100 seats are filled using FPTP and the other 100 seats are awarded to parties using a form of PR. The table below gives the popular vote and FPTP results. The number of PR seats allocated to each party depends on whether the system is compensatory or non-compensatory.

| Party | Popular vote | FPTP seats | PR seats | Total seats (FPTP + PR) | FPTP seats |
|---|---|---|---|---|---|
| Party A | 44% | 64 | ? | ? | |
| Party B | 40% | 33 | ? | ? | |
| Party C | 10% | 0 | ? | ? | |
| Party D | 6% | 3 | ? | ? | |
| TOTAL | 100% | 100 | 100 | 200 | |

In non compensatory system, each party wins its proportional share of the 100 PR seats. Under such a system, the total number of seats (FPTP + PR) received by each party would not be proportional to its share of the popular vote. Party A receives just slightly less of the popular vote than Party B, but receives significantly more seats. In addition to its success in the district contests, Party A receives almost as many of the PR seats as Party B.

| Party | Popular vote | FPTP seats | PR seats (non-compensatory) | Total seats (FPTP + PR) | PR seats (non-compensatory) | Total seats (FPTP + PR) |
|---|---|---|---|---|---|---|
| Party A | 44% | 64 | 44 | 108 (54% of assembly) | | |
| Party B | 40% | 33 | 40 | 73 (36.5% of assembly) | | |
| Party C | 10% | 0 | 10 | 10 (5% of assembly) | | |
| Party D | 6% | 3 | 6 | 9 (4.5% of assembly) | | |
| TOTAL | 100% | 100 | 100 | 200 | | |

If the PR seats are allocated in a compensatory system, the total number of seats awarded to each party is proportional to the party's share of the popular vote. Party B wins 33 of the district seats and its proportional share of the 200 seats being filled is 80 seats (40 percent of the total 200 seats) (the same as its share of the popular vote) so it is awarded 47 of the PR seats.

| Party | Popular vote | FPTP seats | PR seats (compensatory) | Total seats (FPTP + PR) | PR seats (compensatory) | Total seats (FPTP + PR) |
|---|---|---|---|---|---|---|
| Party A | 44% | 64 | 24 | 88 (44% of assembly) | | |
| Party B | 40% | 33 | 47 | 80 (40% of assembly) | | |
| Party C | 10% | 0 | 20 | 20 (10% of assembly) | | |
| Party D | 6% | 3 | 9 | 12 (6% of assembly) | | |
| TOTAL | 100% | 100 | 100 | 200 | | |

In practice, compensatory seat allocation is complicated by the possibility that one or more parties wins so many of the district seats ("overhang") that the available number of PR seats is insufficient to produce a fully proportional outcome. Some mixed compensatory systems have rules that address these situations by adding additional PR seats to achieve overall PR. These seats are used only until the next election, unless needed again at that time.

The two common ways compensation occurs are seat linkage compensation (or top-up) and vote linkage compensation (or vote transfer). Like a non-compensatory mixed system, a compensatory mixed system may be based on the mixed single vote (voters vote for a local candidate and that vote is used to set the party share of the popular vote for the party that the candidate belongs to) or it may be based on voters casting two separate votes.

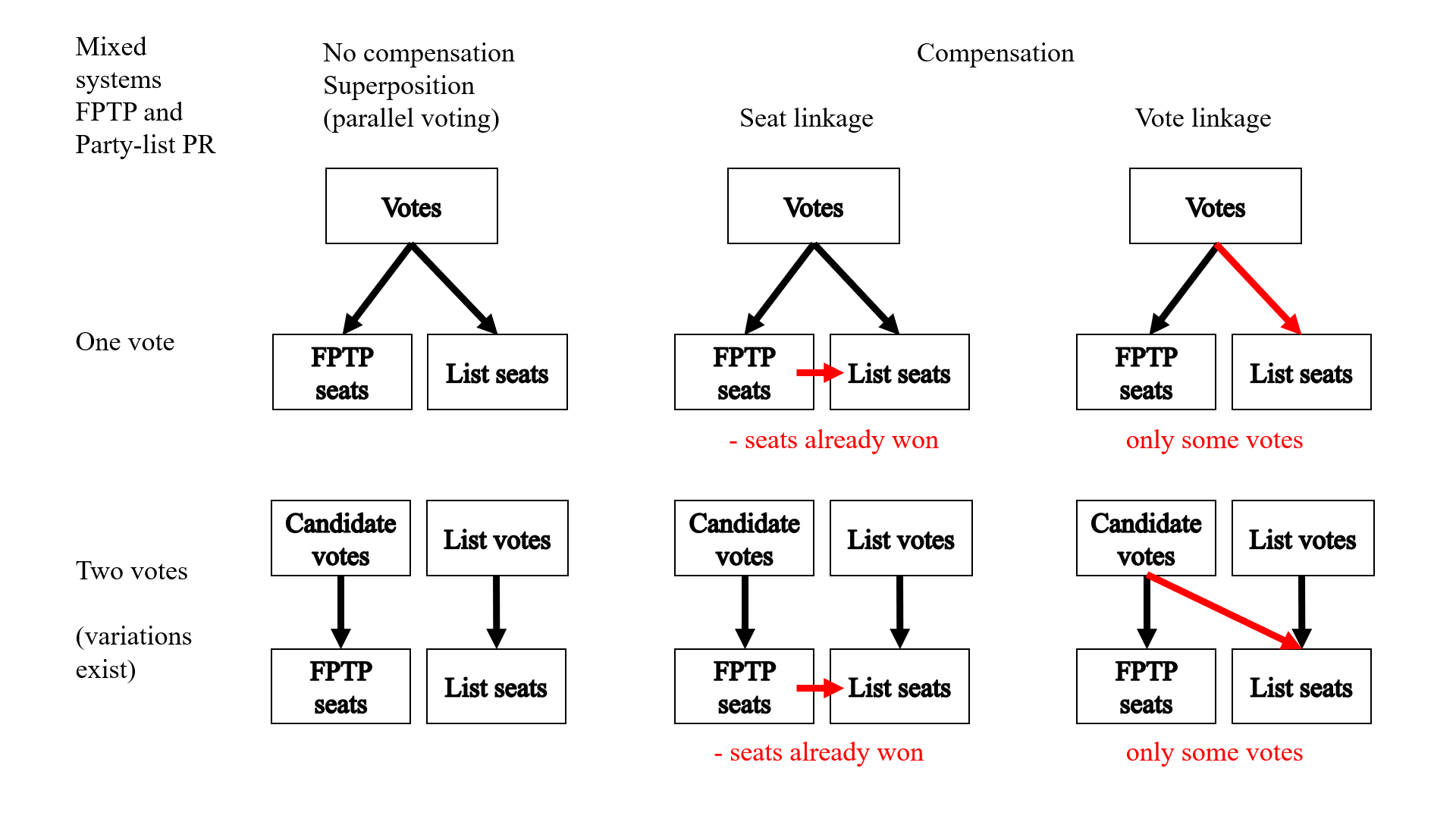
Comparison of most common types of two-tier mixed systems by number of votes and compensation

Compensatory mixed systems
| | single vote systems | dual vote systems |
|---|---|---|
| Seat linkage | mixed single vote, top-up versions (MSV): single vote (Lesotho); 50-point proportional representation (Proportional-first-past-the-post) | Two vote "top-up" - broadly mixed-member proportional representation (MMP): additional member system (AMS); alternative vote plus (AV+) |
| Seat linkage | mixed single vote, top-up versions (MSV): single vote (Lesotho); 50-point proportional representation (Proportional-first-past-the-post) | Hybrids: e.g. parallel voting+seat linkage compensation (South Korea) |
| Vote linkage | positive vote transfer (PVT): Hungary (local elections) | Hybrids: Parallel voting+PVT (Hungary); negative vote transfer/scorporo (Italy, 1993–2005) |
| Vote linkage | Others systems: | |
| Vote linkage | dual-member proportional (DMP) | mixed ballot transferable vote (MBTV) |
Non-compensatory mixed systems
| | single vote systems | dual vote systems |
| No linkage | - | parallel voting |
| Vote linkage | mixed single vote, superposition: Italian variant (Rosatellum) | - |
| Seat linkage | List seats proportional to FPTP seats: Pakistan; Bangladesh | - |

=== Types of combinations ===
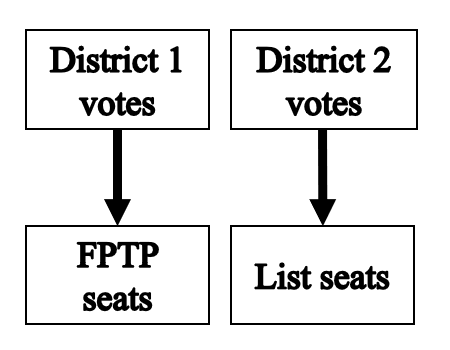
A diagram of a coexistence based mixed electoral system combining first-past-the-post and party-list proportional representation.

Apart from the compensatory/non-compensatory typology, a more detailed classification is possible based on how component systems relate to each other, according to academic literature. Below is a table of different categories of mixed electoral systems based on the five main types identified by Massicotte & Blais. According to their terminology, methods of compensation are referred to as compensation is referred to as correction, while another type of dependent combination exists, called the conditional relation between sub-systems. Meanwhile, independent combinations mixed systems might have both local and national/regional tiers (called superposition), but some have only one at-large (national) tier, like the majority bonus system (fusion) or only a single tier for local/regional representation (called coexistence).

There are also supermixed systems, like rural-urban proportional (RUP), which is a hybrid mixed system that uses two tiers: the lower tier uses a proportional system, like list-PR or STV, in urban regions, and the upper tier uses MMP (itself a mixed system) either in rural regions alone or in all regions.

| Combination | Type | Attributes | System | Example(s) for use |
|---|---|---|---|---|
| Independent combination | Fusion | Two formulas are used within each district (or one district for the whole electorate) | Majority bonus (MBS) | France (local), French Polynesia |
| Independent combination | Coexistence (hybrid) | Different districts use different systems in one tier | e.g. FPTP/SMP in single-member districts, list-PR in multi-member districts | Democratic Republic of the Congo, Panama |
| Independent combination | Superposition | Different tiers use different systems | Parallel voting (e.g. FPTP/SMP locally, list-PR nationally) | Lithuania, Russia |
| Independent combination | Superposition | Different tiers use different systems | Single vote mixed-member majoritarian (e.g. FPTP/SMP locally, list-PR nationally) | Italy, Pakistan |
| Dependent combination | Correction (compensation) | One formula uses the results of other to compensate | Seat linkage mixed system with partial correction for overhang seats: New Zealand's mixed-member proportional representation (MMP) | New Zealand |
| Dependent combination | Correction (compensation) | One formula uses the results of other to compensate | Seat linkage mixed system with no correction for overhang seats: UK Additional member system (AMS) - a less proportional version of MMP | Scotland |
| Dependent combination | Correction (compensation) | One formula uses the results of other to compensate | Single vote with seat linkage (for mixed-member proportional representation) 50-point proportional representation (correction via percentage points) | Lesotho - |
| Dependent combination | Correction (compensation) | One formula uses the results of other to compensate | Single vote with compensatory vote transfer (semi-proportional) | Hungary (local) |
| Dependent combination | Conditional | Outcome of one formula determines the other formula | e.g. conditional party block voting: party that receives more than 50%, gets all seats otherwise all seats distributed proportionally | - |
| Combination of combinations | Supermixed | Superposition + correction | Scorporo / negative vote transfer (NVT), Parallel voting + PVT | Hungary |
| Combination of combinations | Supermixed | Superposition + correction | Parallel voting + seat linkage | South Korea |
| Combination of combinations | Supermixed | Superposition + fusion | National plurality bonus in regional list-PR | Greece |
| Combination of combinations | Supermixed | Superposition + coexistence | e.g. some elected by PR in single national district, some are elected locally by plurality | Ecuador |
| Combination of combinations | Supermixed | Coexistence + conditional | e.g. FPTP/SMP in single-member districts, conditional party block voting in multi-member districts | Cameroon, Chad |
| Combination of combinations | Supermixed | Coexistence + correction | Rural-urban proportional representation (RUP) | Denmark (formerly), Iceland (formerly) |
| Combination of combinations | Supermixed | Conditional + correction + fusion | Majority jackpot systems, particularly two-round variants | Armenia, San Marino |
| Combination of combinations | Supermixed | Fusion + correction | Dual-member proportional representation (DMP) | - |

In a hybrid system, different electoral formulas are used in different contexts. These may be seen in coexistence, when different methods are used in different regions of a country, such as when FPTP is used in single-member districts and list-PR in multi-member districts, but every voter is a member of only one district (one tier). Some hybrid systems are generally not referred to as mixed systems, such as when as FPTP districts are the exception (e.g. overseas constituency) and list-PR is the rule, the overall system is usually considered proportional. Similarly, when FPTP is in single-member districts and used block voting (or party block voting) is used in multi-member districts, the system is referred to as a majoritarian one, as all components are majoritarian. Most mixed systems are not referred to as hybrid systems

=== Mixed-member majoritarian and mixed-member proportional ===
Another distinction of mixed electoral systems is between mixed-member proportional representation (MMP) and mixed-member majoritarian representation (MMM).

==== Parallel voting ====
Parallel voting is a mixed non-compensatory system with two tiers of representatives: a tier of single-member district representatives elected by a plurality/majoritarian method such as FPTP/SMP, and a tier of regional or at-large representatives elected by a separate proportional method such as party list PR. It is used for the first chamber (lower house) in many countries including Japan and Russia.

This type of parallel voting provides semi-proportional results, but is often referred to as mixed-member majoritarian representation, as the lack of compensation means each party can keep all the overhang seats it might win on the majoritarian side of the electoral system.

==== Seat linkage compensatory systems ====
Like parallel voting, MMP and AMS also have a tier of district representatives typically elected by FPTP, and a tier of regional or at-large representatives elected by PR. Unlike parallel voting, MMP and AMS are mixed compensatory systems, meaning that the PR seats are allocated in a manner that corrects disproportionality caused by the district tier. MMP corrects disproportionalities by adding as many leveling seats as needed, this system is used by Germany and New Zealand.

A type of MMP used in the UK which does not always yield proportional results, but sometimes only "mixed semi-proportional representation" is called the additional member system. If the fixed number of compensatory seats are enough to compensate the results of the majoritarian FPTP/SMP side of the election, AMS is equivalent to MMP, but if not, AMS does not compensate for remaining overhang seats. The AMS models used in parts of the UK (Scotland and formerly Wales), with small regions with a fixed number of seats tend to produce only moderately proportional election outcomes.

In Lesotho, where a single vote versions seat linkage us used with a relatively large number of compensatory seats, results are usually proportional.

AV+ is a mixed compensatory system similar to the additional member system, with the notable difference that the district seats are awarded using the alternative vote. The system was proposed by the Jenkins Commission as a possible alternative to FPTP for elections to the Parliament of the United Kingdom.

Dual member mixed proportional (DMP) is a mixed compensatory system using the same principle as more common variants of MMP, except that the plurality and PR seats are paired and dedicated to dual-member (two seat) districts. Proposed as an alternative to FPTP for Canadian elections, DMP appeared as an option on a 2016 plebiscite in Prince Edward Island and a 2018 referendum in British Columbia.

50-point proportional representation (proportional-first-past-the-post) is a mixed compensatory single vote system that allocates compensatory seats using percentage points (50 percentage points equals one seat).

==== Vote linkage compensatory systems ====
Vote linkage compensatory systems are an alternative to seat linkage compensation, currently only used in Hungary as part of a supermixed system. Such systems in use have been (inaccurately) described as mixed member proportional, but they were more commonly between MMP and MMM in nature, or closer to mixed-member majoritarian representation, offering little compensatory power.

MBTV is a mixed compensatory type of systems similar to MSV, except voters can vote separately for a local candidate and as a transfer vote on the compensatory tier. It is different from MMP/AMS and AV+ in that there is a vote linkage (instead of seat linkage) between the tiers. The two parts of the dual ballot are tied in a way that only those lists votes get counted, which are on ballots that would be transfer votes in an equivalent positive vote transfer MSV system.

Scorporo is a two-tier mixed system similar to MMP in that voters have two votes (one for a local candidate on the lower tier, and one for a party list on the upper tier), except that disproportionality caused by the single-member district tier is partially addressed through a vote transfer mechanism. Votes that are critical to the election of district-winning candidates are excluded from the PR seat allocation, for this reason the method used by scorporo is referred to as a negative vote transfer system. The system was used in Italy from 1993 to 2005

==== Majority bonus and majority jackpot systems ====
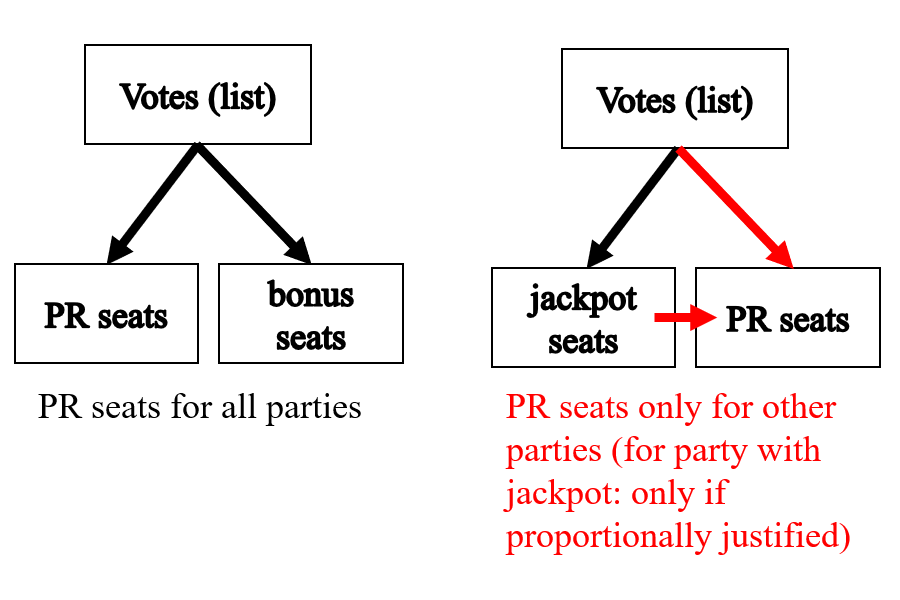
A simple bonus system (left) is also called a fusion type of mixed system. It mixes the FPTP and PR formulas in the same district and tier. A majority jackpot (right) is a supermixed system with a conditional and compensatory element as well.

Electoral systems with a majority bonus or jackpot have been referred to as "unconventional mixed systems", which fall into the mixed-member majoritarian type, but they may be compensatory (jackpot) or non-compensatory (bonus). Employed by Armenia, Greece, and San Marino, as well as Italy from 2006 to 2013, majority bonuses help the most popular party or alliance win a majority of the seats with a minority of the votes, similar in principle to plurality/majoritarian systems. However, PR is used to distribute the rest of seats (sometimes only among the opposition parties) and possibly within the governing alliance.

=== Number of votes ===
==== Double vote ====
Most mixed systems allow voters to cast separate votes for different formulas of the electoral system, including:

- Parallel voting
- Most "MMP" systems
- AV+ (the first vote is ranked)
- Scorporo

==== Mixed single vote (MSV) ====
MSV is a type of mixed systems using only a single vote that serves both as a vote for a local candidate and as a party list vote, split ticket voting is not possible. The system was used in Germany in a mixed proportional system, and is currently used in Hungary as a semi-proportional system as well as Italy in a non-compensatory system. Other mixed systems using a single vote include majority bonus/jackpot systems and DMP.

Other systems that are usually considered mixed, which use a single vote are:

- Majority bonus and jackpot (a single party-list vote)
- DMP (a vote for a single candidate or a two-candidate ticket)

The RUP systems formerly used in Denmark and Iceland used a single vote, applicable both for the lower-tier constituencies - FPTP in the rural single-member constituencies, and list PR in the urban multi-member constituencies - and for the upper-tier national leveling seats (and in Denmark, also for the middle-tier regional leveling seats in rural areas). The implementation of RUP proposed in Canada foresees urban multi-member districts that use a single transferable vote, alongside single-member rural districts that are grouped in large multi-member regions; the rural districts and their corresponding regions.

==== Double simultaneous vote (DSV) ====
A simultaneous vote is a single vote that used in more than one elections held at once, which means it is not a typically regarded as a mixed system.

== List of countries using mixed systems ==
List of countries using mixed electoral systems to elect the lower (or only) house of national legislature
| Compensatory Mixed-member proportional (seat linkage) type compensatory Vote linkage type partially compensatory (supermixed) Majority jackpot Two round majority jackpot | Non-compensatory Parallel voting (Party list + FPTP) Parallel voting (Party list + TRS) Parallel voting (Party list + BV/PBV) Majority bonus (fusion) |

The table below lists the countries that use a mixed electoral system for the primary (lower) chamber of the legislature. Countries with coexistence-based hybrid systems have been excluded from the table, as have countries that mix two plurality/majoritarian systems. (See also the complete list of electoral systems by country.)

=== National legislatures ===
| Country | Body | Type of body | Type of mixed system | Seats per constituency | Mixed system | Component electoral systems | Total seats | Number of votes | Typical results | Notes |
|---|---|---|---|---|---|---|---|---|---|---|
| Andorra | General Council | Unicameral national legislature | Non-compensatory | 2 (local districts), 14 (nationwide constituency) | Parallel voting (superposition) | Party block voting (PBV) and party-list PR | 28 | 2 | semi-proportional | The parish lists and the national list are independent of one another: the same person cannot appear on both the national list and on a parish list, and voters cast two separate ballots (there is no requirement to vote for the same party for both lists). |
| Armenia | National Assembly | Unicameral national legislature | Partially compensatory | | Majority jackpot system | Party-list PR + party block voting (PBV) | [data missing] | 1 (potential two rounds) | semi-proportional | |
| (Bolivia) Bolivia | Chamber of Deputies | Lower house of national legislature | Compensatory | 1 (local districts), ? (regional constituencies), 7 (indigenous seats elected by the usos y costumbres) | Seat linkage MMP without levelling seats | First-past-the-post (FPTP/SMP) + Party-list PR | 130 | 2 (list ballot is DSV) | proportional | List ballots are a double simultaneous vote together with the presidential election |
| Djibouti | National Assembly | Unicameral national legislature | Partially compensatory | 3-28 | Majority jackpot system | [data missing] | 65 | 1 | semi-proportional | 80% of seats (rounded to the nearest integer) in each constituency are awarded to the party receiving the most votes (party block voting), remaining seats are allocated proportionally to other parties receiving over 10% (closed list, D'Hondt method) |
| (Georgia (country)) Georgia | Parliament | Unicameral national legislature | Non-compensatory | [data missing] | Parallel voting (superposition) | [data missing] | 150 | [data missing] | semi-proportional | |
| (Greece) Greece | Hellenic Parliament | Unicameral national legislature | Non-compensatory | [data missing] | Majority bonus | [data missing] | [data missing] | [data missing] | semi-proportional | |
| Hungary | National Assembly (Országgyűlés) | Unicameral national legislature | Partially compensatory | 1 (local districts), 93 (national constituency) | Supermixed: parallel voting (superposition) and positive vote transfer (correction) | First-past-the-post (FPTP/SMP) + national list-PR | 199 | 2 | semi-proportional | |
| Italy | Chamber of Deputies | Lower house of national legislature | Non-compensatory | 1 (147 single-member districts) 245 (national constituency, seats redistributed into 49 multi-member districts) 8 (Italians abroad constituency) | Superposition | List PR + First-past-the-post (FPTP/SMP) | 400 | 1 (mixed single vote) | semi-proportional | mixed single vote |
| Italy | Senate | Upper house of national legislature | Non-compensatory | 1 (74 single-member districts) varies, cannot be less than 2 (20 regional constituencies, seats redistributed into 26 multi-member districts) 4 (Italians abroad constituency) | Superposition | List PR + First-past-the-post (FPTP/SMP) | 200 | 1 (mixed single vote) | semi-proportional | mixed single vote |
| Japan | House of Representatives | Lower house of national legislature | Non-compensatory | 1 (local districts) | Parallel voting (superposition) | First-past-the-post (FPTP/SMP) and List PR | 465 | 2 | semi-proportional | |
| Japan | House of Councillors | Upper house of national legislature | Non-compensatory | [data missing] | Parallel voting (superposition) | SNTV and List PR | [data missing] | 2 | semi-proportional | |
| Republic of Korea (South Korea) | National Assembly | Unicameral national legislature | Partially compensatory (de jure); Non-compensatory (de facto) | 1 (local districts), 46 additional seats (seat linkage) | Seat linkage system (compensation, de jure); Parallel voting (superposition, de facto) | First-past-the-post (FPTP/SMP) + Party-list PR | 300 | 2 | majoritarian (Note: South Korea uses the first-past-the-post voting system primarily; 84.7% of the country's members of parliament (254 out of 300 MPs) are elected by FPTP. This makes its legislative election procedures and results much more similar to that of elections which use FPTP exclusively than other elections which use mixed systems.) | From 2019 to 2024: supermixed parallel voting (superposition) and additional member system (correction), with 253 single-member constituencies, 17 supplementary seats (a la parallel voting), and 30 compensatory seats (seat linkage) Since 2024 only seat linkage compensatory system, with very few compensatory seats Use of decoy lists by major parties is widespread and mixed-member proportional representation is not to be achieved: de facto mixed-member majoritarian representation |
| Kazakhstan | Majilis | Lower house of national legislature | Non-compensatory | 1 (local districts), 69 (nationwide constituency) | Parallel voting (superposition) | Party-list PR + First-past-the-post (FPTP/SMP) | 98 | 2 | semi-proportional | |
| Lesotho | National Assembly | Lower house of national legislature | Compensatory | 1 (local districts), 40 additional seats (seat linkage) | Seat linkage system (compensation) | Party-list PR + First-past-the-post (FPTP/SMP) | 120 | 1 (mixed single vote) | proportional | |
| Lithuania | Seimas | Unicameral national legislature | Non-compensatory | | Parallel voting (superposition) | TRS and List PR | 141 | 2 | semi-proportional | |
| Mauritania | [data missing] | | | | | | | | | |
| Mexico | Chamber of Deputies | Lower house of national legislature | Partially compensatory | 1 (local districts), 40 (multi-member districts) | Supermixed parallel voting (superposition) and conditional correction | First-past-the-post (FPTP/SMP) + Party-list PR (Largest remainder:Hare quota) | | 2 | semi-proportional | Since 1996, a party cannot get more seats overall than 8% above its result nationally (i.e., to win 50% of the legislative seats, a party must win at least 42% of the vote nationwide). There are three exceptions on this rule: first, a party can only lose PR-seats due to this rule (and no plurality-seats); second, a party can never get more than 300 seats overall (even if it has more than 52% of the vote nationally); and third, a party can exceed this 8% rule if it wins the seats in the single-member districts. |
| Mexico | Chamber of Senators | Upper house of national legislature | Non-compensatory | 3 (local districts), 32 (multi-member districts) | Superposition | Limited (party) block voting locally (2 seats from each constituency to largest party, 1 to the second largest party) + Party-list PR nationwide | | 1 (mixed single vote) | semi-proportional | |
| (Myanmar) Myanmar | Amyotha Hluttaw | Upper house of national legislature | Non-compensatory | 84 (local districts), 14 (multi-member districts) | Parallel voting (superposition) | Party-list PR + First-past-the-post (FPTP/SMP) | | 2 | semi-proportional | |
| Monaco | [data missing] | | | | | | | | | |
| Mongolia | [data missing] | | | | | | | | | |
| Morocco | [data missing] | | | | | | | | | |
| Nepal | House of Representatives | Lower house of national legislature | Non-compensatory | 1 | Parallel voting (superposition) | First-past-the-post (FPTP/SMP) and List PR | 275 | 2 | semi-proportional | |
| New Zealand | House of Representatives | Unicameral national legislature | Compensatory | 1 (local districts), 48 additional seats (seat linkage) + additional seats in case of overhang seats | Seat linkage: mixed member proportional (MMP) | Party-list PR + First-past-the-post (FPTP/SMP) | 120 | 2 | proportional | Following a long electoral reform process, beginning with the Royal Commission on the Electoral System in 1985 and ending with the 1993 referendum on the voting system. It was first used in an election in 1996. The system's use was reviewed by referendum in November 2011, with the majority (56.17%) voting to keep it. In 2020 general election, the Labour Party won 65 out of 120 seats, becoming the first party under MMP to receive a majority. |
| Pakistan | National Assembly | Lower house of national legislature | Non-compensatory | | Superposition, seat linkage non compensatory | First-past-the-post (FPTP/SMP) for 272 seats + 70 members appointed by parties proportional with seats already won | | 1 | majoritarian | |
| Philippines | House of Representatives | Lower house of national legislature | Non-compensatory | 1 (congressional districts), 20% of the total number of HoR seats (party list representatives) | Parallel voting (superposition) | First-past-the-post (FPTP/SMP) (district representatives) + Party-list PR (party-list representatives) | varies | 2 | semi-proportional | Voters vote for 1 district representative and 1 party in the party-list. Party-list votes are tallied nationwide. Parties that get 2% of the vote get 1 party-list representative seat, with a maximum of 3 seats for a party (6% of the votes). If the allocation (20% of total House seats) is not filled by parties with at least 2% of the vote, parties with the next highest votes get 1 seat until the allocation is filled. |
| (Russia) Russian Federation | State Duma | Lower house of national legislature | Non-compensatory | | Parallel voting (superposition) | | | | semi-proportional | |
| San Marino | Grand and General Council | Unicameral national legislature | Non-compensatory | | Majority jackpot | | | | proportional (first round) | |
| Senegal | National Assembly | Lower house of national legislature | Non-compensatory | | | | | | | |
| Seychelles | National Assembly | Unicameral national legislature | Non-compensatory | | | | | | | |
| Sri Lanka | [data missing] | | | | | | | | | |
| Taiwan (Republic of China) | Legislative Yuan | Unicameral national legislature | Non-compensatory | | Parallel voting (superposition) | | | | | |
| Tajikistan | Assembly of Representatives | Lower house of national legislature | Non-compensatory | | Parallel voting (superposition) | | | | | |
| Tanzania | National Assembly | Unicameral national legislature | Non-compensatory | | Parallel voting (superposition) | | | | | |
| Thailand | House of Representatives | Lower house of national legislature | Non-compensatory | | Parallel voting (superposition) | | | 2 | | |
| Venezuela | National Assembly | Unicameral national legislature | Non-compensatory | 1 (local districts), 400 (nationwide constituency) | Parallel voting (superposition) | | | 2 | | |
| Zimbabwe | National Assembly | Lower house of national legislature | Non-compensatory | 1 (local districts), 10 (proportional constituencies) | Superposition | | | 1 | | |

=== Subnational level ===
| Country | Body | Type of body | Type of mixed system | Seats per constituency | Mixed system | Component electoral systems | Total seats | Number of votes | Typical results | Notes |
|---|---|---|---|---|---|---|---|---|---|---|
| Argentina | (Córdoba Province, Argentina) Legislature of Córdoba Province | | Non-compensatory | 1 (local districts), 44 (nationwide constituency) | Parallel voting (superposition) | | 70 | 2 | semi-proportional | |
| Argentina | (Río Negro Province) Legislature of Río Negro Province | | Non-compensatory | | | | | | semi-proportional | [data missing] |
| Argentina | (San Juan Province, Argentina) Legislature of San Juan Province | | Non-compensatory | | | | | | semi-proportional | [data missing] |
| Argentina | (Santa Cruz Province, Argentina) Legislature of Santa Cruz Province | | Non-compensatory | | | | | | semi-proportional | [data missing] |
| (Germany) Germany | State parliaments, except: (Bremen (state)) Bremen, (Hamburg) Hamburg; (Saarland) Saarland | varies by state | Compensatory | varies by state | Mixed-member proportional representation (MMP) - with levelling seats | Party-list PR + First-past-the-post (FPTP/SMP) | varies by state | varies by state | proportional | Bavaria uniquely uses an open-list system for its party-list seats. |
| Philippines | Bangsamoro Parliament | Autonomous regional parliament | Non-compensatory | 1 (Parliamentary Districts), 2 (Non-Moro Indigenous People's Sectoral Representatives), 6 (Other Sectoral Representatives), 40 (Region-wide constituency) | Parallel voting (superposition) | Party-list PR (Regional constituency) + First-past-the-post (FPTP/SMP) (Parliamentary Districts and Other Sectoral Representatives) + Indirect elections (Non-Moro Indigenous People's Sectoral Representatives) | 80 | 3 | semi-proportional | Voters vote for 1 Party (Region-wide Constituency), 1 Local Candidate (Parliamentary District), and 6 Other Sectoral Representatives (2 Settler, 1 Traditional Leader, 1 Youth, 1 Women, 1 Ulama). 2 NMIP Sectoral Representatives elected via a separate conference of Indigenous Leaders conducted before actual election day. |
| South Africa | Municipal elections including: Local municipalities; Metropolitan municipalities | | Compensatory | 1 | MMP with ca. 50% FPTP and 50% seat linkage | Varies by municipality 7 - 270 | | | | Two ballots - one with FPTP candidates (Ward) and the other with just party names (PR). Compensatory seats are based on the sum of both ballots, effectively allocated using the D'Hondt method. |
| (United Kingdom) United Kingdom | (Scotland) Scotland - Scottish Parliament | Devolved legislature | Compensatory | | Additional member system (AMS) | | | semi-proportional | 2 | MMP with each electoral region normally electing 9 local MSPs (with exceptions to 3 regions) and 7 regional MSPs |
| (United Kingdom) United Kingdom | Regional local government elections in (London) London (Assembly) | Municipal | Compensatory | | Additional member system (AMS) | | | semi-proportional | 2 | MMP with 14 constituencies each electing 1 constituency member and the entire region electing 11 additional members. |

=== Former use ===
- Albania used parallel voting in the 1996 and 1997 elections (before switching to mixed-member proportional representation from 2001 to 2005).
- Argentina: Santiago del Estero Province (1997–2009)
- Armenia
- Azerbaijan's National Assembly (the Milli Məclis) had previously used an SM system in which 100 members were elected for five-year terms in single-seat constituencies and 25 were members were elected by proportional representation. Since the latest election Azerbaijan has returned to electing members from single-member constituencies. Due to the corruption present within Azerbaijan, the limited proportionality that SM was able to offer had little effect.
- Bulgaria (1990, 2009)
- Croatia (1993–2001)
- Egypt (2020)
- Georgia (1990–2024): Georgia initially used a two-round system for its constituency seats. Up until 2016, 73 seats out of 150 seats were allocated in constituencies. In the 2020 election, this number was reduced to 30 out of 150 as a result of the 2019 protests. By 2024, Georgia will switch to a fully proportional electoral system.
- Guinea
- Italy (1993–2005, with modifications)
- Kyrgyzstan (until 2025)
- North Macedonia (1998)
- Palestinian Authority (2005), for the next election, the system was changed to party-list proportional representation.
- South Korea: (1988-2024) National Assembly used parallel voting from 1988 to 2019. From 2019 to 2024, it uses a hybrid system of parallel voting and mixed-member proportional, with both compensatory seats (30) and supplementary seats (17).
- Ukraine: In the last elections to the Verkhovna Rada, a parallel voting system was used. 50% of seats are distributed under party lists with a 5% election threshold and 50% through first-past-the-post in single-member constituencies. The method of 50/50 mixed elections was used in the 2002, 2012, 2014 and 2019 elections; however, in 2006 and 2007, the elections were held under a proportional system only. According to the election law that became valid on 1 January 2020 the next election to the Verkhovna Rada again will be held under a proportional scheme.
- Wales (Senedd) until 2026

== See also ==
- Electoral systems
- List of electoral systems by country
- Proportional representation
- Semi-proportional representation
- Representative democracy
- Types of democracy

== Sources ==
- Gallagher, Michael (2011). "Elections and Referendums". In Caramani, Daniele (ed.). Comparative Politics (2nd ed.). Oxford: Oxford University Press. pp. 181–197. ISBN 978-0-19-957497-1.
- ——— (2014). "Electoral Institutions and Representation". In LeDuc, Lawrence; Niemi, Richard G.; Norris, Pippa (eds.). Comparing Democracies: Elections and Voting in a Changing World (4th ed.). SAGE Publications. ISBN 978-1-4739-0508-5.
- Mayorga, René Antonio (2002). "Bolivia: Electoral Reform in Latin America" ( (PDF)). In Reynolds, Andrew; Reilly, Ben (eds.). The International IDEA Handbook of Electoral System Design (2nd ed.). Stockholm: International Institute for Democracy and Electoral Assistance. pp. 79–84. ISBN 978-91-89098-00-8. ISSN 1402-6759. Archived from the original on 24 November 2020.;
- ——— (2003). "Electoral Reform in Bolivia: Origins of the Mixed-Member Proportional System". In Shugart, Matthew Søberg; Wattenberg, Martin P. (eds.). Mixed-Member Electoral Systems: The Best of Both Worlds?. Comparative Politics. Oxford: Oxford University Press. doi:10.1093/019925768X.001.0001. ISBN 978-0-19-925768-3.
