= List of electoral systems by country =

This is a list of electoral systems by country in alphabetical order. An electoral system is used to elect national legislatures and heads of state.

== Maps ==
Head of state	Lower house or unicameral legislature	Upper house
First past the post (FPTP) Two-round system (TRS) Contingent voting, including Instant-runoff voting (IRV) Election by legislature Election by electoral college Not elected (mostly monarchies) In transition No information	Single-member constituencies: First past the post (FPTP) Two-round system (TRS) Instant-runoff voting (IRV) Multi-member constituencies, majoritarian: Block voting (BV) or mixed FPTP and BV Party block voting (PBV) or mixed FPTP and PBV Limited voting Single non-transferable vote (SNTV) or mixed FPTP and SNTV Modified Borda count Multi-member constituencies, proportional: Party-list proportional representation (party-list PR, closed list) Party-list proportional representation (party-list PR, open list for some parties) Party-list proportional representation (party-list PR, open list) Panachage (party-list PR, free list) Semi-mixed-member proportional representation (party-list PR and FPTP seat linkage mixed system, with non-awarding of overhang seats) Single transferable vote Mixed majoritarian and proportional: Mixed-member proportional representation (Seat linkage mixed system) (party-list PR and FPTP) Additional member system (party-list PR and FPTP seat linkage mixed system) (less proportional implementation of MMP) Parallel voting / mixed member majoritarian (party-list PR and FPTP) Parallel voting (party-list PR and TRS) Parallel voting (party-list PR and BV or PBV) Vote linkage mixed system or limited Seat linkage mixed system (party-list PR and FPTP) ((partially compensatory semi-proportional implementation of MMP) (party-list PR and FPTP) Majority bonus system (non-compensatory) Majority jackpot system (compensatory) Two-round majority jackpot system (compensatory) Indirect elections No relevant electoral system information: No elections Varies by state In transition No information	Single-member constituencies: First past the post (FPTP) Two-round system (TRS) Multi-member constituencies, majoritarian: Block voting (BV) or mixed FPTP and BV Party block voting (PBV) or mixed FPTP and PBV Single non-transferable vote (SNTV) or mixed FPTP and SNTV Mixed BV and SNTV Limited voting or cumulative voting Multi-member constituencies, proportional: Party-list proportional representation (party-list PR, closed list) Party-list proportional representation (party-list PR, open list) Party-list proportional representation (party-list PR, partially-open list) Partially party-list proportional representation (party-list PR, closed list) Single transferable vote Mixed majoritarian and proportional: Parallel voting / Mixed-member majoritarian (party-list PR and FPTP) Parallel voting (party-list PR and BV or PBV) Parallel voting (party-list PR and SNTV) Other: Varies by federal states, or constituency Indirect election: Election by electoral college or local/regional legislatures Partly elected by electoral college or local/regional legislatures and appointed by head of state Partly elected by electoral college or local/regional legislatures, partly elected in single-member districts by FPTP, and partly appointed by head of state No relevant electoral system information: No elections Appointed by head of state No information / In transition Unicameral

== Electoral systems by country ==
=== Countries ===
Country	Body or office	Type of body or office	Electoral system	Notes
Afghanistan	Currently no national elections are held			
Albania	President	Head of State	Elected by the Parliament	
Albania	Parliament	Unicameral legislature	Party-list proportional representation	
Algeria	President	Head of State	Two-round system	
Algeria	Council of the Nation	Upper chamber of legislature	Indirectly elected (2/3); Appointed by the President (1/3)	
Algeria	People's National Assembly	Lower chamber of legislature	Party-list proportional representation	
Andorra	Co-Princes	Head of State	Two-round system (French Prince); Appointed by the Pope (Episcopal Prince)	
Andorra	General Council	Unicameral legislature	Mixed-member majoritarian representation: Party-list proportional representation (14 seats); Party block voting (14 seats)	
Angola	President	Head of State and Government	First-past-the-post	
Angola	National Assembly	Unicameral legislature	Party-list proportional representation	
Antigua and Barbuda	King	Head of State	Hereditary monarchy	
Antigua and Barbuda	Senate	Upper chamber of legislature	Appointed by the Governor-General	
Antigua and Barbuda	House of Representatives	Lower chamber of legislature	First-past-the-post	
Argentina	President	Head of State and Government	Two-round system	45% of the vote, or 40% of the vote and a 10% lead over the second candidate to win in first round
Argentina	Senate	Upper chamber of legislature	Limited voting	2 seats to most voted party, 1 seat to second most voted party
Argentina	Chamber of Deputies	Lower chamber of legislature	Party-list proportional representation	
Armenia	President	Head of State	Appointed by the National Assembly	
Armenia	National Assembly	Unicameral legislature	Two-round party-list proportional representation with majority/minority jackpot	If no party gets a majority a runoff will be held between the two most voted parties
Australia	King	Head of State	Hereditary monarchy	
Australia	Senate	Upper chamber of legislature	Single transferable vote	
Australia	House of Representatives	Lower chamber of legislature	Instant-runoff voting	
Austria	President	Head of State	Two-round system	
Austria	Federal Council	Upper chamber of legislature	Appointed by federal states' legislatures	
Austria	National Council	Lower chamber of legislature	Party-list proportional representation	
Azerbaijan	President	Head of State	First-past-the-post	
Azerbaijan	National Assembly	Unicameral legislature	First-past-the-post	
Bahamas	King	Head of State	Hereditary monarchy	
Bahamas	Senate	Upper chamber of legislature	Appointed by the Governor-General	
Bahamas	House of Assembly	Lower chamber of legislature	First-past-the-post	
Bahrain	King	Head of State	Hereditary monarchy	
Bahrain	Consultative Council	Upper chamber of legislature	Appointed by the King	
Bahrain	Council of Representatives	Lower chamber of legislature	Two-round system	
Bangladesh	President	Head of State	Elected by the Jatiya Sangsad	
Bangladesh	Jatiya Sangsad	Unicameral legislature	First-past-the-post (300 seats); Reserved for women (50 seats)	
Barbados	President	Head of State	Elected by the Parliament	
Barbados	Senate	Upper chamber of legislature	Appointed by the President	
Barbados	House of Assembly	Lower chamber of legislature	First-past-the-post	
Belarus	President	Head of State and Government	Two-round system	
Belarus	Council of Republic	Upper chamber of legislature	Elected by regional councils	
Belarus	House of Representatives	Lower chamber of legislature	First-past-the-post	
Belgium	King	Head of State	Hereditary monarchy	
Belgium	Senate	Upper chamber of legislature	Elected by regional parliaments (50 seats); Elected by the Senate (10 seats)	
Belgium	Chamber of Representatives	Lower chamber of legislature	Party-list proportional representation	
Belize	King	Head of State	Hereditary monarchy	
Belize	Senate	Upper chamber of legislature	Appointed by the Governor-General	
Belize	House of Representatives	Lower chamber of legislature	First-past-the-post	
Benin	President	Head of State and Government	Two-round system	
Benin	National Assembly	Unicameral legislature	Party-list proportional representation	
Bhutan	King	Head of State	Hereditary monarchy	
Bhutan	National Council	Upper chamber of legislature	First-past-the-post (20 seats); Appointed by the King (5 seats)	
Bhutan	National Assembly	Lower chamber of legislature	Two-round system	
Bolivia	President	Head of State and Government	Two-round system	50% of the vote, or 40% of the vote and a 10% lead over the second candidate to win in first round
Bolivia	Chamber of Senators	Upper chamber of legislature	Party-list proportional representation	
Bolivia	Chamber of Deputies	Lower chamber of legislature	Mixed-member proportional representation	7 seats are reserved indigenous seats elected by the usos y costumbres.
Bosnia and Herzegovina	Presidency	Heads of State	First-past-the-post	
Bosnia and Herzegovina	House of Peoples	Upper chamber of legislature	Elected by entities legislatures	
Bosnia and Herzegovina	House of Representatives	Lower chamber of legislature	Party-list proportional representation	
Botswana	President	Head of State and Government	Elected by the National Assembly	
Botswana	National Assembly	Unicameral legislature	First-past-the-post	
Brazil	President	Head of State and Government	Two-round system	
Brazil	Senate	Upper chamber of legislature	Staggered terms: Plurality block voting (54 seats, two-seat contests); First-past-the-post (27 seats)	
Brazil	Chamber of Deputies	Lower chamber of legislature	Party-list proportional representation	
Brunei	Currently no national elections are held			
Bulgaria	President	Head of State	Two-round system	
Bulgaria	National Assembly	Unicameral legislature	Party-list proportional representation	
Burkina Faso	Currently no national elections are held			
Burundi	President	Head of State and Government	Two-round system	
Burundi	Senate	Upper chamber of legislature	Elected by communal councilors (36 seats); Appointed by the National Electoral Commission for the Twa (3 seats)	
Burundi	National Assembly	Lower chamber of legislature	Party-list proportional representation	
Cambodia	King	Head of State	Elective monarchy	
Cambodia	Senate	Upper chamber of legislature	Elected by commune councillors (58 sets); Appointed by the King (2 seats); Appointed by the National Assembly (2 seats)	
Cambodia	National Assembly	Lower chamber of legislature	Party-list proportional representation	
Cameroon	President	Head of State and Government	First-past-the-post	
Cameroon	Senate	Upper chamber of legislature	Elected by municipal councils (70 seats); Appointed by the President (30 seats)	
Cameroon	National Assembly	Lower chamber of legislature	First-past-the-post (58 seats); Party-list proportional representation with a conditional majority jackpot (122 seats)	A party receiving over 50% of the vote in a constituency wins all the seats, if no party get over 50% of the vote, the most voted party is wins half the seats.
Canada	King	Head of State	Hereditary monarchy	
Canada	Senate	Upper chamber of legislature	Appointed by the Governor General	
Canada	House of Commons	Lower chamber of legislature	First-past-the-post	
Cape Verde	President	Head of State	Two-round system	
Cape Verde	National Assembly	Unicameral legislature	Party-list proportional representation	
Central African Republic	President	Head of State and Government	Two-round system	
Central African Republic	National Assembly	Unicameral legislature	Two-round system	
Chad	President	Head of State	Two-round system	
Chad	Senate	Upper chamber of legislature	Elected by provincial and communal councils (2/3); Appointed by the President (1/3)	
Chad	National Assembly	Lower chamber of legislature	Mixed-member majoritarian representation: First-past-the-post (83 seats); Party-list proportional representation with majority jackpot system (105 seats)	A party receiving over 50% of the vote in a constituency wins all the seats; if no party wins over 50% of the vote, seats are allocated proportionally.
Chile	President	Head of State and Government	Two-round system	
Chile	Senate	Upper chamber of legislature	Party-list proportional representation	
Chile	Chamber of Deputies	Lower chamber of legislature	Party-list proportional representation	
China	Currently no national elections are held			
Colombia	President	Head of State and Government	Two-round system	
Colombia	Senate	Upper chamber of legislature	Party-list proportional representation	
Colombia	Chamber of Representatives	Lower chamber of legislature	Party-list proportional representation	
Comoros	President	Head of State and Government	Two-round system	
Comoros	Assembly of the Union	Unicameral legislature	Two-round system	
Democratic Republic of the Congo	President	Head of State	First-past-the-post	
Democratic Republic of the Congo	Senate	Upper chamber of legislature	Elected by provincial parliaments (108 seats); Senator for life (variable seats)	
Democratic Republic of the Congo	National Assembly	Lower chamber of legislature	Party-list proportional representation (436 seats); First-past-the-post (64 seats)	
Republic of the Congo	President	Head of State	Two-round system	
Republic of the Congo	Senate	Upper chamber of legislature	Elected by regional councils	
Republic of the Congo	National Assembly	Lower chamber of legislature	Two-round system	
Cook Islands	King	Head of State	Hereditary monarchy	
Cook Islands	Parliament	Unicameral legislature	First-past-the-post	
Costa Rica	President	Head of State and Government	Two-round system	40% of the vote to win in the first round
Costa Rica	Legislative Assembly	Unicameral legislature	Party-list proportional representation	
Croatia	President	Head of State	Two-round system	
Croatia	Parliament	Unicameral legislature	Party-list proportional representation	
Cuba	President	Head of State	Elected by the National Assembly	
Cuba	National Assembly of People's Power	Unicameral legislature	Two-round system	
Cyprus	President	Head of State and Government	Two-round system	
Cyprus	House of Representatives	Unicameral legislature	Party-list proportional representation	
Czech Republic	President	Head of State	Two-round system	
Czech Republic	Senate	Upper chamber of legislature	Two-round system	
Czech Republic	Chamber of Deputies	Unicameral legislature	Party-list proportional representation	
Denmark	King	Head of State	Hereditary monarchy	
Denmark	Folketing	Unicameral legislature	Party-list proportional representation	40 levelling seats allocated based on overall party vote shares.
Djibouti	President	Head of State and Government	Two-round system	
Djibouti	National Assembly	Unicameral legislature	Majority jackpot system with limited party-list proportional representation	80% of seats to the most voted party
Dominica	President	Head of State	Elected by the House of Assembly	
Dominica	House of Assembly	Unicameral legislature	First-past-the-post (21 seats); Elected by the Assembly or appointed by the President (9 seats); Attorney General (1 seat); Speaker (1 seat)	
Dominican Republic	President	Head of State and Government	Two-round system	
Dominican Republic	Senate	Upper chamber of legislature	First-past-the-post	
Dominican Republic	Chamber of Deputies	Lower chamber of legislature	Party-list proportional representation	
East Timor	President	Head of State	Two-round system	
East Timor	Parliament	Unicameral legislature	Party-list proportional representation	
Ecuador	President	Head of State and Government	Two-round system	50% of the vote, or 40% of the vote and a 10% lead over the second candidate to win in first round
Ecuador	National Assembly	Unicameral legislature	Party-list proportional representation	
Egypt	President	Head of State	Two-round system	
Egypt	House of Representatives	Unicameral legislature	Mixed-member majoritarian representation: Two-round system (284 seats); Party-list proportional representation (284 seats); Appointed by the President (28 seats)	
El Salvador	President	Head of State and Government	Two-round system	
El Salvador	Legislative Assembly	Unicameral legislature	Party-list proportional representation	
Equatorial Guinea	President	Head of State and Government	First-past-the-post	
Equatorial Guinea	Senate	Upper chamber of legislature	Party-list proportional representation (55 seats); Appointed by the President (15 seats)	
Equatorial Guinea	Chamber of People's Representatives	Lower chamber of legislature	Party-list proportional representation	
Eritrea	Currently no national elections are held			
Estonia	President	Head of State	Elected by the Riigikogu	
Estonia	Riigikogu	Unicameral legislature	Party-list proportional representation	
Eswatini	Ngwenyama	Head of State	Hereditary monarchy	
Eswatini	Senate	Upper chamber of legislature	Appointed by the Ngwenyama (20 seats); Elected by the House of Assembly (10 seats)	
Eswatini	House of Assembly	Lower chamber of legislature	First-past-the-post	
Ethiopia	President	Head of State	Elected by the Federal Parliamentary Assembly	
Ethiopia	House of Federation	Upper chamber of legislature	Elected by the State Councils	
Ethiopia	House of Peoples' Representatives	Lower chamber of legislature	First-past-the-post	
Fiji	President	Head of State	Elected by the Parliament	
Fiji	Parliament	Unicameral legislature	Party-list proportional representation	
Finland	President	Head of State	Two-round system	
Finland	Parliament	Unicameral legislature	Party-list proportional representation	
France	President	Head of State	Two-round system	
France	Senate	Upper chamber of legislature	Elected by local councillors	
France	National Assembly	Lower chamber of legislature	Two-round system	
Gabon	President	Head of State	Two-round system	
Gabon	Senate	Upper chamber of legislature	Elected by regional councils	
Gabon	National Assembly	Lower chamber of legislature	Two-round system	
Gambia	President	Head of State and Government	First-past-the-post	
Gambia	National Assembly	Unicameral legislature	First-past-the-post (53 seats); Appointed by the President (5 seats)	
Georgia	President	Head of State	Elected by the Electoral College	
Georgia	Parliament	Unicameral legislature	Party-list proportional representation	
Germany	President	Head of State	Elected by the Federal Convention	
Germany	Bundesrat	Upper chamber of legislature	Elected by State Governments	
Germany	Bundestag	Lower chamber of legislature	Mixed-member proportional representation	
Ghana	President	Head of State and Government	Two-round system	
Ghana	Parliament	Unicameral legislature	First-past-the-post	
Greece	President	Head of State	Elected by the Hellenic Parliament	
Greece	Hellenic Parliament	Unicameral legislature	Party-list proportional representation with majority bonus system	
Grenada	King	Head of State	Hereditary monarchy	
Grenada	Senate	Upper chamber of legislature	Appointed by the Governor-General	
Grenada	House of Representatives	Lower chamber of legislature	First-past-the-post	
Guatemala	President	Head of State and Government	Two-round system	
Guatemala	Congress of the Republic	Unicameral legislature	Party-list proportional representation	
Guinea	President	Head of State	Two-round system	
Guinea	Senate	Upper chamber of legislature	Elected by regional and communal councils (2/3); Appointed by the President (1/3)	
Guinea	National Assembly	Lower chamber of legislature	Mixed-member majoritarian representation: Plurality block voting (76 seats); First-past-the-post (21 seats); Party-list proportional representation (49 seats)	
Guinea-Bissau	President	Head of State	Two-round system	
Guinea-Bissau	National People's Assembly	Unicameral legislature	Party-list proportional representation	
Guyana	President	Head of State and Government	First-past-the-post	
Guyana	National Assembly	Unicameral legislature	Party-list proportional representation	
Haiti	President	Head of State	Two-round system	
Haiti	Senate	Upper chamber of legislature	Two-round system	
Haiti	Chamber of Deputies	Lower chamber of legislature	Two-round system	
Honduras	President	Head of State and Government	First-past-the-post	
Honduras	National Congress	Unicameral legislature	Party-list proportional representation	
Hungary	President	Head of State	Elected by the National Assembly	
Hungary	National Assembly	Unicameral legislature	Mixed-member majoritarian representation: First-past-the-post (106 seats); Party-list proportional representation (93 seats)	Combination of partially compensatory system
Iceland	President	Head of State	First-past-the-post	
Iceland	Alþing	Unicameral legislature	Party-list proportional representation	
India	President	Head of State	Elected by the Electoral College	Electoral college consists elected members of the Parliament and state legislative assemblies
India	Rajya Sabha	Upper chamber of legislature	Elected by state legislative assemblies (233 seats); Appointed by the President (12 seats)	
India	Lok Sabha	Lower chamber of legislature	First-past-the-post	
Indonesia	President	Head of State and Government	Two-round system	Some areas use the noken system.
Indonesia	Regional Representative Council	Upper chamber of legislature	Single non-transferable vote	Some areas use the noken system.
Indonesia	People's Representative Council	Lower chamber of legislature	Party-list proportional representation	Some areas use the noken system.
Iran	Supreme Leader	Head of State	Elected by the Assembly of Experts	
Iran	President	Head of Government	Two-round system	
Iran	Islamic Consultative Assembly	Unicameral legislature	Two-round system; Two-round plurality block voting	
Iran	Assembly of Experts	Electoral College	First-past-the-post; Plurality block voting	
Iraq	President	Head of State	Elected by the Council of Representatives	
Iraq	Council of Representatives	Unicameral legislature	Party-list proportional representation	
Ireland	President	Head of State	Instant-runoff voting	
Ireland	Seanad Éireann	Upper chamber of legislature	Elected by vocational panels (43 seats); Appointed by the Taoiseach (11 seats); Elected by the graduates of 2 universities (6 seats)	
Ireland	Dáil Éireann	Lower chamber of legislature	Single transferable vote	
Israel	President	Head of State	Elected by the Knesset	
Israel	Knesset	Unicameral legislature	Party-list proportional representation, with at-large districting	
Italy	President	Head of State	Elected by the Italian Parliament and regional councils	
Italy	Senate	Upper chamber of legislature	Party-list proportional representation with majority jackpot system	55% of seats to the most voted party that wins at least 42% of popular vote; if not, seats are allocated proportionally.
Italy	Chamber of Deputies	Lower chamber of legislature	Party-list proportional representation with majority jackpot system	55% of seats to the most voted party that wins at least 42% of popular vote; if not, seats are allocated proportionally.
Ivory Coast	President	Head of State and Government	Two-round system	
Ivory Coast	Senate	Upper chamber of legislature	Elected by regional councils (66 seats); Appointed by the President (33 seats)	
Ivory Coast	National Assembly	Lower chamber of legislature	First-past-the-post	
Jamaica	King	Head of State	Hereditary monarchy	
Jamaica	Senate	Upper chamber of legislature	Appointed by the Governor-General	
Jamaica	House of Representatives	Lower chamber of legislature	First-past-the-post	
Japan	Emperor	Head of State	Hereditary monarchy	
Japan	House of Councillors	Upper chamber of legislature	Mixed-member majoritarian representation: Single non-transferable vote (148 seats); Party-list proportional representation (100 seats)	
Japan	House of Representatives	Lower chamber of legislature	Mixed-member majoritarian representation: First-past-the-post (289 seats); Party-list proportional representation (176 seats)	
Jordan	King	Head of State	Hereditary monarchy	
Jordan	Senate	Upper chamber of legislature	Appointed by the King	
Jordan	Chamber of Deputies	Lower chamber of legislature	Party-list proportional representation	
Kazakhstan	President	Head of State and Government	Two-round system	
Kazakhstan	Kurultai	Unicameral legislature	Party-list proportional representation	
Kenya	President	Head of State and Government	Two-round system	50% of the vote and 25% of the vote in 24 counties
Kenya	Senate	Upper chamber of legislature	First-past-the-post (47 seats); Appointed (20 seats)	
Kenya	National Assembly	Lower chamber of legislature	First-past-the-post (337 seats); Appointed (12 seats)	
Kiribati	President	Head of State and Government	First-past-the-post	
Kiribati	House of Assembly	Unicameral legislature	Two-round plurality block voting (44 seats); Appointed by the Rabi Council of Leaders (1 seat)	
Kuwait	Emir	Head of State	Hereditary monarchy	
Kuwait	National Assembly	Unicameral legislature	Single non-transferable vote	
Kyrgyzstan	President	Head of State and Government	Two-round system	
Kyrgyzstan	Supreme Council	Unicameral legislature	Single non-transferable vote	
Laos	President	Head of State	Elected by the National Assembly	
Laos	National Assembly	Unicameral legislature	Plurality block voting (in multi-member districts)	
Latvia	President	Head of State	Elected by the Saeima	
Latvia	Saeima	Unicameral legislature	Party-list proportional representation	
Lebanon	President	Head of State	Elected by the Parliament	
Lebanon	Parliament	Unicameral legislature	Party-list proportional representation	
Lesotho	King	Head of State	Hereditary monarchy	
Lesotho	Senate	Upper chamber of legislature	Hereditary tribal chiefs (22 seats); Appointed by the King (11 seats)	
Lesotho	National Assembly	Lower chamber of legislature	Mixed-member proportional representation	
Liberia	President	Head of State and Government	Two-round system	
Liberia	Senate	Upper chamber of legislature	First-past-the-post	
Liberia	House of Representatives	Lower chamber of legislature	First-past-the-post	
Libya	Currently no national elections are held			
Liechtenstein	Prince	Head of State	Hereditary monarchy	
Liechtenstein	Landtag	Unicameral legislature	Party-list proportional representation	
Lithuania	President	Head of State	Two-round system	
Lithuania	Seimas	Unicameral legislature	Mixed-member majoritarian representation: Two-round system (71 seats); Party-list proportional representation (70 seats)	
Luxembourg	Grand Duke	Head of State	Hereditary monarchy	
Luxembourg	Chamber of Deputies	Unicameral legislature	Party-list proportional representation	
Madagascar	President	Head of State	Two-round system	
Madagascar	Senate	Upper chamber of legislature	Elected by the electoral colleges of the provinces (12 seats); Appointed by the President (6 seats)	
Madagascar	National Assembly	Lower chamber of legislature	First-past-the-post (77 seats); Party-list proportional representation (86 seats)	
Malawi	President	Head of State and Government	Two-round system	
Malawi	National Assembly	Unicameral legislature	First-past-the-post	
Malaysia	Yang di-Pertuan Agong	Head of State	Elective monarchy	
Malaysia	Dewan Negara	Upper chamber of legislature	Appointed by the Yang di-Pertuan Agong (44 seats); Elected by the state legislative assemblies (26 seats)	
Malaysia	Dewan Rakyat	Lower chamber of legislature	First-past-the-post	
Maldives	President	Head of State and Government	Two-round system	
Maldives	People's Majlis	Unicameral legislature	First-past-the-post	
Mali	Currently no national elections are held			
Malta	President	Head of State	Elected by the House of Representatives	
Malta	House of Representatives	Unicameral legislature	Single transferable vote	(Note: Up to four supplemental seats sometimes added to ensure majority-vote party has seat majority. Up to 12 supplemental seats sometimes added to ensure each gender has at least 40 percent of seats.)
Marshall Islands	President	Head of State and Government	Elected by the Legislature	
Marshall Islands	Legislature	Unicameral legislature	Plurality block voting	
Mauritania	President	Head of State	Two-round system	
Mauritania	National Assembly	Unicameral legislature	Two-round party block voting (70 seats); Two-round system (18 seats); Party-list proportional representation (37 seats)	
Mauritius	President	Head of State	Elected by the National Assembly	
Mauritius	National Assembly	Unicameral legislature	Plurality block voting (62 seats); Best Loser System (8 seats)	
Mexico	President	Head of State and Government	First-past-the-post	
Mexico	Senate	Upper chamber of legislature	Mixed-member majoritarian representation: Limited voting (96 seats); Party-list proportional representation (32 seats)	Limited voting: 2 seats to most voted party, 1 seat to second most voted party
Mexico	Chamber of Deputies	Unicameral legislature	Mixed-member majoritarian representation: First-past-the-post (300 seats); Party-list proportional representation (200 seats)	A party cannot get more seats overall than 8% above its result nationally. A party can't win more than 300 seats overall.
Micronesia	President	Head of State and Government	Elected by the Congress	
Micronesia	Congress	Unicameral legislature	First-past-the-post	
Moldova	President	Head of State	Two-round system	
Moldova	Parliament	Unicameral legislature	Party-list proportional representation	
Monaco	Prince	Head of State	Hereditary monarchy	
Monaco	National Council	Unicameral legislature	Plurality block voting (16 seats); Party-list proportional representation (8 seats)	
Mongolia	President	Head of State	Two-round system	
Mongolia	State Great Khural	Unicameral legislature	Mixed-member majoritarian representation: Party-list proportional representation (78 seats); Plurality block voting (48 seats)	
Montenegro	President	Head of State	Two-round system	
Montenegro	Parliament	Unicameral legislature	Party-list proportional representation	
Morocco	King	Head of State	Hereditary monarchy	
Morocco	House of Councillors	Upper chamber of legislature	Elected by regions	
Morocco	House of Representatives	Lower chamber of legislature	Party-list proportional representation	
Mozambique	President	Head of State and Government	Two-round system	
Mozambique	Assembly of the Republic	Unicameral legislature	Party-list proportional representation	(Note: 250 members of the Assembly of the Republic are elected by proportional representation in eleven multi-member constituencies based on the country's ten provinces and the capital region, with district magnitude ranging from 14 to 45, and through first-past-the-post voting in two single-member constituencies.)
Myanmar	President	Head of State and Government	Elected by the Presidential Electoral College	
Myanmar	Amyotha Hluttaw	Upper chamber of legislature	Mixed-member majoritarian representation: First-past-the-post (84 seats); Party-list proportional representation (84 seats)	
Myanmar	Pyithu Hluttaw	Lower chamber of legislature	First-past-the-post	
Namibia	President	Head of State and Government	Two-round system	
Namibia	National Council	Upper chamber of legislature	Elected by regional councils	
Namibia	National Assembly	Lower chamber of legislature	Party-list proportional representation (96 seats); Appointed by the President (8 seats)	
Nauru	President	Head of State and Government	Elected by the Parliament	
Nauru	Parliament	Unicameral legislature	Dowdall system	
Nepal	President	Head of State	Electoral college	Electoral college consists of the Parliament and provincial assemblies
Nepal	National Assembly	Upper chamber of legislature	Elected by provincial assemblies	
Nepal	House of Representatives	Lower chamber of legislature	Parallel system: First-past-the-post (165 seats); Party-list proportional representation (110 seats)	
Netherlands	King	Head of State	Hereditary monarchy	
Netherlands	Senate	Upper chamber of legislature	Elected by provincial councils	
Netherlands	House of Representatives	Lower chamber of legislature	Party-list proportional representation with at-large districting	
New Zealand	King	Head of State	Hereditary monarchy	
New Zealand	Parliament	Unicameral legislature	Mixed-member proportional representation	
Nicaragua	President	Head of State and Government	First-past-the-post	
Nicaragua	National Assembly	Unicameral legislature	Party-list proportional representation	
Niger	Currently no national elections are held			
Nigeria	President	Head of State and Government	Two-round system	Most voted and as well as over 25% of the vote in 3/4 of the states to win in first round
Nigeria	Senate	Upper chamber of legislature	First-past-the-post	
Nigeria	House of Representatives	Unicameral legislature	First-past-the-post	
Niue	King	Head of State	Hereditary monarchy	
Niue	Assembly	Unicameral legislature	First-past-the-post (14 seats); Plurality block voting (6 seats)	
North Korea	Supreme People's Assembly	Unicameral legislature	First-past-the-post	
North Macedonia	President	Head of State	Two-round system	
North Macedonia	Assembly	Unicameral legislature	Party-list proportional representation	
Norway	King	Head of State	Hereditary monarchy	
Norway	Storting	Unicameral legislature	Party-list proportional representation	
Oman	Sultan	Head of State and Government	Hereditary monarchy	
Oman	Council of State	Upper chamber of legislature	Appointed by the Sultan	
Oman	Consultative Assembly	Lower chamber of legislature	Single non-transferable vote	
Pakistan	President	Head of State	Elected by the Electoral College	Electoral college consists of the Parliament and provincial assemblies
Pakistan	Senate	Upper chamber of legislature	Elected by the provincial assemblies	
Pakistan	National Assembly	Lower chamber of legislature	First-past-the-post (266 seats); Reserved for women and minorities appointed to parties proportionally to seats already won (70 seats)	
Palau	President	Head of State and Government	Two-round system	
Palau	Senate	Upper chamber of legislature	Plurality block voting	
Palau	House of Delegates	Lower chamber of legislature	First-past-the-post	
Panama	President	Head of State and Government	First-past-the-post	
Panama	National Assembly	Unicameral legislature	Party-list proportional representation (45 seats); First-past-the-post (26 seats)	
Papua New Guinea	King	Head of State	Hereditary monarchy	
Papua New Guinea	National Parliament	Unicameral legislature	Instant runoff voting	
Paraguay	President	Head of State and Government	First-past-the-post	
Paraguay	Senate	Upper chamber of legislature	Party-list proportional representation	
Paraguay	Chamber of Deputies	Lower chamber of legislature	Party-list proportional representation	
Peru	President	Head of State and Government	Two-round system	
Peru	Senate	Upper chamber of legislature	Parallel voting: First-past-the-post (26 seats); Party-list proportional representation (34 seats)	5% national electoral threshold
Peru	Chamber of Deputies	Lower chamber of legislature	Party-list proportional representation	
Philippines	President	Head of State and Government	First-past-the-post	
Philippines	Senate	Upper chamber of legislature	Plurality block voting (plurality at-large voting)	
Philippines	House of Representatives	Lower chamber of legislature	Mixed-member majoritarian representation: First-past-the-post (253 seats); Party-list proportional representation (63 seats)	Party-list PR: No party can wins more than 3 seats.
Poland	President	Head of State	Two-round system	
Poland	Senate	Upper chamber of legislature	First-past-the-post	
Poland	Sejm	Lower chamber of legislature	Party-list proportional representation	
Portugal	President	Head of State	Two-round system	
Portugal	Assembly of the Republic	Unicameral legislature	Party-list proportional representation	
Qatar	Currently no national elections are held			
Romania	President	Head of State	Two-round system	
Romania	Senate	Upper chamber of legislature	Party-list proportional representation	
Romania	Chamber of Deputies	Lower chamber of legislature	Party-list proportional representation	
Russia	President	Head of State	Two-round system	
Russia	Federation Council	Upper chamber of legislature	Elected by federal subjects' legislatures	
Russia	State Duma	Lower chamber of legislature	Mixed-member majoritarian representation: First-past-the-post (225 seats); Party-list proportional representation (225 seats)	
Rwanda	President	Head of State and Government	First-past-the-post	
Rwanda	Senate	Upper chamber of legislature	Elected by provincial councils (12 seats); Appointed by the President (8 seats)	
Rwanda	Chamber of Deputies	Lower chamber of legislature	Party-list proportional representation (53 seats); Elected by local and national councils (27 seats)	
Saint Kitts and Nevis	King	Head of State	Hereditary monarchy	
Saint Kitts and Nevis	National Assembly	Unicameral legislature	First-past-the-post	
Saint Lucia	King	Head of State	Hereditary monarchy	
Saint Lucia	Senate	Upper chamber of legislature	Appointed by the Governor-General	
Saint Lucia	House of Assembly	Lower chamber of legislature	First-past-the-post	
Saint Vincent and the Grenadines	King	Head of State	Hereditary monarchy	
Saint Vincent and the Grenadines	House of Assembly	Unicameral legislature	First-past-the-post (15 seats); Appointed by the Governor-General (6 seats); Attorney General (1 seats); Speaker (1 seats)	
Samoa	O le Ao o le Malo	Head of State	Elected by the Legislative Assembly	
Samoa	Legislative Assembly	Unicameral legislature	First-past-the-post	
San Marino	Captains Regent	Head of State	Elected by the Grand and General Council	
San Marino	Grand and General Council	Unicameral legislature	Two-round party-list proportional representation with a majority jackpot in the second round only.	If no party gets a majority a runoff will be held between the two most voted parties
São Tomé and Príncipe	President	Head of State	Two-round system	
São Tomé and Príncipe	National Assembly	Unicameral legislature	Party-list proportional representation	
Saudi Arabia	Currently no national elections are held			
Senegal	President	Head of State and Government	Two-round system	
Senegal	National Assembly	Unicameral legislature	Mixed-member majoritarian representation: First-past-the-post/Party block voting (112 seats); Party-list proportional representation (53 seats)	
Serbia	President	Head of State	Two-round system	
Serbia	National Assembly	Unicameral legislature	Party-list proportional representation	
Seychelles	President	Head of State and Government	Two-round system	
Seychelles	National Assembly	Unicameral legislature	Mixed-member majoritarian representation: First-past-the-post (26 seats); Party-list proportional representation (up to 10 seats)	Party-list PR: For each 10% of the vote, a party gets one seat.
Sierra Leone	President	Head of State and Government	Two-round system	55% of the vote to win in first round
Sierra Leone	Parliament	Unicameral legislature	Party-list proportional representation (135 seats); Elected for paramount chiefs (14 Seats)	
Singapore	President	Head of State	First-past-the-post	
Singapore	Parliament	Unicameral legislature	Party block voting (82 seats in 18 districts); First-past-the-post (15 seats); Best losers (appointed, up to 12 seats); Nominated Member of Parliament (appointed by the president, up to 9 seats)	
Slovakia	President	Head of State	Two-round system	
Slovakia	National Council	Unicameral legislature	Party-list proportional representation	
Slovenia	President	Head of State	Two-round system	
Slovenia	National Council	Upper chamber of legislature	Elected by groups of experts	
Slovenia	National Assembly	Lower chamber of legislature	Party-list proportional representation	
Solomon Islands	King	Head of State	Hereditary monarchy	
Solomon Islands	National Parliament	Unicameral legislature	First-past-the-post	
Somalia	Currently no national elections are held			
South Africa	President	Head of State and Government	Elected by the National Assembly	
South Africa	National Council of Provinces	Upper chamber of legislature	Elected by the Provinces' Legislatures	
South Africa	National Assembly	Lower chamber of legislature	Party-list proportional representation	
South Korea	President	Head of State and Government	First-past-the-post	
South Korea	National Assembly	Unicameral legislature	Mixed-member majoritarian representation (de facto): First-past-the-post (254 seats); Party-list proportional representation (46 seats)	(Note: South Korea uses the additional member system de jure, but it has been de facto nullified via decoy list usage by major political parties.)
South Sudan	President	Head of State and Government	Two-round system	
South Sudan	Council of States	Upper chamber of legislature	Elected by the state's legislative assembly	
South Sudan	National Legislative Assembly	Lower chamber of legislature	Mixed-member majoritarian representation: First-past-the-post (158 seats); Party-list proportional representation (157 seats); Appointed by the President (17 seats)	
Spain	King	Head of State	Hereditary monarchy	
Spain	Senate	Upper chamber of legislature	plurality block voting (limit on size of party slates, to produce mixed representation) (208 seats); Elected by regional legislatures (57 seats)	
Spain	Congress of Deputies	Lower chamber of legislature	Party-list proportional representation	
Sri Lanka	President	Head of State and Government	Instant-runoff voting	
Sri Lanka	Parliament	Unicameral legislature	Party-list proportional representation	
Sudan	Currently no national elections are held			
Suriname	President	Head of State and Government	Elected by the National Assembly	
Suriname	National Assembly	Unicameral legislature	Party-list proportional representation	
Sweden	King	Head of State	Hereditary monarchy	
Sweden	Riksdag	Unicameral legislature	Party-list proportional representation	
Switzerland	Federal Council	Head of State and Government	Elected by the Federal Assembly	
Switzerland	Council of States	Upper chamber of legislature	Two-round system (41 seats); Party-list proportional representation (4 seats); Landsgemeinde (1 seat)	
Switzerland	National Council	Lower chamber of legislature	Party-list proportional representation	
Syria	Currently no national elections are held			
Taiwan	President	Head of State	First-past-the-post	
Taiwan	Legislative Yuan	Unicameral legislature	Mixed-member majoritarian representation: First-past-the-post (73 seats); Party-list proportional representation (34 seats); Single non-transferable vote (6 seats)	
Tajikistan	President	Head of State and Government	Two-round system	
Tajikistan	National Assembly	Upper chamber of legislature	Elected by deputies of local majlisi (25 seats); Appointed by the President (8 seats)	
Tajikistan	Assembly of Representatives	Lower chamber of legislature	Mixed-member majoritarian representation: Two-round system (41 seats); Party-list proportional representation (22 seats)	
Tanzania	President	Head of State and Government	First-past-the-post	
Tanzania	National Assembly	Unicameral legislature	Mixed-member majoritarian representation: First-past-the-post (264 seats); Party-list proportional representation (113 seats); Appointed by the President (10 seats); Elected by the Zanzibar House of Representatives (5 seats); Attorney General (1 seat)	
Thailand	King	Head of State	Hereditary monarchy	
Thailand	Senate	Upper chamber of legislature	Elected by groups of experts	
Thailand	House of Representatives	Lower chamber of legislature	Mixed-member majoritarian representation: First-past-the-post (400 seats); Party-list proportional representation (100 seats)	
Togo	President	Head of State and Government	Elected by the National Assembly	
Togo	Senate	Upper chamber of legislature	Elected by regional and municipal councils (2/3); Appointed by the President (1/3)	
Togo	National Assembly	Lower chamber of legislature	Party-list proportional representation	
Tonga	King	Head of State	Hereditary monarchy	
Tonga	Legislative Assembly	Unicameral legislature	First-past-the-post	
Trinidad and Tobago	President	Head of State	Elected by all members of the Senate and House of Representatives	
Trinidad and Tobago	Senate	Upper chamber of legislature	Appointed by the President	
Trinidad and Tobago	House of Representatives	Lower chamber of legislature	First-past-the-post	
Tunisia	President	Head of State and Government	Two-round system	
Tunisia	National Council of Regions and Districts	Upper chamber legislature	Elected by the regional and district councils	
Tunisia	Assembly of the Representatives of the People	Lower chamber of legislature	Two-round system	
Turkey	President	Head of State and Government	Two-round system	
Turkey	Grand National Assembly	Unicameral legislature	Party-list proportional representation	
Turkmenistan	President	Head of State and Government	Two-round system	
Turkmenistan	Assembly	Unicameral of legislature	First-past-the-post	
Tuvalu	King	Head of State	Hereditary monarchy	
Tuvalu	Parliament	Unicameral legislature	Plurality block voting	
Uganda	President	Head of State and Government	Two-round system	
Uganda	National Assembly	Unicameral legislature	First-past-the-post	
Ukraine	President	Head of State	Two-round system	
Ukraine	Verkhovna Rada	Unicameral legislature	Party-list proportional representation	
United Arab Emirates	Currently no national elections are held			
United Kingdom	King	Head of State	Hereditary monarchy	
United Kingdom	House of Lords	Upper chamber of legislature	Life peer appointed by the King (729 seats); Lords Spiritual appointed by the Church of England (26 seats)	
United Kingdom	House of Commons	Lower chamber of legislature	First-past-the-post	
United States	President	Head of State and Government	Elected by the Electoral College	The Electoral College is elected by first-past-the-post in all states
United States	Senate	Upper chamber of legislature	First-past-the-post (44 States); Nonpartisan blanket primary (2 States); Two-round system (2 States); Instant-runoff voting (2 States)	
United States	House of Representatives	Lower chamber of legislature	First-past-the-post (44 States); Nonpartisan blanket primary (2 States); Two-round system (2 States); Instant-runoff voting (2 States)	
Uruguay	President	Head of State and Government	Two-round system	
Uruguay	Chamber of Senators	Upper chamber of legislature	Party-list proportional representation	
Uruguay	Chamber of Representatives	Lower chamber of legislature	Party-list proportional representation	
Uzbekistan	President	Head of State and Government	Two-round system	
Uzbekistan	Senate	Upper chamber of legislature	Elected by members of local councils (84 seats); Appointed by the President (16 seats)	
Uzbekistan	Legislative Chamber	Lower chamber of legislature	Mixed-member majoritarian representation: First-past-the-post (75 seats); Party-list proportional representation (75 seats)	
Vanuatu	President	Head of State	Elected by the Parliament and the presidents of Regional Councils	
Vanuatu	Parliament	Unicameral legislature	Single non-transferable vote	
Vatican City	Currently no national elections are held			
Venezuela	President	Head of State and Government	First-past-the-post	
Venezuela	National Assembly	Unicameral legislature	Mixed-member proportional: Party-list proportional representation (65 seats); First-past-the-post (97 seats), three Indigenous seats	
Vietnam	President	Head of State	Elected by the National Assembly	
Vietnam	National Assembly	Unicameral legislature	Plurality block voting	
Yemen	Currently no national elections are held			
Zambia	President	Head of State and Government	Two-round system	
Zambia	National Assembly	Unicameral legislature	Mixed-member majoritarian representation: First-past-the-post (226 seats); Proportional representation (40 seats); Appointed by the President (11 seats); Ex officio members (4 seats)	
Zimbabwe	President	Head of State and Government	Two-round system	
Zimbabwe	Senate	Upper chamber of legislature	Party-list proportional representation (60 seats); Elected by the Council of Chiefs (18 seats); Elected by the National Disability Board (2 seats)	
Zimbabwe	National Assembly	Lower chamber of legislature	Mixed-member majoritarian representation: First-past-the-post (210 seats); Party-list proportional representation (70 seats)	

=== Countries with limited recognition ===
Country	Body or office	Type of body or office	Electoral system	Notes
Abkhazia	President	Head of State	Two-round system	
Abkhazia	People's Assembly	Unicameral legislature	Two-round system	
Kosovo	President	Head of State	Elected by the Assembly	
Kosovo	Assembly	Unicameral legislature	Party-list proportional representation	
Northern Cyprus	President	Head of State	Two-round system	
Northern Cyprus	Assembly of the Republic	Unicameral legislature	Party-list proportional representation	
Palestine	Currently no national elections are held			
Sahrawi Arab Democratic Republic	President	Head of State	Elected by the Congress of the Polisario Front	
Sahrawi Arab Democratic Republic	Sahrawi National Council	Unicameral legislature	Single non-transferable vote	
South Ossetia	President	Head of State	Two-round system	
South Ossetia	Parliament	Unicameral legislature	Mixed-member majoritarian representation: First-past-the-post (17 seats); Party-list proportional representation (17 seats)	
Somaliland	President	Head of State and Government	First-past-the-post	
Somaliland	House of Elders	Upper chamber of legislature	—	Currently no system defined
Somaliland	House of Representatives	Lower chamber of legislature	Party-list proportional representation	
Transnistria	President	Head of State	Two-round system	
Transnistria	Supreme Council	Unicameral legislature	First-past-the-post	

=== Colonies and dependencies ===
Country	Body or office	Type of body or office	Electoral system	Notes
Alderney	States	Unicameral legislature	Plurality block voting	
American Samoa	Senate	Upper chamber of legislature	Elected by county councils	
American Samoa	House of Representatives	Lower chamber of legislature	First-past-the-post (14 seats); Plurality block voting (6 seats)	
Anguilla	House of Assembly	Unicameral legislature	First-past-the-post (7 seats); Plurality block voting (4 seats); Attorney General (1 seats); Deputy Governor (1 seats)	
Ascension	Island Council	Unicameral legislature	Plurality block voting	
Bermuda	Senate	Upper chamber of legislature	Appointed by the Governor	
Bermuda	House of Assembly	Lower chamber of legislature	First-past-the-post	
British Virgin Islands	House of Assembly	Unicameral legislature	First-past-the-post (9 seats); Plurality block voting (4 seats); Attorney General (1 seats); Speaker (1 seats)	
Cayman Islands	Parliament	Unicameral legislature	First-past-the-post	
Falkland Islands	Legislative Assembly	Unicameral legislature	Plurality block voting	
French Polynesia	Assembly	Unicameral legislature	Party-list proportional representation	
Gibraltar	Parliament	Unicameral legislature	Limited plurality block voting	
Guam	Legislature	Unicameral legislature	Plurality block voting	
Guernsey	States of Deliberation	Unicameral legislature	Plurality block voting	
Hong Kong	Legislative Council	Unicameral legislature	Appointed by the Election Committee (40 seats); Elected by functional constituencies (30 seats); Single non-transferable vote (20 seats)	
Isle of Man	Legislative Council	Upper chamber of legislature	Elected by the House of Keys (8 seats); President of Tynwald (1 seat); Bishop of Sodor and Man (1 seat); Attorney General (1 seat)	
Isle of Man	House of Keys	Lower chamber of legislature	Plurality block voting	
Jersey	States Assembly	Unicameral legislature	Plurality block voting (37 seats); First-past-the-post (12 seats)	
Macau	Legislative Assembly	Unicameral legislature	Party-list proportional representation (14 seats); Indirectly elected member (12 seats); appointed by the Chief Executive (7 seats)	
Montserrat	Legislative Assembly	Unicameral legislature	Plurality block voting	
New Caledonia	Congress	Unicameral legislature	Party-list proportional representation	
Northern Mariana Islands	Senate	Upper chamber legislature	Plurality block voting (6 seats); First-past-the-post (3 seats)	
Northern Mariana Islands	House of Representatives	Lower chamber legislature	Plurality block voting (18 seats); First-past-the-post (2 seats)	
Pitcairn Islands	Island Council	Unicameral legislature	Single transferable vote (7 seats); Administrator (1 seat); Governor (1 seat); Deputy Governor (1 seat)	
Puerto Rico	Senate	Upper chamber legislature	Mixed-member majoritarian representation: Plurality block voting (16 seats); Single non-transferable vote (11 seats); Minority jackpot	
Puerto Rico	House of Representatives	Lower chamber legislature	Mixed-member majoritarian representation: First-past-the-post (40 seats); Single non-transferable vote (11 seats); Minority jackpot	
Saint Barthélemy	Territorial Council	Unicameral legislature	Two-round party-list proportional representation with majority bonus system	
Saint Helena	Legislative Council	Unicameral legislature	Plurality block voting (12 seats); Attorney General (1 seat)	
Saint Martin	Territorial Council	Unicameral legislature	Two-round party-list proportional representation with majority bonus system	
Saint Pierre and Miquelon	Territorial Council	Unicameral legislature	Two-round party-list proportional representation with majority bonus system	
Sark	Chief Pleas	Unicameral legislature	Plurality block voting	
Tokelau	General Fono	Unicameral legislature	[data missing]	
Tristan da Cunha	Island Council	Unicameral legislature	Plurality block voting	
Turks and Caicos Islands	House of Assembly	Unicameral legislature	First-past-the-post (10 seats); Plurality block voting (9 seats); Attorney General (1 seats); Speaker (1 seats)	
U.S. Virgin Islands	Legislature	Unicameral legislature	Plurality block voting (14 seats); First-past-the-post (1 seat)	
Wallis and Futuna	Territorial Assembly	Unicameral legislature	Party-list proportional representation	
