= Mixed-member majoritarian representation =

Type of mixed electoral system

Mixed-member majoritarian representation (MMM) is type of a mixed electoral system that combines winner-take-all and proportional methods, where the disproportional results of the members elected by winner-take-all system are dominant over the members elected by the proportional representation system. Mixed member majoritarian systems are therefore also semi-proportional systems, as opposed to mixed-member proportional representation (MMP) which aims to provide proportional representation overall by using compensation ("top-up") seats.

The most common type of MMM system is parallel voting, whereby representatives are voted into a chamber using at least two different systems independently of each other. Most commonly this combines first-past-the-post (single member plurality) voting (FPTP/SMP) with party-list proportional representation (list-PR). The system has been applied in the election of national parliaments as well as local governments in various places such as Taiwan, Lithuania, Russia and Kazakhstan. While FPTP with list-PR is the most common pairing in parallel systems, any other combination is effectively possible. Therefore, not all parallel voting systems are mixed-member majoritarian (and not all MMM systems are parallel or non-compensatory), however as most of them used in practice are, the terms are sometimes used interchangeably.

More unusual types of mixed-member majoritarian system are used in Pakistan, Italy and Hungary, and a de facto MMM system is used in South Korea. (Note: South Korea uses the first-past-the-post voting system primarily; 84.7% of the country's members of parliament (254 out of 300 MPs) are elected by FPTP. This makes its legislative election procedures and results much more similar to that of elections which use FPTP exclusively than other elections which use MMM system.)

== Types ==
According to the academic typology of Massicotte & Blais (1999), mixed-member majoritarian systems can come in the following forms:

- Superposition, or (named supplementary member in New Zealand) system where two different systems are used on different levels of the electoral system in a non-compensatory manner. This means if a party gets a disproportionally high share of seats in the winner-take-all tier, they retain this absolute advantage even as their relative (percentage-wise) advantage may decrease due to a proportional component.
  - Parallel voting is defined by the voter having two votes and there being no interaction between the two (or more) component systems of the election, most often a first-past-the-post vote and a list-PR vote. There are also examples for two-round system and list-PR (Lithuania) or party block voting and list-PR (Andorra).
  - There also exists a single vote version of superposition systems, in which the voter may not split their votes on the different levels of the election, but a single vote automatically determines both the local candidate and the party choice of the voter. Such a system is used in Italy (Rosatellum) for both houses of parliament which disallows vote splitting, thereby effectively using a mixed single vote.
  - In some systems, such as the one used in Pakistan, list PR seats are not distributed based on votes cast, but proportionally with seats already won by the parties using FPTP/SMP. This means the winning parties absolute advantage over other parties increases in terms of seats won, and their relative (percentage-wise) advantage stays the same.
- Fusion, or majority jackpot or majority bonus system (MBS) used in Italy and France for regional elections or where a group of councilors are chosen with a general ticket, and the remaining part by a party-list proportional system, so to ensure that a single list wins well over half the seats.
- Correction or compensation: Although compensation is the basis of mixed proportional (MMP) systems, some countries use systems which have so limited (compensatory) interaction between the local (FPTP/SMP) and national (list-PR) tiers, that in practice it qualifies more as MMM. Certain implementation of the additional-member system can be considered MMM or MMP or in between: proportionality varies based on the results of specific elections. This is especially the case, when a compensatory system is subverted by manipulation intended to negate the correction, which has been the case in multiple countries using MMP./AMS.
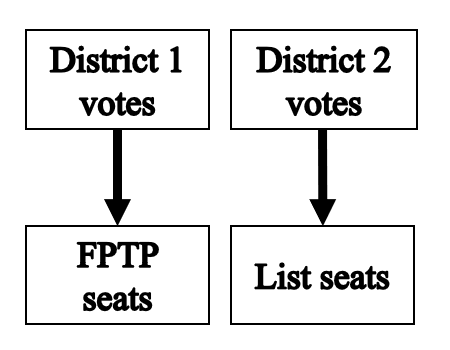
- A diagram of a coexistence based mixed electoral system combining first-past-the-post and party-list proportional representation.
  Coexistence: some type of mixed systems do not have two tiers (and so also use a single vote), but use majoritarian representation in many constituencies (single-member districts) but use proportional representations is some (multi-member districts), which makes the system as a whole mixed-member majoritarian if the winner-take-all districts are not just rare exceptions.
- Supermixed: In Hungary, elections to the National Assembly use the list vote as a parallel system would, but also add unused votes ("fractional votes" of both district winners and losers). In South Korea, list seats are allocated using the additional member system (AMS) de jure, but this system is de facto nullified because of the usage of decoy lists by major parties.

== Advantages and disadvantages ==
=== General ===
Mixed-member majoritarian systems generally allow smaller parties that cannot win individual elections in a winner-take-all system to secure some representation in the legislature; however, unlike in a proportional system, they will have a substantially smaller delegation than their share of the total vote. Some articles argued that MMM does not lead to the degree of political fragmentation found in party systems under forms of proportional representation with no electoral threshold. The two tiers interact through contamination effects to increase political fragmentation.

A criticism of adding a proportional component to winner-take-all electoral systems is that the largest parties are more likely to rely on the support of smaller ones in order to form a government, compared to a two-party system. However, smaller parties are still disadvantaged as the larger parties still predominate. In countries where there is one dominant party and a divided opposition, the proportional seats may be essential for allowing an effective opposition. Furthermore, the likelihood of no governing majority is dependent on many other factors, same as under first-past-the-post. In many democracies, coalition governments are not only the norm, but seen as desirable as the government is formed with wider (indirect) support of the electorate and via compromise between factions.

In parallel voting and other superposition systems, it is sometimes considered a negative, that there are two classes of representatives with one class beholden to their electorate seat, and the other concerned only with their party.

The major critique of MMM systems is that they have lower overall proportionality. Large parties can win very large majorities, disproportionate to their percentage vote. For example, in the 2014 Hungarian election, the Fidesz/KDNP grouping won 133 of 199 Parliamentary seats with 44.87% of the overall vote.

Combined with a high electoral threshold, small parties may still be shut out of representation entirely despite winning a substantial portion of the overall vote. Mixed-member majoritarian representation incentivizes strategic voting so that votes are not wasted. Voters of smaller parties might vote for a large party's constituency candidate, while voters of large parties may vote for allied smaller parties with their party list vote so as to help them over the threshold. An example of this being played out can be seen in the 2014 Japanese election where the government's junior coalition partner, Komeito took only 1.5% in the local constituencies, but 13.7% on the PR list. Most of the Komeito votes came from the ruling Liberal Democratic Party.

=== Compared to mixed member proportional ===
Mixed-member majoritarian (MMM) systems are often contrasted with mixed-Member proportional (MMP) systems. There are a unique set of advantages and disadvantages that apply to this specific comparison.

Under MMM a party that can gerrymander local districts can win more than its share of seats, so parallel systems need fair criteria to draw district boundaries. Normally, under mixed member proportional representation a gerrymander can help a local candidate, but it cannot raise a major party's share of seats, unless the compensatory link is effectively disentangled, for example using decoy lists and tactical voting.

In Japan, an electoral system based on a single-seat constituency system was introduced in 1994 to facilitate a change of government and prevent corruption. It was decided that a portion of the seats would be elected through a proportional representation system to accommodate minority parties. In Japan's political culture, however, this system further reinforced the dominant-party system, and except for a brief period between 2009 and 2012, the opposition parties faced the LDP as a minority force, aided by the proportional representation system. And subsequently Thailand and Russia adopted a parallel system to provide incentives for greater party cohesiveness.

The party is sure to elect the candidates at the top of its list, guaranteeing safe seats for the leadership. By contrast, under the MMP system a party that does well in the local seats might not need or receive any compensatory list seats, so the leadership has to run in the local seats. On the other hand, because of the low reputation of lawmakers elected by proportional representation in Japan, party leaders of major parties are implicitly expected to be elected in their electoral districts. Although political parties can designate the order of the list, it is customary for the order to change according to the percentage of close defeats.

Mixed-member majoritarian systems support the creation of single-party majorities more often than mixed proportional member systems. This may be a positive or a negative depending on the view of the voter.

== Use ==
=== Current use ===
Lower (or only) house of legislature chambers	Upper house of legislature chambers (where applicable)
Countries using mixed-member majoritarian electoral systems.	
	Other
First past the post (FPTP/SMP) + PR seats in proportion to FPTP seats Mixed Party block voting / General ticket (PBV) + FPTP/SMP or FPTP/SMP + majority jackpot (supermixed) Mixed-member majoritarian / parallel voting (FPTP/SMP + party-list PR) Mixed-member majoritarian / parallel voting (TRS + party-list PR) Mixed-member majoritarian / parallel voting (BV or PBV + party-list PR) Mixed-member majoritarian with compensation / scorporo (FPTP/SMP + party-list PR) Majority bonus system (MBS) / Majority jackpot system (PBV + party-list PR)	Varies by federal states or constituencies No direct election No information

Mixed-member majoritarian systems are primarily used in Asian and some of the European states.

Country	Body/region	Last election	Type	(Seats per constituency)	Electoral system	Total seats	Constituencies	Governmental system	Notes
Andorra	General Council	2019	Parallel voting / superposition	2 (local districts) / 14 (nationwide constituency)	Party block voting (PBV) in 14 local districts + List PR in a single nationwide constituency	28	7 parishes, 1 nationwide constituency	Parliamentary system	
Argentina	Legislature of Córdoba Province	2019	Parallel voting / superposition	1 (local districts), 44 (provincewide constituency)	First-past-the-post (FPTP/SMP) and List PR	70	Departments		
Argentina	San Juan Province	2019	Parallel voting / superposition	1 (local districts), 17 (provincewide constituency)	First-past-the-post (FPTP/SMP) and List PR	36	Departments		
Argentina	Santa Cruz Province	2019	Parallel voting / superposition	1 (local districts), 10 (provincewide constituency)	First-past-the-post (FPTP/SMP) and List PR	24	Municipalities		
Cameroon	National Assembly	2020	Hybrid/Supermixed (Conditional+coexistence)	1–7	First-past-the-post (FPTP/SMP) in single-member constituencies, party with over 50% of vote gets all seats in multi-member constituencies (party block voting), otherwise highest party gets half, rest distributed by largest remainder (Hare quota)	180	electoral districts		
Chad	National Assembly	2011	Hybrid/Supermixed (Conditional+coexistence)		First-past-the-post (FPTP/SMP) party with over 50% of vote gets all seats in multi-member constituencies (party block voting), otherwise List PR (largest remainder, closed list)	188	electoral districts		
Democratic Republic of the Congo	National Assembly	2018	Coexistence	1–18	First-past-the-post (FPTP/SMP) in single-member districts and open list in multi-member districts	500	electoral districts		
Djibouti	National Assembly	2018	Majority jackpot (MBS) / fusion	3–28	80% of seats (rounded to the nearest integer) in each constituency are awarded to the party receiving the most votes (party block voting), remaining seats are allocated proportionally to other parties receiving over 10% (closed list, D'Hondt method)	65	regions	Presidential system	
Egypt	House of Representatives	2020	Parallel voting / superposition	1 (local districts), 42–100 (list districts)	Two-round system (TRS) and party block voting (PBV/General ticket)	596 (568 directly elected + 28 appointed)	electoral districts	Semi-presidential system	
Egypt	Senate							Semi-presidential system	
(Georgia (country)) Georgia	Parliament	2020	Parallel voting / superposition	1 (local districts), 120 (national constituency)	Party-list PR (closed list) + First-past-the-post (FPTP/SMP)	150	electoral districts	Parliamentary system	Georgia's Parliament has 150 members, known as deputies, from which 120 members are proportional representatives and 30 are elected through a single-member district plurality system to represent their constituencies. Five parties and electoral blocs had representatives elected to the parliament in the 2008 elections: the United National Movement (governing party), The Joint Opposition, the Christian-Democrats, the Labour Party and Republican Party. Due to the large amount of support given to the ruling party the disproportionality of the 2008 election was very low (1.32 on the Gallagher Index).
(Greece) Greece	Hellenic Parliament	2019	Majority bonus (MBS) / fusion						
Guinea	National Assembly	2020	Parallel voting / superposition	1 (local districts), 76 (national constituency)	Party-list PR (Hare quota) for 76 seats + First-past-the-post (FPTP/SMP) for 38 seats	114	single-member constituencies based on the 33 prefectures and five communes of Conakry		
Hungary	National Assembly (Országgyűlés)	2026	Hybrid/Supermixed (superposition+correction)	1 (local districts), 93 (national constituency)	First-past-the-post (FPTP/SMP) for 106 seats + national List PR for 93 seats (combination of parallel and positive vote transfer)	199	local electoral districts within country/capital borders and a single nationwide constituency that includes non-resident with Hungarian citizenship as well	Parliamentary system	Hungary's National Assembly uses a system where the parallel voting component shares a pool of seats (93) with the compensatory vote transfer system and with the minority list seats with a reduced entry threshold. This means, the number of seats effectively assigned proportionally based on the parallel party list votes is unknown/unknowable before the election takes place. Before the 2014, a different mixed system was used with a two-round system in single-member districts.
Italy	Chamber of Deputies	2018	Superposition	1 (local districts), 12 (Italians abroad constituency), ?-? (multi-member districts)	List PR + First-past-the-post (FPTP/SMP) - mixed single vote	630	electoral districts	Parliamentary system	Starting with the 2018 election, both houses of the Italian parliament are elected using a system similar to parallel voting. 62.5% of the seats are assigned proportionally to party lists; party lists are also linked in coalitions supporting constituency candidates running for the remaining 37.5% of the available seats, who are elected by means of a first-past-the-post system. Electors have a single vote with two-fold proportional effects for a party list and its associated coalition candidate (split-ticket voting is not allowed). Between 1993 and 2005 scorporo, parallel voting with modifications (negative vote transfer compensation) was used.
Italy	Senate	2018	Superposition	1 (local districts), 6 (Italians abroad constituency), ?-? (multi-member districts)	List PR + First-past-the-post (FPTP/SMP) - mixed single vote	315	electoral districts	Parliamentary system	
Japan	House of Representatives	2026	Parallel voting / superposition	1 (local districts), 11 (multi-member districts)	Party-list PR (open list) for 176 seats + First-past-the-post (FPTP/SMP) for 289 seats	465	electoral districts	Parliamentary system	
Republic of Korea (South Korea)	National Assembly	2024	Parallel voting / superposition (de facto)	1 (local districts), 46 (nationwide constituency)	First-past-the-post (FPTP/SMP) for 254 seats + List PR (closed list) for 46 seats (de facto)	300	electoral districts	Presidential system	South Korea's National Assembly used mixed single voting from 1988 to 2001 and parallel voting from 2001 to 2019. Between 2019 and 2024, it nominally used a hybrid system of parallel voting and semi-mixed-member proportional, with both compensatory seats (30) and supplementary seats (17) but this system was de facto nullified because of the usage of decoy lists by major parties. Since 2024, it has used semi-mixed-member proportional, with 46 compensatory seats but this has been de facto nullified again via decoy list usage by major parties.
Kazakhstan	Mäjilis	2023	Parallel voting / superposition	1 (local districts), 69 (national constituency)	Party-list PR (closed list) for 69 seats + First-past-the-post (FPTP/SMP) for 29 seats	98	electoral districts	Semi-presidential system	The Kazakhstan Parliament has two chambers: the Assembly and the Senate. The Assembly (Mäjilis) has 98 seats, 29 of these are constituency seats and 69 list seats determined by proportional representation.
Kyrgyzstan	Supreme Council	2021	Parallel voting / superposition	1 (local districts), 54 (nationwide constituency)	Party-list PR (open list) for 54 seats + First-past-the-post (FPTP/SMP) for 36 seats	90	electoral districts	Presidential system	
Lithuania	Seimas	2020	Parallel voting / superposition	1 (local districts), 70 (nationwide constituency)	Two-round system (TRS) for 71 seats + List PR (Largest remainder) for 70 seats	141	electoral districts	Semi-presidential system	
Madagascar	National Assembly	2019	Coexistence	1–2	First-past-the-post (FPTP/SMP) in 87 single-member districts, party-list PR (Closed list, highest averages method) in 32 two-member districts (64 seats in binomial system)	151	electoral districts	Semi-presidential system	
Mauritania	National Assembly	2018	Hybrid/Supermixed (coexistense+superposition)	1–3 (local districts), 40 (nationwide constituency)	Two-round system (TRS) in single-member districts, two-round block voting (BV) in dual-member districts, and List PR (simple quota largest remainder; closed-list) in larger districts + twice 20 nationally List PR (one set of 20 reserved for women)	157	electoral districts	Semi-presidential system	
(Mexico) Mexico	Chamber of Deputies	2024	Parallel voting / superposition	1 (local districts), 40 (multi-member districts)	First-past-the-post (FPTP/SMP) + Party-list PR (Largest remainder: Hare quota)	500	the local (single-member) districts are called federal electoral districts (with each state divided into at least two districts), and the remaining seats are assigned through rules of proportional representation in 5 multi-state, 40-seat constituencies.	Presidential system	Since 1996, a party cannot win more seats overall than 8% above its national result (i.e., to win 50% of the legislative seats, a party must win at least 42% of the vote nationwide). There are three exceptions to this rule: first, a party can only lose PR seats due to this rule (and no plurality seats); second, a party can never get more than 300 seats overall (even if it has more than 52% of the vote nationally); and third, a party can exceed this 8% rule if it wins the seats in the single-member districts.
(Mexico) Mexico	Senate of the Republic	2024	Superposition	3 (local districts), 32 (multi-member districts)	Superposition using a single party vote: Limited (party) block voting locally (2 seats from each constituency to largest party, 1 to the second largest party) + Party-list PR nationwide	128	three-seat constituencies corresponding to the nation's 31 states and Mexico City (the former Federal District, which is the national capital) and a nationwide electoral district	Presidential system	
Monaco	National Council	2018	Superposition	24 (nationwide constituency)	Mixed-member majoritarian (MMM) using a single (panachage) ballot: Plurality block voting (BV) in single nationwide constituency for 16 seats; D'Hondt method (8 seats)	24	single nationwide constituency	Parliamentary system	
(Nepal) Nepal	House of Representatives	2022	Parallel voting / superposition	1 (local districts), 110 (multi-member districts)	First-past-the-post (FPTP/SMP) for 165 seats + Party-list PR (closed lists) for 110 seats	275	electoral districts and a single nationwide constituency	Parliamentary system	
Panama	National Assembly	2019	Coexistence		First-past-the-post (FPTP/SMP) in single-member districts, Saripolo or Sartori method (Largest remainder, but remainders only for those with no seats) in multi-member districts	71	electoral districts	Presidential system	
Pakistan	National Assembly	2018	Superposition	1 (local districts), 60 (seats reserved for women), 10 (seats reserved for religious minorities)	First-past-the-post (FPTP/SMP) for 272 seats + 70 members appointed by parties proportional with seats already won	342	electoral districts	Parliamentary system	
Philippines	House of Representatives	2025	Parallel voting / superposition	1 (local districts), 63 (nationwide constituency)	First-past-the-post (FPTP/SMP) in single-member districts for 254 seats + List PR (closed lists; modified Hare quota with 3-seat cap and no remainders) for 63 seats	317	electoral districts	Presidential system	The Philippines' electoral system for Congress is an exceptional case on this list. Political parties running for party-list seats are legally required to be completely separate from those running in constituency seats. Furthermore, political parties are capped at 3 seats (out of 61). As a result, the mixed-member system utilized in the Philippines is not representative at all of the share of the vote that "normal" political parties obtain (even amongst mixed-member majoritarian systems), let alone for those in full proportional representation systems.
(Russia) Russian Federation	State Duma	2021	Parallel voting / superposition		First-past-the-post (FPTP/SMP) for 225 seats + Party-list PR for 225 seats	450	electoral districts	Semi-presidential system	
San Marino	Grand and General Council	2019	Majority jackpot / fusion		Majority jackpot system (35 seat jackpot)				
Senegal	National Assembly	2017	Parallel voting / superposition	1–? (local districts), 60 (nationwide constituency)	First-past-the-post (FPTP/SMP) in single-member districts and Plurality block voting (BV) in two-seat districts for 115 seats in total (including overseas) + List PR for 60 seats (largest remainder method)	165	single- or multi-member constituencies based on the 35 departments, with an additional 15 elected by overseas voters and a single nationwide constituency	Presidential system	
Seychelles	National Assembly	2025	Superposition	1 (local districts), up to 10 (nationwide constituency)	First-past-the-post (FPTP/SMP) for 26 seats + up to a further ten are elected based on the percentage of votes received by each party; for each 10% of the total national vote received, a party gets one additional sea (List PR) for 8 seats	34 (currently, may vary based on election results)	single member constituencies and a single nationwide constituency	Presidential system	
South Ossetia	Parliament	2024	Parallel voting / superposition	1 (local districts), up to 17 (nationwide constituency)	First-past-the-post (FPTP/SMP) for 17 seats + List PR for 17 seats	34	single member constituencies and a single nationwide constituency		
South Sudan	Legislative Assembly	2010	Parallel voting / superposition	1–? (local districts), 43 (seats reserved for women), 25 (unreserved seats)	First-past-the-post (FPTP/SMP) for 102 seats + List PR for 68 seats (? method, closed list)	170	10 states and a single nationalwide constituency		
Sudan	National Assembly	2015	Parallel voting / superposition	1–26 (local districts), 128 (seats reserved for women), 85 (unreserved seats)	Plurality block voting (BV) in multi-member districts for 213 seats + List PR for 213 seats (? method, closed list)	426	18 states and a single nationwide constituency		
Taiwan (Republic of China)	Legislative Yuan	2024	Parallel voting / superposition	1 (local districts), 6 (seats reserved for indigenous), 34 (nationwide constituency)	First-past-the-post (FPTP/SMP) for 73 seats, single non-transferable vote for 6 seats reserved for indigenous + List PR for 34 seats	113	electoral districts and a single nationwide constituency	Semi-presidential system	
Tajikistan	Assembly of Representatives	2025	Parallel voting / superposition	1 (local districts), 22 (nationwide constituency)	Two-round system (TRS) for 41 seats + List PR for 22 seats	63	electoral districts and a single nationwide constituency	Presidential system	
Tanzania	National Assembly	2025	Parallel voting / superposition	1 (local districts), 75 (nationwide constituency)	First-past-the-post (FPTP/SMP) for 272 seats + List PR for 115 seats reserved for women	403 (387 directly elected)			
Thailand	House of Representatives	2026	Parallel voting / superposition	1 (local districts), 400 (nationwide constituency)	First-past-the-post (FPTP/SMP) for 400 seats + List PR for 100 seats	500	electoral districts and a single nationwide constituency	Parliamentary system	
Venezuela	National Assembly	2025	Parallel voting / superposition		First-past-the-post (FPTP/SMP) for 136 seats + list PR for 149 seats	285	electoral districts	Presidential system	
Zimbabwe	National Assembly	2023	Superposition	1 (local districts), 10 (proportional constituencies)	210 seats by first-past-the-post (FPTP/SMP) in local districts + 60 seats reserved for women by Party-list PR + 10 seats reserved for youths by Party-list PR	280	electoral districts	Presidential system	Voters cast a single vote
(Zambia) Zambia	National Assembly	2026	Parallel voting / superposition	1 (local districts), 20,15,5 (proportional constituencies)	226 seats by first-past-the-post (FPTP/SMP) in local districts + 40 seats by Party-list PR + 14 seats appointed	278	electoral districts	Presidential system	Votes cast for the president are used as party-list vote (DSV)

=== Former use ===
Countries that replaced mixed majoritarian representation before 1990 are not (yet) included.

Country	Legislative body	Last use	Type of winner-take-all system	Mixed majoritarian electoral system (old system)	Replaced by (new system)	Notes
(Albania) Albania	Parliament	1997	Parallel voting / superposition	First-past-the-post (FPTP/SMP) and list PR	Mixed-member proportional (MMP)	Albania used parallel voting in the 1996 and 1997 elections (before switching to mixed-member proportional representation from 2001 to 2005).
Armenia	National Assembly	2012	Parallel voting / superposition	First-past-the-post (FPTP/SMP) and list PR	Party-list proportional representation (List PR)	
(Azerbaijan) Azerbaijan	National Assembly		Parallel voting / superposition	First-past-the-post (FPTP/SMP) and list PR		Azerbaijan's National Assembly used an SM system in which 100 members were elected for five-year terms in single-seat constituencies and 25 were members were elected by proportional representation. Since 2020 it uses FPTP.
Bulgaria	National Assembly	1990, 2009	Parallel voting / superposition	First-past-the-post (FPTP/SMP) and list PR	Party-list proportional representation (List PR)	
Croatia	Parliament	1995	Parallel voting / superposition	First-past-the-post (FPTP/SMP) and list PR	Party-list proportional representation (List PR)	Used between 1993 and 2001
Egypt	House of Representatives	2020				
(Georgia (country)) Georgia	Parliament	2020	Parallel voting / superposition	1 (local districts), 120 (national constituency)	Party-list PR (closed list) + First-past-the-post (FPTP/SMP)	
Kyrgyzstan	Supreme Council	2021	Parallel voting / superposition	1 (local districts), 54 (nationwide constituency)	Party-list PR (open list) for 54 seats + First-past-the-post (FPTP/SMP) for 36 seats	
Jordan	House of Representatives	2013	Parallel voting / superposition		Party-list proportional representation (List PR)	
Moldova	Parliament	2018	Parallel voting / superposition		Party-list proportional representation (List PR)	
North Macedonia	Assembly	1994	Parallel voting / superposition		Party-list proportional representation (List PR)	
Palestine	Legislative Council	2006	Parallel voting / superposition		Party-list proportional representation (List PR)	For the next election (which is still yet to be held) the system was changed to party-list proportional representation.
Timor-Leste (in former East Timor)	Constituent Assembly	2001	Parallel voting / superposition		Party-list proportional representation (List PR)	
Tunisia	Chamber of Deputies	2009	Parallel voting / superposition		Party-list proportional representation (List PR)	
Ukraine	Verkhovna Rada	2019	Parallel voting / superposition	First-past-the-post (FPTP/SMP) and list PR	Party-list proportional representation (List PR)	According to the election law that became valid on 1 January 2020 the 2023 Ukrainian parliamentary election will be held under a proportional scheme.
Ukraine	Verkhovna Rada	2002	Parallel voting / superposition	First-past-the-post (FPTP/SMP) and list PR	Party-list proportional representation (List PR)	1994 election was held under a two-round system

- Santiago del Estero Province, Argentina (1997–2009)

=== Proposals for use ===
In New Zealand, the Royal Commission on the Electoral System reviewed the electoral system in 1985–86 and considered SM to be a possible replacement for plurality voting, which was in use at the time. They suggested the 'supplementary member system' could be implemented in New Zealand with the following features: each elector would have 2 votes, 1 for a constituency candidate and the other for a party list; there would be a total of 120 seats, with 90 seats determined by votes in constituencies and the remaining 30 from party lists; a modified Sainte-Laguë method would be used to allocate list seats proportionate to a party's total share of votes, a threshold of 5% was suggested before parties could be allocated seats.

The commission came to the conclusion that SM would be unable to overcome the shortcomings of New Zealand's previous plurality electoral system (FPP). The total seats won by a party would likely remain out of proportion to its share of votes—there would be a “considerable imbalance between share of the votes and share of the total seats”—and would be unfair to minor parties (who struggle to win constituency seats). In the indicative 1992 electoral referendum, SM was one of the four choices of alternative electoral system (alongside MMP, AV and STV), but came last with only 5.5 percent of the vote. By clear majority, a change to MMP was favoured, as recommended by the Royal Commission, and was subsequently adopted after the 1993 electoral referendum.

In another referendum in 2011, 57.77% of voters elected to keep current the MMP system. Among the 42.23% that voted to change to another system, a plurality (46.66%) preferred a return to the pre-1994 plurality electoral system (also known as First-past-the-post, FPTP). 'Supplementary member' was the second-most popular choice, with 24.14% of the vote.

== Sources ==
- Gallagher, Michael (2011). "Elections and Referendums". In Caramani, Daniele (ed.). Comparative Politics (2nd ed.). Oxford: Oxford University Press. pp. 181–197. ISBN 978-0-19-957497-1.
- ——— (2014). "Electoral Institutions and Representation". In LeDuc, Lawrence; Niemi, Richard G.; Norris, Pippa (eds.). Comparing Democracies: Elections and Voting in a Changing World (4th ed.). SAGE Publications. ISBN 978-1-4739-0508-5.
- Massicotte, Louis; Blais, André (1999). "Mixed electoral systems: a conceptual and empirical survey". Electoral Studies. 18: 341–366.
