= Coexistence (electoral systems) =

Use of different electoral systems in different districts

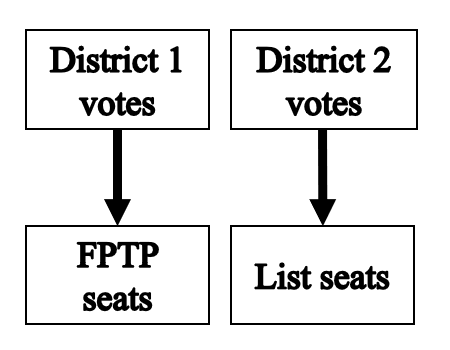
A diagram of a coexistence based mixed electoral system combining first-past-the-post and party-list proportional representation

In political science, coexistence involves different voters using different electoral systems depending on which electoral district they belong to. This is distinct from other mixed electoral systems that use parallel voting (superposition) or compensatory voting. For example, the rural-urban proportional (RUP) proposal for British Columbia involved the use of a fully proportional system of list-PR or STV in urban regions, combined with MMP in rural regions.

Coexistence of electoral systems exist in multiple countries, like the Democratic Republic of the Congo and Panama, as well as for elections of the European Parliament. Historically, variants have been used in Iceland (1946–1959), Niger (1993, 1995) and Madagascar (1998).

== Types of coexistence ==
Type	System	Example(s) for use
Coexistence	e.g. FPTP/SMP in single-member districts, list-PR in multi-member districts	Democratic Republic of the Congo, Panama
Supermixed	e.g. FPTP/SMP in single-member districts, conditional party block voting in multi-member districts	Cameroon, Chad
Supermixed	Rural-urban proportional representation (RUP)	Denmark (formerly), Iceland (formerly)
Supermixed	Seat linkage compensatory mixed system (MMP) and FPTP in special constituencies	Bolivia

== History ==
=== Canada ===
Alberta and Manitoba used STV in major cities and single-member ridings in rural areas to elect provincial members of the Legislative Assembly (MLAs) for 30 years.

=== Denmark ===
A coexistence-based supermixed system was used in the 1918 Danish Folketing election: in Copenhagen, MPs were elected by proportional representation in a single tier; outside of Copenhagen, most MPs were elected via first-past-the-post voting in single-member constituencies, and there were also 20 regional leveling seats which were intended to make the results more proportional, in addition to three national levelling seats.

=== Iceland ===
Iceland employed a rural–urban proportional system similar to the Danish one between 1946 and June 1959. Under that system, twenty-one members of the Althing were elected in single-member constituencies via first-past-the-post voting, while the remainder were elected using D'Hondt method proportional representation: twelve members in two-member constituencies and eight members in Reykjavík, as well as eleven members elected for nationwide leveling seats.

== Rural-urban proportional representation ==
Rural–urban proportional representation (RUP) is a supermixed electoral system which combines the use of single- and multi-member constituencies in a lower tier (coexistence) and top-up seats in an upper tier to meet the different needs of both rural and urban areas, while protecting the objective of proportionality. The term was coined by Fair Vote Canada, which devised a rural–urban system with the intention of meeting the special challenges of Canada's geography, which includes wide-flung, sparsely populated areas.

Rural–urban proportional systems were first devised in Denmark and Iceland; Denmark's implementation used party-list proportional representation in urban areas, and a combination of first-past-the-post voting and regional leveling seats (which functioned similar to a mixed-member proportional system) in semi-urban and rural areas, alongside nationwide levelling seats; while Iceland's used party-list proportional representation in urban and semi-urban areas, pure first-past-the-post voting in rural areas, and nationwide leveling seats.

A version of rural–urban proportional was proposed in 2018 as one of three systems which could have been adopted in British Columbia if voters had decided to adopt a proportional voting system in a 2018 referendum in the province. This version of rural–urban proportional would have used single transferable vote (STV) in urban and semi-urban areas and mixed-member proportional representation (MMP) in rural areas.

== See also ==
- Mixed-member majoritarian representation
- Majority bonus
- Parallel voting
- Elections to the European Parliament
