= Elections in Armenia =

Armenia has a multi-party system. After the 2015 Armenian constitutional referendum, only a legislature is elected on the national level.

== Electoral system of the National Assembly ==
The National Assembly consists of at least 101 seats. Following electoral system amendments introduced in April 2021, members of parliament are elected only through closed party lists by party list proportional representation method modified by a minority jackpot and optional second round with a majority jackpot.

Four mandates are reserved for national minorities, provided they are included in corresponding section of party lists. Any top segment of a party list can not include over 70% of representatives of the same sex.

Parties need to pass a 5% threshold, while alliances (blocs) must pass 7% to be included in mandate distribution.

If neither party wins over 50% of mandates in the first round and no coalition with sufficient mandates is established within 6 days after the election results are announced, a second round of elections will be carried out on 28th day from the first round of voting. The two best-performing political forces are allowed to participate in the second round. All mandates received following the first round will be preserved. The party (or a newly formed coalition) which wins the second round of elections will be given additional number of mandates (as part of a majority jackpot, which is a conditional and flexible version of the majority bonus in this case) to reach 54% of all seats (provided the newly formed coalition does not already have over 54% of mandates from the results of the first round).

If any party or bloc wins over 2/3 of mandates, sufficient additional mandates are distributed among all other political forces represented in the parliament to ensure that at least 1/3 of all seats are held by forces other than the winning one (minority jackpot).

Since the requirement of assignment of 1/3 of all mandates to non-ruling parties is stipulated by the Constitution, some argue, that when withdrawal of oppositional MPs leads to violation of that rule, the ruling party shall be forced to call new snap elections. This is however, not a consensus opinion and could be dealt with in Constitutional Court.

Due to additional seats given either to the winning political force or other ones, the total number of seats in the National Assembly can grow above the minimal count and even exceed 200 in rare circumstances.

== Latest presidential elections ==
Candidate	Party	First round		Second round	
Candidate	Party	Votes	%	Votes	%
Vahagn Khachaturyan	Independent	69	100.00	71	100.00
Against		0	0.00	0	0.00
Total		69	100.00	71	100.00

== Latest local elections ==
- 2023 Yerevan city council elections
- 2018 Yerevan city council elections
- 2017 Yerevan city council elections

== See also ==
- Central Electoral Commission of Armenia
- Elections in Artsakh
- Electoral calendar
- Electoral system
- List of political parties in Armenia
- Politics in Armenia
- Programs of political parties in Armenia
