= Elections in South Sudan =

South Sudan has never had a national election. However the most recent sub-national election was in 2010 for the presidency of the regional government of Southern Sudan and for the bicameral, 170-member Legislative Assembly.

Voting Age limit is 18 years old and above.

== Latest elections ==
=== President ===
Candidate	Party	Votes	%
Salva Kiir	Sudan People's Liberation Movement	2,616,613	92.99
Lam Akol	Sudan People's Liberation Movement–Democratic Change	197,217	7.01
Total		2,813,830	100.00
Total votes		2,813,830	–
Registered voters/turnout		4,539,835	61.98
Source: National Electoral Commission

=== Legislative Assembly ===
Party	Votes	%	Seats
Sudan People's Liberation Movement			161
Sudan People's Liberation Movement–Democratic Change			1
National Congress Party			1
Independents			7
Total			170
Registered voters/turnout	4,539,835	–	
Source: National Electoral Commission

== Independence referendum ==
In 2010, the 2011 South Sudanese independence referendum was held resulting in a strong majority in favour of independence. This was despite difficulties and irregularities.

== See also ==
- 2027 South Sudanese general election
