= Michael Gallagher (academic) =

Irish political scientist

Michael Gallagher (born 1951) is a political scientist. He is a professor emeritus, with a focus on comparative politics. He was three times head of the Department of Political Science at Trinity College Dublin.

== Education ==
Trained as a computer scientist, Gallagher combines his understanding of statistical analysis with his interests in politics. He holds a B.A. from Lancaster, and two M.Sc. degrees, one from Essex and one from Strathclyde. He completed his Ph.D. at the University of Strathclyde.

== Career ==
Gallagher created the Gallagher index, a least squares index of proportional representation that measures an electoral system’s disproportionality between votes received and seats allotted in a legislature. His research interests include Irish politics, comparative political institutions, and political parties.

Gallagher is the author, co-author or editor of eighteen books, including The Politics of Electoral Systems (2005, co-edited with Paul Mitchell), Politics in the Republic of Ireland (4th ed., 2005, co-edited with John Coakley), and Representative Government in Modern Europe (4th ed., 2006, co-edited with Michael Laver and Peter Mair), which are standard textbooks in their fields. He has also written around 70 journal articles and book chapters (his most cited independent work is "Proportionality, Disproportionality and Electoral Systems" in Electoral Studies [1991]), and serves on the editorial boards of various journals in the discipline, including Electoral Studies, European Journal of Political Research, Representation, Party Politics and Irish Political Studies. Gallagher was president of the Political Studies Association of Ireland, from 1994 to 1996.

== Works ==
- How Ireland Voted 2020: The End of an Era (Palgrave Macmillan, 2021)
- How Ireland Voted 2016: the election that nobody won (Basingstoke, 2016)
- How Ireland Voted 2011: the full story of Ireland's earthquake election (Basingstoke, 2011)
- Representative Government in Modern Europe, 5th ed (Maidenhead, 2011)
- Politics in the Republic of Ireland, 5th ed (London, 2010)
- Irish Elections 1948–77: results and analysis (Routledge and PSAI Press, 2009)
- The Politics of Electoral Systems, paperback edition (Oxford, 2008)
- How Ireland Voted 2007 (Palgrave, 2008)
- How Ireland Voted 2007 (Basingstoke, 2008); including chapter on betting and the election
- Gallagher, Michael; Mair, Peter; Laver, Michael, eds. (2005). Representative Government in Modern Europe. McGraw Hill. ISBN 0-07-297706-X. Archived from the original on 3 March 2016.
- Gallagher, Michael; Mitchell, Paul, eds. (2005). The Politics of Electoral Systems. OUP. doi:10.1093/0199257566.001.0001. ISBN 9780191603280.
- Gallagher, Michael; Coakley, John, eds. (2004). Politics in the Republic of Ireland. Routledge. ISBN 0-415-28066-4.
- How Ireland Voted 2002 (Palgrave, 2003)
- Michael Gallagher, Michael Marsh and Paul Mitchell (2003). How Ireland Voted 2002. Routledge. ISBN 0-333-96835-2.
- Michael Gallagher and Michael Marsh (2002). Days of Blue Loyalty: the politics of membership of the Fine Gael party. Routledge. ISBN 0-9519748-6-6.
- Gallagher, Michael; Uleri, Pier Vincenzo, eds. (1996). The Referendum Experience in Europe. Palgrave Macmillan. ISBN 0-333-67018-3.
- Michael Gallagher, ed. (1993). Irish Elections 1922-44: Results and Analysis. PSAI Press. ISBN 0-9519748-1-5.
- Gallagher M. and M. Marsh (1988). Candidate selection in comparative perspective:The secret garden of politics. Sage, London.
