= General ticket =

Type of block voting

The general ticket or party block voting (PBV), is a type of block voting in which voters opt for a party or a team of candidates, and the highest-polling party/team becomes the winner and receives 100% of the seats for this multi-member district. The party block voting is usually applied with more than one multi-member district to prevent one team winning all seats. This system has a winner-take-all nature similar to first-past-the-post voting for single-member districts, which is vulnerable to gerrymandering and majority reversals.

A related system is the majority bonus system, where a block of seats is awarded according to the winner of party-list proportional representation.

== Usage ==
=== Philippines ===
From 1941 up to 1949 elections, the Philippines elected its officials under this system, then known as block voting. A voter can write the name of the party on the ballot and have all of that voter's votes allocated for that party's candidates, from president to local officials; there is still an option for a voter to split one's ticket down ballot and not write the name of the party. This led to landslides for the Nacionalista Party in 1941, for the Liberal Party in 1949. The law was amended in time for the 1951 election, having voters to vote for each office separately.

=== Singapore ===
In Singapore, the general ticket system, locally known as the party block vote, elects by far most members of the Parliament of Singapore from multi-member districts known as group representation constituencies (GRCs), on a plurality basis. This operates in parallel with ordinary single-member district and nominations. This system is moderated by a requirement for racial diversity; every candidate "team" must include at least one member from a minority ethnic group. According to the government, this serves to enshrine minority representation in Parliament.

=== United States ===
Ticket voting is used to elect electors for the Electoral College for presidential elections, except for some of the electors in Maine and Nebraska who are elected by first-past-the-post in districts covering just part of each state. Under ticket voting, votes for any non-overall winning party's candidates do not receive any representation by elected members.

=== Coexistence ===
The following countries use party block voting in coexistence with other systems in different districts.

Country	Legislative body	Latest election (year)	(Seats per constituency)	Electoral system	Total seats	Share of seats elected by PBV	Constituencies
Côte d'Ivoire (Ivory Coast)	National Assembly	2025	1 (local districts), 2-6 (multi-member districts)	First-past-the-post (FPTP/SMP) in single-member districts and party block voting (PBV) in multi-member districts	255		electoral districts
Egypt	House of Representatives	2025	1 (local districts), 42–100 (list districts)	Two-round system (TRS) and party block voting (PBV/General ticket)	59		electoral districts
Singapore	Parliament	2025	1 (single-member districts), 4–5 (multi-member districts)	First-past-the-post (FPTP/SMP) in single-member districts and party block voting (PBV) in multi-member districts	108 (97 directly elected)		
United States	(United States) Electoral College	2024	1–54	The electors of the Electoral College (who have opportunity to elect the President of the United States) are elected by general ticket in 48 states based on state-wide party vote tallies. Nebraska and Maine use the general ticket method for 2 statewide electors each, with the other electors chosen by first-past-the-post in single-member congressional districts.	538		All states except Maine and Nebraska, where congressional districts are also used as constituencies

=== Superposition ===
Countries using party block voting in parallel with proportional representation.

Country	Legislative body	Latest election (year)	(Seats per constituency)	Electoral system	Total seats	Share of seats elected by PBV	Constituencies
Andorra	General Council	2023	2 (local districts) / 14 (nationwide constituency)	Parallel voting / superposition (MMM): Party block voting (PBV) locally + list PR nationwide	28	50%	7 parishes, 1 nationwide constituency
Cameroon	National Assembly	2020	1–7	Coexistence+conditional supermixed/hybrid: First-past-the-post (FPTP/SMP) in single-member constituencies, party with over 50% of vote gets all seats in multi-member constituencies (party block voting), otherwise highest party gets half, rest distributed by largest remainder (Hare quota)	180	(50%/100%)	electoral districts
Chad	National Assembly	2024	Unknown	Coexistence+conditional supermixed/hybrid: First-past-the-post (FPTP/SMP) party with over 50% of vote gets all seats in multi-member constituencies (party block voting), otherwise List PR (largest remainder, closed list)	188	(50%/100%)	electoral districts
Djibouti	National Assembly	2023	3–28	Fusion / majority jackpot (MBS): 80% of seats (rounded to the nearest integer) in each constituency are awarded to the party receiving the most votes (party block voting), remaining seats are allocated proportionally to other parties receiving over 10% (closed list, D'Hondt method)	65	80%	regions

== History ==
Historically party block voting was used in the US House of Representatives before 1967 but mainly before 1847; and in France, in the pre-World War I decades of the Third Republic which began in 1870.

=== France ===
The scrutin de liste (Fr. scrutin, voting by ballot, and liste, a list) was, before World War I, a system of election of national representatives in France by which the electors of a department voted for a party-homogeneous slate of deputies to be elected to serve it nationally. It was distinguished from the scrutin d'arrondissement, also called scrutin uninominal, under which the electors in each arrondissement returned one deputy.

=== United States ===
The following is a table of every instance of the use of the general ticket in the United States Congress. General ticket system was common until limited to special use by the 1842 Apportionment Bill and locally implementing legislation which took effect after the 1845–47 Congress. Until the Congress ending in 1967 it took effect in rare instances, save for a two cases of ex-Confederate States – for one term – these had tiny delegations, were for top-up members to be at-large allocated pending redistricting, or were added to the union since the last census.

Congress	Dates	State and number of representatives
1st	1789–1791	Connecticut (5), New Jersey (4), New Hampshire (3), Pennsylvania (8)
2nd	1791–1793	Connecticut (5), New Jersey (4), New Hampshire (3)
3rd	1793–1795	Connecticut (7), Georgia (2), New Jersey (5), New Hampshire (4), Pennsylvania (13), Rhode Island (2)
4th and 5th	1795–1799	Connecticut (7), Georgia (2), New Jersey (5), New Hampshire (4), Rhode Island (2)
6th	1799–1801	Connecticut (7), Georgia (2), New Hampshire (4), Rhode Island (2)
7th	1801–1803	Connecticut (7), Georgia (2), New Jersey (5), New Hampshire (4), Rhode Island (2)
8th	1803–1805	Connecticut (7), Georgia (4), New Jersey (6), New Hampshire (5), Rhode Island (2), Tennessee (3)
9th to 12th	1805–1813	Connecticut (7), Georgia (4), New Jersey (6), New Jersey (5), Rhode Island (2)
13th	1813–1815	Connecticut (7), Delaware (2), Georgia (6), New Hampshire (6), Rhode Island (2), Vermont (6)
14th to 16th	1815–1821	Connecticut (7), Delaware (2), Georgia (6), New Jersey (6), New Hampshire (6), Rhode Island (2), Vermont (6)
17th	1821–1823	Connecticut (7), Delaware (2), Georgia (6), New Jersey (6), New Hampshire (6), Rhode Island (2)
18th	1823–1825	Connecticut (6), Georgia (7), New Jersey (6), New Hampshire (6), Rhode Island (2), Vermont (5)
19th	1825–1827	Connecticut (6), Georgia (7), New Jersey (6), New Hampshire (6), Rhode Island (2)
20th	1827–1829	Connecticut (6), New Jersey (6), New Hampshire (6), Rhode Island (2)
21st and 22nd	1829–1833	Connecticut (6), Georgia (7), New Jersey (6), New Hampshire (6), Rhode Island (2)
23rd and 24th	1833–1837	Connecticut (6), Georgia (9), Missouri (2), Mississippi (2), New Jersey (6), New Hampshire (5), Rhode Island (2)
25th and 26th	1837–1841	New Hampshire (5), Georgia (9), Missouri (2), Mississippi (2), New Jersey (6), Rhode Island (2)
27th	1841–1843	Alabama (5), Georgia (9), Missouri (2), Mississippi (2), New Hampshire (5), New Jersey (6), Rhode Island (2)
28th	1843–1845	New Hampshire (4), Georgia (8), Missouri (5), Mississippi (4)
29th	1845–1847	Iowa (2), New Hampshire (4), Missouri (5), Mississippi (4)
30th	1847–1849	Wisconsin (2)
31st to 34th	1849–1857	California (2)
35th to 37th	1857–1863	California (2), Minnesota (2)
38th to 42nd	1863–1873	California (3)
43rd to 47th	1873–1883	Florida (2), Kansas (3)
48th	1883–1885	Maine (4)
51st and 52nd	1889–1893	South Dakota (2)
53rd to 57th	1893–1903	South Dakota (2), Washington (2)
58th to 60th	1903–1909	North Dakota (2), South Dakota (2), Washington (3)
61st	1909–1911	North Dakota (2), South Dakota (2)
62nd	1911–1913	North Dakota (2), New Mexico (2), South Dakota (2)
63rd	1913–1915	Idaho (2), Montana (2), Utah (2)
64th	1915–1917	Idaho (2), Montana (2)
65th to 72nd	1917–1933	Idaho (2), Montana (2)
73rd	1933–1935	Kentucky (9), Minnesota (9), Missouri (13), North Dakota (2), Virginia (9)
74th to 77th	1935–1943	North Dakota (2)
78th to 80th	1943–1949	Arizona (2), New Mexico (2), North Dakota (2)
81st to 87th	1949–1963	New Mexico (2), North Dakota (2)
88th	1963–1965	Alabama (8), Hawaii (2), New Mexico (2)
89th and 90th	1965–1969	Hawaii (2), New Mexico (2)
91st	1969–1971	Hawaii (2)

== See also ==
- Block voting
- Directorial system
- Duverger's law
- Multiple non-transferable vote
- Plural district

== Sources ==
- Martis, Kenneth C. (1982). The Historical Atlas of United States Congressional Districts. New York: Macmillan Publishing Company.
