= Majority jackpot system =

Conditional voting rule

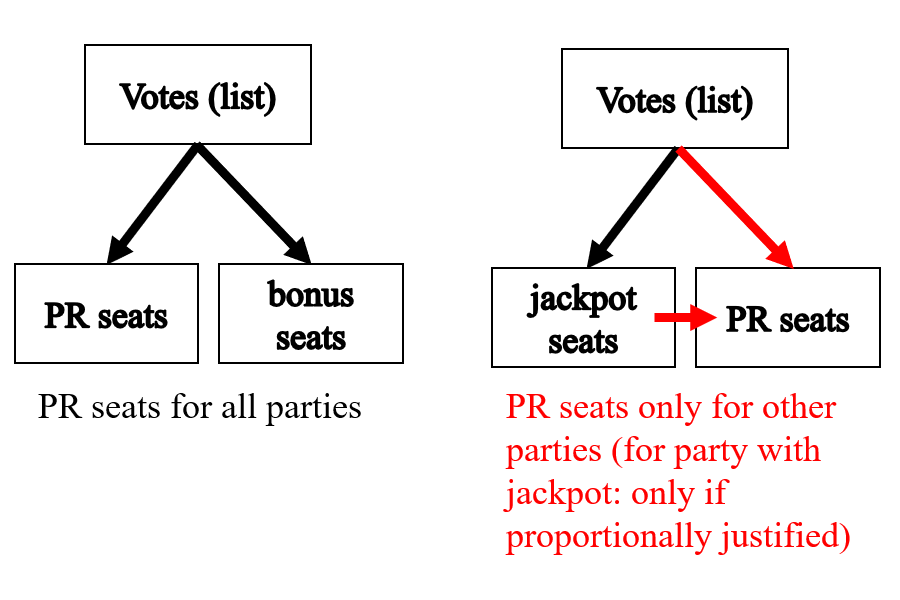
The majority jackpot system (right) is a supermixed system: by default, it not only mixes a winner take all and PR formulas in the same district and tier (fusion), it also has a conditional and compensatory element as well. (bonus system to the left)

The majority jackpot system (MJS), also known as a majority-minority apportionment, is a conditional voting rule. It produces semi-proportional representation by fixing the final apportionment for a party or alliance that wins a majority or plurality of the vote at some level (e.g. 55% of the seats). It differs from the similar majority bonus system in that the total number of seats received by the winner is fixed, whereas the bonus system assigns a fixed number of "bonus" seats to the winning party.

It is currently used in Armenia and San Marino, and was previously used in Italy from 2005 to 2013. Starting from the parliamentary elections in 2027 at the latest, Italy is expected to once again use a jackpot system.

An example of a very small, almost insignificant majority jackpot type correction system is found in Germany's electoral system for the Bundestag. If a party receives more than half of the list votes, but does not receive more than half of total seats (for example, as a result of the apportionment formula), they receive as many seats as necessary, which are added to the size of the Bundestag.

== History ==
Benito Mussolini was the first politician to enact a law to give automatic seats to the winning party and ensured his victory in the 1924 Italian general election. The system was reintroduced for the 1953 Italian general election, in which any parliamentary coalition winning an absolute majority of votes would be awarded two-thirds of the seats in Parliament. The Christian Democracy-led coalition fell narrowly short of this majority in the election, and the system was abolished before the 1958 election.

The electoral system for Hungary used in 1949 had a national majority jackpot/bonus, whereas a list of a party or alliance receiving at least 60% of the vote nationally would be entitled to 80% of seats allocated on a national level, and a list over 80% would be entitled to 100% of seats allocated on a national level.

A plurality jackpot system which awarded 55% of seats to the largest party was introduced in Italy national ones in 2005 (replacing scorporo). In the 2013 Italian general election, the Democratic Party won 292 seats in the House using its 8,644,523 votes and so needed 29,604 preferences to obtain a seat. Its major opponent, The People of Freedom, won 97 seats with 7,332,972 votes and so needed 75,597 votes for a single seat. The system in use in Italy from 2006 until 2013, which assigned the jackpot to the plurality party (even if they lacked a majority), was judged unconstitutional by the Constitutional Court of Italy. After a proposed modification involving a run-off vote (between the top two alliances) was also struck down, a variant of parallel voting was adopted for the 2018 Italian general election.

== Jackpot vs. bonus ==
The jackpot system ensures the winning party or alliance ends up with at least a certain fixed number of seats in total, by granting it however many additional seats are needed. In the Sanmarinese Parliament, the majority alliance is given 35 out of 60 seats. A jackpot system can be seen as a variant on the (compensatory) additional member system, where a set of seats are assigned by the plurality principle (but in case of the jackpot system, in a multi-member district), while the rest of the seats are assigned with the proportionality principle, taking into account the seats already distributed. This means if the majority jackpot is set at 55%, and the largest party/coalition receives 35% of the vote, they will be entitled to the additional 20% to reach 55%, but no more. The rest of the seats are distributed among the other parties, unlike the majority bonus system, which would not take them into account (like parallel voting). If the largest party would receive 60% of the vote, they would be entitled to the additional 5% of seats above the majority jackpot, unless there is also a minority jackpot. The size of a jackpot is typically above 50%, to provide for a clear majority, but may also provide for a certain size of supermajority.

Size of jackpot (%)	Vote share of the largest party (%)	Vote share of the 2nd largest party (%)	Appr. seat share of the largest party (%)	Appr. seat share of the 2nd largest party (%)	Effective bonus for largest party (%)	Effective bonus for second-largest party (%)
50%	35%	25%	50%	19%	15%	-6%
55%	35%	25%	55%	17%	20%	-8%
60%	35%	25%	60%	15%	25%	-10%
50%	45%	25%	50%	23%	5%	-2%
55%	45%	25%	55%	20%	10%	-5%
60%	45%	25%	60%	18%	15%	-7%
50%	55%	25%	55%	25%	0%	0%
55%	55%	25%	55%	25%	0%	0%
60%	55%	25%	60%	22%	5%	-3%

The table below shows the difference between the jackpot and bonus rules.

Size of bonus (%)	Size of jackpot (%)	Vote share of the largest party (%)	Appr. seat share of the largest party (%)		Effective bonus
Size of bonus (%)	Size of jackpot (%)	Vote share of the largest party (%)	Bonus system	Jackpot system	Effective bonus
10%		45%	51%		6%
25%		45%	59%		14%
50%		45%	73%		28%
	50%	45%		50%	5%
	55%	45%		55%	10%
	60%	45%		60%	15%
10%		55%	60%		5%
25%		55%	66%		11%
50%		55%	78%		23%
	50%	55%		55%	0%
	55%	55%		55%	0%
	60%	55%		60%	5%

The jackpot system essentially gives the size of the jackpot or the vote share (whichever is higher, making it a conditional system and an effectively flexible "bonus"), while the bonus system gives a fixed bonus (in terms of seat numbers, which mean slightly variable effective bonus in terms of percentages) and a proportional share of the rest of the seats. The jackpot only modifies the seat share when the largest party's proportional seats count based on its vote share is below the size of the jackpot. A jackpot system may also have further conditional elements: it may provide for a supermajority jackpot only for a party which received an absolute majority of vote.

=== Minority jackpot ===
A variant on the majority jackpot is the minority jackpot, which ensures a certain amount of minimum representation for political or minorities. A variation of the minority jackpot is lower threshold for certain minority lists or reach their first seat.

== Use ==
Country	Elected body	Jackpot type	Jackpot size	Notes
Armenia	National legislature	Second round majority	54%	Runoff is held if no single bloc obtained a majority in the first round and no coalition has been formed.
Armenia	National legislature	Minority	1/3	Minority jackpot is awarded if a party won more than 2/3 of the seats.
Djibouti	National legislature	Plurality	80%	Used in multi-member district.
Germany	National legislature	Majority	Majority ("50%+1")	Majority jackpot is awarded to a party list that won majority of the vote but did not win majority of the seats.
Italy	Chamber of Deputies (lower house)	Qualified plurality	55%	The 400 seats in the Chamber of Deputies and 200 seats in the Senate are allocated through a conditional majority jackpot system. The conditions for being awarded the jackpot of 220 seats in the Chamber and 113 in the Senate are that a coalition is 1) in first-place according to their national vote share in the popular vote for both the Chamber and the Senate and 2) that it achieved at least 42% of popular vote for both the Chamber and the Senate. Otherwise, the system works as a proportional representation system.
Italy	Senate (upper house)	Qualified plurality	56.5%	
Italy	Provincial council	Second round majority	60%	Runoff is held if no list won majority of the vote.
Italy	Municipal council	Plurality	2/3	In municipalities with more than 15000 inhabitants 2 votes are cast, the second vote awards jackpot and also functions as a double simultaneous vote with the mayoral race.
San Marino	National legislature	Second round majority	55%	Runoff is held if no single bloc obtained a majority in the first round and no coalition has been formed.
United States	Puerto Rico territorial legislature	Minority	1/3	Minority jackpot is awarded if a party won more than 2/3 of the seats.
