= Elections in North Macedonia =

North Macedonia elects on the national level a head of state—the president—and a legislature. The president is elected for a five-year term by the people. The Assembly of the Republic of North Macedonia has 120-123 members, elected for a four-year term, by proportional representation. North Macedonia has a two-party system, with numerous parties in which no one party often has a chance of gaining power alone, and parties must work with each other to form coalition governments.

== Last elections ==
=== Ethnic groups ===
Following Macedonian independence in 1991, politics in the country are split along ethnic lines with Albanians voting for Albanian parties and Macedonians voting for Macedonian parties. In this context elections have come to reflect the censuses. Ethnic groups in the country view a change in the demographic composition of an administrative unit of government as resulting in a change of a mayor's ethnic affiliation that would implement the choices and priorities of their community.

== Notes ==
The current head of the Country is VMRO-DPMNE, and the opposition is a coalition led by the SDSM party.
