= Majority bonus system =

Semi-proportional representation system

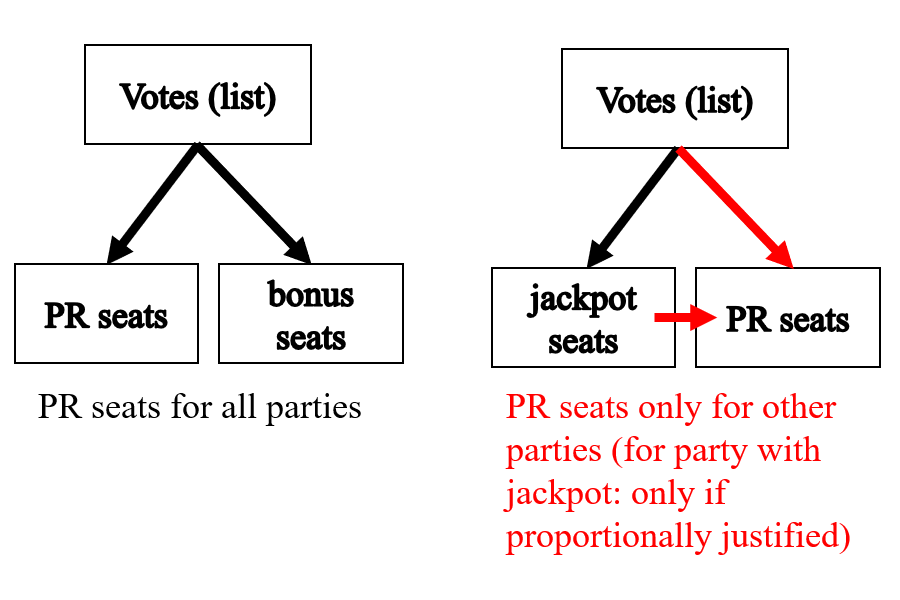
A simple bonus system (left) is also called a fusion type of mixed system. It mixes the FPTP and PR formulas in the same district and tier. A majority jackpot (right) is a supermixed system with a conditional and compensatory element as well.

A majority bonus system (MBS), also called a minority-friendly majoritarian system, is a mixed-member and partly-proportional electoral system that gives extra seats in a legislature to the party with a plurality or majority of seats. Typically, this is done with the aim of providing government stability, particularly in parliamentary systems.

The size of the majority bonus can vary substantially, is usually a fixed number of seats, and may be conditional on the number of votes for each party; however, a relatively small majority bonus (such as in the reinforced proportionality system of Greece) may not always guarantee that a single party can form a government. At the same time, as the majority bonus is allocated in a non-compensatory manner, if the majority bonus is as high as 50%, and the largest party which has 50% of the popular vote receives it, this party may win as many as 75% of all seats available. This differentiates it from the similar majority jackpot system.

At a national level, It is used in Greece, (Note: A bill abolishing the majority bonus in favor of proportional representation was introduced by the Syriza-led coalition government in 2016 but did not take effect until the second election after it was passed, so until the May 2023 Greek legislative election. This change was undone in 2020 by the New Democracy incumbent government (albeit with a slight modification of the original system), so the majority bonus was restored as of the June 2023 Greek legislative election.) and on a local level is used in Italy and France. In Argentina, it is used in the Chamber of Deputies in Santa Fe, Chubut, and Entre Ríos.

== Mechanism ==
The bonus system adds a certain fixed number of additional seats to the winning party or alliance. In the Greek Parliament up to a sixth of the assembly seats are reserved as extra seats for the winning party. In the Sicilian Regional Assembly, a tenth of the assembly seats are granted to the winning coalition on top of those allocated proportionally. The size of majority bonuses may vary greatly, from as low as a few seats to up to 50%. In case of a bonus of 50%, the party also received their proportional share of the other 50% seats, which make a supermajority almost certain.

The following table shows how small (10%), medium (25%) and large (50%) majority bonuses would work without any additional distortions of proportional systems. Using an electoral threshold or an apportionment method favoring large parties would give an even larger bonus to the largest party. The reason why the difference of the seats share and vote share (the effective bonus) is lower than the bonus is that the number of non-bonus seats to be allocated proportionally is less than the total number of seats. If all parties would get their full proportional number of seats, and one party would get the (nominal) bonus on top of that, the total number of seats would increase. While this means the size of the effective bonus (without other factors giving an effective bonus) if always smaller than the nominal one in terms of percentages, this naturally means all the parties who don't receive a bonus have a naturally less seats than they would proportionally.

Nominal size of bonus (%)	Vote share of the largest party (%)	Vote share of the 2nd largest party (%)	Appr. seat share of the largest party (%)	Appr. seat share of the 2nd largest party (%)
10%	30%	25%	37%	23%
25%	30%	25%	48%	19%
50%	30%	25%	65%	13%
10%	45%	25%	51%	23%
25%	45%	25%	59%	19%
55%	45%	25%	75%	11%
10%	60%	25%	64%	23%
25%	60%	25%	70%	19%
55%	60%	25%	82%	11%

The bonus system is unconditional and non-compensatory, while its goal in a political science sense is to provide for stable majorities (a bonus lower than 50%) does not ensure it and applies also when a stable majority can already be formed. This is the main difference between a majority bonus and a majority jackpot.

=== Bonus and jackpot ===
The difference between the majority bonus and a majority jackpot is shown in the following table, where the largest party receives a majority bonus/jackpot.

Size of bonus (%)	Size of jackpot (%)	Vote share of the largest party (%)	Appr. seat share of the largest party (%)		Effective bonus
Size of bonus (%)	Size of jackpot (%)	Vote share of the largest party (%)	Bonus system	Jackpot system	Effective bonus
10%		45%	51%		6%
25%		45%	59%		14%
50%		45%	73%		28%
	50%	45%		50%	5%
	55%	45%		55%	10%
	60%	45%		60%	15%
10%		55%	60%		5%
25%		55%	66%		11%
50%		55%	78%		23%
	50%	55%		55%	0%
	55%	55%		55%	0%
	60%	55%		60%	5%

The jackpot system essentially gives the size of the jackpot or the vote share (whichever is higher, making it a conditional electoral system and an effectively flexible "bonus"), while the bonus system gives the bonus and a proportional share of the rest of the seats. The jackpot only modifies the seat share when the largest party's proportional seats count based on its vote share is below the size of the jackpot. As the table shows, especially with a high bonus/jackpot, the two methods lead to different result, with the bonus always providing a higher seat share. For this reason the two are not usually directly compared in this, majority bonuses tend to be smaller than jackpots. The effect of a 55% jackpot for example is better compared to a bonus of around 10% to 30%.

=== Effective majority bonuses ===
Many winner-take-all systems have been described as providing a bonus to certain parties. Systems using single-member districts, particularly first-preference plurality (FPP) usually favor candidates of larger parties. A common argument for mixed-member majoritarian implementations of parallel voting is an effective bonus for certain parties. Some properties of other mixed systems such as a "winner compensation" element of Hungarian electoral system have been criticized for being effectively just a majority bonus disguised as compensation. Overhang seats in systems using the mixed-member proportional principle are also effectively bonus seats for certain parties.

== Use ==
The majority bonus system was adopted by other European countries, especially Greece in 2004, and France and Italy for regional and municipal elections.

Country	Type of election	Type of system	Used since	Size of bonus	Notes
Andorra	Local elections	Plurality bonus		50%	
Greece	National elections (legislative)	Plurality bonus	2023	0%–16.66% (Note: The system since June 2023 gives no bonus to the first party if it gets less than 25% of the vote. If it gets more than that, then it gets a bonus of 20 seats plus one seat for every 0.5% of the vote above 25% capping off at 50 seats which is reached at 40%.)	Not used in May 2023 but restored as of June 2023.
France	French Polynesia	Majority bonus (two-round)		1–4 seats per district (23%–29%)	Used in multi-member districts, but the majority bonus in all districts is given to the same party.
France	Regional elections	Majority bonus (two-round)		25%	
France	Municipal elections	Majority bonus (two-round)	1982	50%	If the leading party gets 50% of the vote, they get half the seats and the other half are distributed proportionally (leading party gets at least 75% in total). If no party gets 50% there is a second round (with all parties above 10% contesting) and the winner of the second round gets the bonus 50%.
Italy	Regional elections	Plurality bonus (supermixed)		20%	It is a double simultaneous vote, with 2 ballots (votes), ticket splitting is allowed, second ballot (one used for bonus) is also used for electing the regional presidency.
Italy	Municipal elections				

== History ==
Benito Mussolini was the first politician to enact a law (Acerbo Law) to give automatic seats to the winning party and ensured his victory in the 1924 Italian general election. This was a majority jackpot system, a precursor to the majority bonus system. During the interwar period, Romania used a majority bonus system in which half of the seats were awarded to the winning party if it obtained at least 40% of the votes, while the other half of the seats (or all seats in case no party crossed 40%) were divided proportionally between all parties that crossed the 2% electoral threshold, including the winner. This ensured that the winning party would have a parliamentary supermajority, since the minimum vote share needed to activate the majority bonus, 40%, would result in a minimum seat share of 70% if no votes were "wasted" on parties that did not cross the threshold.
