= 2011 national electoral calendar =

National and federal elections held in 2011

- Countries with national elections or referendums: Executive Legislative Executive and Legislative Referendum Executive and Referendum Legislative and Referendum Executive, Legislative and Referendum Judicial

This national electoral calendar for 2011 lists the national/federal elections held in 2011 in all sovereign states and their dependent territories. By-elections are excluded, though national referendums are included.

== January ==
- 9–15 January: South Sudan, Independence Referendum
- 23 January:
  - Central African Republic, President and Parliament (1st Round)
  - Portugal, President
- 31 January: Niger, Parliament and President (1st Round)

== February ==
- 6 February: Cape Verde, Parliament
- 13 February:
  - Chad, Parliament
  - Switzerland, Referendum
- 18 February: Uganda, President and Parliament
- 25 February: Ireland, Parliament

== March ==
- 4 March: Samoa, Parliament
- 6 March: Estonia, Parliament
- 8 March: Federated States of Micronesia, Parliament
- 12 March: Niger, President (2nd Round)
- 13 March: Benin, President
- 19 March: Egypt, Constitutional Referendum
- 20 March: Haiti, President (2nd Round)
- 27 March: Central African Republic, Parliament (2nd Round)

== April ==
- 3 April:
  - Kazakhstan, President
  - Andorra, Parliament
- 8 April: Djibouti, President
- 9 April:
  - Nigeria, Parliament (1st round)
  - Iceland, Referendum
- 10 April: Peru, President (1st round) and Parliament
- 16 April: Nigeria, President
- 17 April: Finland, Parliament
- 25 April: Chad, President
- 26 April: Nigeria, Parliament (2nd round)
- 30 April:
  - Benin, Parliament
  - Laos, Parliament

== May ==
- 2 May: Canada, Parliament
- 5 May: United Kingdom, Referendum
- 7 May:
  - Ecuador, Referendum
  - Niue, Parliament
  - Singapore, Parliament
- 19–21 May: Seychelles, President
- 22 May:
  - Cyprus, Parliament
  - Vietnam, Parliament
- 28 May: Malta, Referendum

== June ==
- 5 June:
  - Macedonia, Parliament
  - Peru, President (2nd round)
  - Portugal, Parliament
  - Slovenia, Referendum
- 12 June: Turkey, Parliament
- 12–13 June: Italy, Referendum
- 17–19 June: Liechtenstein, Referendum
- 22 June: Palau, Referendum

== July ==
- 1 July: Morocco, Constitutional Referendum
- 3 July: Thailand, Parliament
- 17 July: São Tomé and Príncipe, President (1st round)
- 23 July: Latvia, Referendum

== August ==
- 7 August:
  - Cape Verde, President (1st round)
  - São Tomé and Príncipe, President (2nd round)
- 21 August: Cape Verde, President (2nd round)
- 23 August: Liberia, Constitutional Referendum
- 26 August: Abkhazia, President
- 27 August: Singapore, President

== September ==
- 11 September: Guatemala, President (1st round) and Parliament
- 15 September: Denmark, Parliament
- 17 September: Latvia, Parliament
- 18 September: Liechtenstein, Referendum
- 20 September: Zambia, President and parliament
- 24 September: United Arab Emirates, Parliament
- 25 September: France, Senate
- 29 September: Isle of Man, Parliament
- 29 September–1 October: Seychelles, Parliament

== October ==
- 9 October:
  - Poland, Parliament
  - Cameroon, President
  - Paraguay, Referendum
- 11 October: Liberia, President (1st round) and Parliament
- 15 October: Oman, Parliament
- 16 October: Bolivia, Judiciary
- 19 October: Jersey, Parliament
- 21/28 October: Kiribati, Parliament
- 21/24 October: United States, United Nations'Security Council
- 23 October:
  - Argentina, President and Legislative
  - Bulgaria, President (1st round)
  - Switzerland, Federal
  - Tunisia, Constituent Assembly
- 27 October: Ireland, President and Constitutional Referendums
- 29 October: Faroe Islands, Parliament
- 30 October:
  - Liechtenstein, Referendum
  - Bulgaria, President (2nd round)
  - Kyrgyzstan, President

== November ==
- 3 November: Falkland Islands, Referendum
- 6 November:
  - Guatemala, President (2nd round)
  - Nicaragua, President and Parliament
- 7 November: British Virgin Islands, House of Assembly
- 8 November: Liberia, President (2nd round)
- 13 November:
  - Equatorial Guinea, Constitutional Referendum
  - South Ossetia, President (1st round) and Referendum
- 20 November: Spain, Parliament
- 21 November: Marshall Islands, Parliament
- 24 November: Gambia, President
- 25 November: Morocco, Parliament
- 26 November: New Zealand, General and Referendum
- 27 November: South Ossetia, President (2nd round)
- 28–29 November: Egypt, People's Assembly (1st phase 1st round)
- 28 November:
  - Democratic Republic of the Congo, President and Parliament
  - Guyana, Parliament
  - Saint Lucia, Parliament

== December ==
- 4 December:
  - Croatia, Parliament
  - Slovenia, Parliament
  - Russia, Parliament
- 5–6 December: Egypt, People's Assembly (1st phase 2nd round)
- 8 December: Gibraltar, Parliament
- 11 December:
  - Côte d'Ivoire, Parliament
  - Transnistria, President (1st round)
- 12 December:
  - Pitcairn Islands, Islands Council
- 14–15 December: Egypt, People's Assembly (2nd phase 1st round)
- 17 December: Gabon, Parliament
- 21–22 December: Egypt, People's Assembly (2nd phase 2nd round)
- 25 December: Transnistria, President (2nd round)
- 29 December: Jamaica, Parliament

== Indirect elections ==
- 4 February: Myanmar, President
- 22 February and 7 April: Kosovo, President
- 1 April: San Marino, Captains Regent
- 26–27 April: Ireland, Senate
- 11 May: Federated States of Micronesia, President
- 23 May: Netherlands, Senate
- 2 June: Latvia, President
- 15 June: Laos, President
- 22 July: India, Council of States
- 25 July: Vietnam, President
- 19 August: Kazakhstan, Senate
- 29 August: Estonia, President
- 25 September:
  - France, Senate
  - Rwanda, Senate
- 1 October: San Marino, Captains Regent
- 9 October: Republic of the Congo, Senate
- 10 November: Nauru, President
- 15 November: Nauru, President (new election)
- 20 November: Spain, Senate
- 2 December: Moldova, President
- 14 December: Switzerland, Federal Council
