= Elections by country =

For each de jure and de facto sovereign state and dependent territory an article on elections in that entity has been included and information on the way the head of state, head of government, and the legislature is selected. Merged cells for "head of state" and "head of government" indicate the office is the same for that country; merged cells for "lower house" and "upper house" indicate a unicameral legislature. The linked articles include the results of the elections. For a chronological order, see the electoral calendar.

== A ==
	Country	Head of state	Head of government	Legislature	
	Country	Head of state	Head of government	Lower house	Upper house
(Abkhazia)	Abkhazia	Direct election		Direct election	
(Afghanistan)	Afghanistan	Autocrat elected by legislature	Appointment by autocrat	Appointment by autocrat	
(Åland)	Åland	Finnish President	Election by legislature	Direct election	
(Albania)	Albania	Election by legislature	Election by legislature	Direct election	
(Algeria)	Algeria	Direct election	Election by legislature	Direct election	Partially elected by electoral college, rest appointed by President
(American Samoa)	American Samoa	US President	Direct election	Direct election	Election by regional governing councils
(Andorra)	Andorra	The French President and the Bishop of Urgell are co-heads of state	Election by legislature	Direct election	
(Angola)	Angola	Election by legislature		Direct election	
(Anguilla)	Anguilla	British Monarchy	Election by legislature	Direct election and appointments	
(Antigua and Barbuda)	Antigua and Barbuda	Monarchy	Election by legislature	Direct election	Appointments
(Argentina)	Argentina	Direct election		Direct election	
(Armenia)	Armenia	Election by Legislature	Election by Legislature	Direct election	
(Aruba)	Aruba	Dutch Monarchy	Election by legislature	Direct election	
(Australia)	Australia	Monarchy	Election by legislature	Direct election	
(Austria)	Austria	Direct election	Election by legislature	Direct election	Indirect election
(Azerbaijan)	Azerbaijan	Direct election	Appointment by president	Direct election	

== B ==
	Country	Head of state	Head of government	Legislature	
	Country	Head of state	Head of government	Lower house	Upper house
(The Bahamas)	Bahamas	Monarchy	Election by legislature	Direct election	Appointments
(Bahrain)	Bahrain	Monarchy	Appointment by monarch	Direct election	Appointments
(Bangladesh)	Bangladesh	Election by legislature	Election by legislature	Direct and indirect election	
(Barbados)	Barbados	Election by legislature	Election by legislature	Direct election	Appointments
(Belarus)	Belarus	Direct election	Appointment by president	Direct election	Indirect election and appointments
(Belgium)	Belgium	Monarchy	Election by legislature	Direct election	Indirect election
(Belize)	Belize	Monarchy	Election by legislature	Direct election	Appointments
(Benin)	Benin	Direct election		Direct election	
(Bermuda)	Bermuda	British Monarchy	Election by legislature	Direct election	Appointments
(Bhutan)	Bhutan	Monarchy	Elected by legislature	Direct election	Direct election and appointments
(Bolivia)	Bolivia	Direct election		Direct election	
(Bosnia and Herzegovina)	Bosnia and Herzegovina	Rotating presidency of directly elected candidates	Appointment by head of state	Direct election	Indirect election
(Botswana)	Botswana	Election by legislature		Direct election	Hereditary and appointments
(Brazil)	Brazil	Direct election		Direct election	Direct election
(British Virgin Islands)	British Virgin Islands	British Monarchy	Election by legislature	Direct election	
(Brunei)	Brunei	Monarchy		Appointments by head of state	
(Bulgaria)	Bulgaria	Direct election	Election by legislature	Direct election	
(Burkina Faso)	Burkina Faso	Direct election	Appointment by president	Direct election	
	Burma see Myanmar				
(Burundi)	Burundi	Direct election		Direct election and co-option	Indirect election

== C ==
	Country	Head of state	Head of government	Legislature	
	Country	Head of state	Head of government	Lower house	Upper house
	Cabo Verde see Cape Verde				
(Cambodia)	Cambodia	Monarch elected by Royal Council	Election by lower house of legislature	Direct election	Indirect election and appointments
(Cameroon)	Cameroon	Direct election	Appointment by president	Direct election	Indirect election and appointments
(Canada)	Canada	Monarchy	Election by lower house of legislature	Direct election	Appointments
(Cape Verde)	Cape Verde	Direct election	Appointment by president	Direct election	
(Cayman Islands)	Cayman Islands	British Monarchy	Election by legislature	Direct election and appointments	
(Central African Republic)	Central African Republic	Direct election	Appointment by president	Direct election	
(Chad)	Chad	Direct election	Appointment by president	Direct election	
(Chile)	Chile	Direct election		Direct election	
(China)	China	Election by legislature	Appointment by head of state	Indirect election	
(Colombia)	Colombia	Direct election		Direct election	Direct election
(Comoros)	Comoros	Direct election		Direct and indirect election	
	Congo (Brazzaville) see Republic of the Congo				
	Congo (Kinshasa) see Democratic Republic of the Congo				
(Cook Islands)	Cook Islands	New Zealand Monarchy	Election by legislature	Direct election	
(Costa Rica)	Costa Rica	Direct election		Direct election	
(Ivory Coast)	Côte d'Ivoire	Direct election	Appointment by president	Direct election	
(Croatia)	Croatia	Direct election	Election by legislature	Direct election	
(Cuba)	Cuba	Election by legislature		Direct election	
(Curaçao)	Curaçao	Dutch Monarchy	Election by legislature	Direct election	
(Cyprus)	Cyprus	Direct election		Direct election	
(Czech Republic)	Czech Republic	Direct election	Appointment by president	Direct election	

== D ==
	Country	Head of state	Head of government	Legislature	
	Country	Head of state	Head of government	Lower house	Upper house
(Democratic Republic of the Congo)	Democratic Republic of the Congo	Direct election	Appointment by president	Direct election	Indirect election
(Denmark)	Denmark	Monarchy	Election by legislature	Direct election	
(Djibouti)	Djibouti	Direct election	Appointment by president	Direct election	
(Dominica)	Dominica	Election by legislature	Appointment by president	Direct election and appointments	
(Dominican Republic)	Dominican Republic	Direct election		Direct election	

== E ==
	Country	Head of state	Head of government	Legislature	
	Country	Head of state	Head of government	Lower house	Upper house
(Ecuador)	Ecuador	Direct election		Direct election	
(Egypt)	Egypt	Direct election	Appointment by president	Direct election and appointments	
(El Salvador)	El Salvador	Direct election		Direct election	
(Equatorial Guinea)	Equatorial Guinea	Direct election	Appointment by president	Direct election	Direct election and appointments
(Eritrea)	Eritrea	Election by legislature		Direct and indirect election	
(Estonia)	Estonia	Election by legislature and/or electoral college	Appointment by president	Direct election	
(Eswatini)	Eswatini	Monarchy	Appointment by monarch	Election by traditional local councils and appointments	Election by lower house and appointments
(Ethiopia)	Ethiopia	Election by legislature	Election by legislature	Direct election	Indirect election

== F ==
	Country	Head of state	Head of government	Legislature	
	Country	Head of state	Head of government	Lower house	Upper house
(Falkland Islands)	Falkland Islands	British Monarchy	Election by legislature	Direct election and appointments	
(Faroe Islands)	Faroe Islands	Danish Monarchy	Election by legislature	Direct election	
	Federated States of Micronesia see Micronesia				
(Fiji)	Fiji	Election by legislature	Appointment by president	Direct election	
(Finland)	Finland	Direct election	Election by legislature	Direct election	
(France)	France	Direct election	Appointment by president	Direct election	Indirect election
(French Polynesia)	French Polynesia	French President	Election by legislature	Direct election	

== G ==
	Country	Head of state	Head of government	Legislature	
	Country	Head of state	Head of government	Lower house	Upper house
(Gabon)	Gabon	Direct election	Appointment by president	Direct election	Indirect election
(The Gambia)	Gambia	Direct election		Direct election and appointments	
(Georgia (country))	Georgia	Election by electoral college	Election by legislature	Direct election	
(Germany)	Germany	Election by electoral college	Election by legislature	Direct election	Representation of State Governments
(Ghana)	Ghana	Direct election		Direct election	
(Gibraltar)	Gibraltar	British Monarchy	Election by legislature	Direct and indirect election	
(Greece)	Greece	Election by legislature	Election by legislature	Direct election	
(Greenland)	Greenland	Danish Monarchy	Election by legislature	Direct election	
(Grenada)	Grenada	Monarchy	Election by legislature	Direct election	Appointment
(Guam)	Guam	US President	Direct election	Direct election	
(Guatemala)	Guatemala	Direct election		Direct election	
(Guernsey)	Guernsey	British Monarchy	Election by legislature	Direct election	
(Guinea)	Guinea	Direct election	Appointment by president	Direct election	
(Guinea-Bissau)	Guinea-Bissau	Direct election	Appointment by president	Direct election	
(Guyana)	Guyana	Election by legislature		Direct election	

== H ==
	Country	Head of state	Head of government	Legislature	
	Country	Head of state	Head of government	Lower house	Upper house
(Haiti)	Haiti	Direct election	Appointment by president	Direct election	
(Honduras)	Honduras	Direct election		Direct election	
(Hong Kong)	Hong Kong	Election by election committee followed by appointment by state council	Election by election committee followed by appointment by state council	Direct election and indirect election	
	Holy See see Vatican City				
(Hungary)	Hungary	Election by legislature	Election by legislature	Direct election	

== I ==
	Country	Head of state	Head of government	Legislature	
	Country	Head of state	Head of government	Lower house	Upper house
(Iceland)	Iceland	Direct election	Election by legislature	Direct election	
(India)	India	Election by electoral college	Election by legislature	Direct election	Indirect election
(Indonesia)	Indonesia	Direct election		Direct election	
(Iran)	Iran	Election by Assembly of Experts	Direct election	Direct election and appointment	
(Iraq)	Iraq	Election by legislature	Election by legislature	Direct election	
(Republic of Ireland)	Ireland	Direct election	Election by lower house of legislature	Direct election	Election by functional constituencies and appointment
(Isle of Man)	Isle of Man	British Monarchy	Election by legislature	Direct election	Indirect election/ex officio
(Israel)	Israel	Election by legislature	Appointment by president	Direct election	
(Italy)	Italy	Election by legislature	Appointment by president	Direct election	

== J ==
	Country	Head of state	Head of government	Legislature	
	Country	Head of state	Head of government	Lower house	Upper house
(Jamaica)	Jamaica	Monarchy	Election by lower house of legislature	Direct election	Appointment
(Japan)	Japan	Monarchy	Election by lower house of legislature	Direct election	
(Jersey)	Jersey	Monarchy	Election by legislature	Direct election	
(Jordan)	Jordan	Monarchy	Appointment by monarch	Direct election	Appointment by monarch

== K ==
	Country	Head of state	Head of government	Legislature	
	Country	Head of state	Head of government	Lower house	Upper house
(Kazakhstan)	Kazakhstan	Direct election	Appointment by president	Direct and indirect election	Indirect election and appointments
(Kenya)	Kenya	Direct election		Direct election and appointments	Direct election
(Kiribati)	Kiribati	Direct election		Direct election and appointments	
	Korea, North see North Korea				
	Korea, South see South Korea				
(Kosovo)	Kosovo	Election by legislature	Election by legislature	Direct election	
(Kuwait)	Kuwait	Monarchy	Appointment by monarch	Direct election and appointments	
(Kyrgyzstan)	Kyrgyzstan	Direct election	Election by legislature	Direct election	

== L ==
	Country	Head of state	Head of government	Legislature	
	Country	Head of state	Head of government	Lower house	Upper house
(Laos)	Laos	Election by legislature	Election by legislature	Direct election	
(Latvia)	Latvia	Election by legislature	Appointment by president	Direct election	
(Lebanon)	Lebanon	Election by legislature	Appointment by president	Direct election	
(Lesotho)	Lesotho	Monarchy	Election by lower house of legislature	Direct election	Appointments
(Liberia)	Liberia	Direct election		Direct election	Direct election
(Libya)	Libya	Head of Presidential Council		Direct election	
(Liechtenstein)	Liechtenstein	Monarchy	Election by legislature	Direct election	
(Lithuania)	Lithuania	Direct election	Appointment by president	Direct election	
(Luxembourg)	Luxembourg	Monarchy	Election by legislature	Direct election	

== M ==
	Country	Head of state	Head of government	Legislature	
	Country	Head of state	Head of government	Lower house	Upper house
(Macau)	Macau	Election by election committee	Election by election committee	Direct election, indirect election, and appointments	
(Madagascar)	Madagascar	Direct election	Election by lower house of legislature	Direct election	Indirect election and appointments
(Malawi)	Malawi	Direct election		Direct election	
(Malaysia)	Malaysia	Monarch who is elected by the rulers of the Malay States	Election by lower house of legislature	Direct election	Indirect election and appointments
(Maldives)	Maldives	Direct election		Direct election	
(Mali)	Mali	Direct election	Appointment by president	Direct election	
(Malta)	Malta	Election by legislature	Appointment by president	Direct election	
(Marshall Islands)	Marshall Islands	Election by legislature		Direct election	
(Mauritania)	Mauritania	Direct election		Direct election	Indirect election
(Mauritius)	Mauritius	Election by legislature		Direct election	
(Mexico)	Mexico	Direct election		Direct election	Direct election
(Federated States of Micronesia)	Micronesia	Election by legislature		Direct election	
(Moldova)	Moldova	Direct election		Direct election	
(Monaco)	Monaco	Monarchy		Direct election	
(Mongolia)	Mongolia	Direct election		Direct election	
(Montenegro)	Montenegro	Direct election		Direct election	
(Montserrat)	Montserrat	British Monarchy	Election by legislature	Direct election	
(Morocco)	Morocco	Monarchy	Appointment by monarch	Direct election	Indirect election and election by functional groups
(Mozambique)	Mozambique	Direct election		Direct election	
(Myanmar)	Myanmar	Election by legislature		Direct election and appointments	

== N ==
	Country	Head of state	Head of government	Legislature	
	Country	Head of state	Head of government	Lower house	Upper house
(Republic of Artsakh)	Nagorno Karabakh	Direct election		Direct election	
(Namibia)	Namibia	Direct election		Direct election	Indirect election
(Nauru)	Nauru	Election by legislature		Direct election	
(Nepal)	Nepal	Indirect election	Election by legislature	Direct election	Indirect election and appointments
(Netherlands)	Netherlands	Monarchy	Election by legislature	Direct election	Indirect election
(New Caledonia)	New Caledonia	French President	Election by legislature	Indirect election	
(New Zealand)	New Zealand	Monarchy	Election by legislature	Direct election	
(Nicaragua)	Nicaragua	Direct election		Direct election and ex officio	
(Niger)	Niger	Direct election	Appointment by president	Direct election	
(Nigeria)	Nigeria	Direct election		Direct election	
(Niue)	Niue	New Zealand Monarchy	Election by legislature	Direct election	
(Norfolk Island)	Norfolk Island	Australian Monarchy	Appointment by monarch	Direct election	
(North Korea)	North Korea	Elected by legislature		Direct election	
(North Macedonia)	North Macedonia	Direct election	Election by legislature	Direct election	
(Northern Cyprus)	Northern Cyprus	Direct election		Direct election	
(Northern Mariana Islands)	Northern Mariana Islands	US President	Direct election	Direct election	
(Norway)	Norway	Monarchy		Direct election	

== O ==
	Country	Head of state	Head of government	Legislature	
	Country	Head of state	Head of government	Lower house	Upper house
(Oman)	Oman	Monarchy		Indirect election	Appointments

== P ==
	Country	Head of state	Head of government	Legislature	
	Country	Head of state	Head of government	Lower house	Upper house
(Pakistan)	Pakistan	Election by legislature		Direct election	Indirect election
(Palau)	Palau	Direct election		Direct election	
(Palestine)	Palestine	Direct election		Direct election	
(Panama)	Panama	Direct election		Direct election	
(Papua New Guinea)	Papua New Guinea	Monarchy	Election by legislature	Direct election	
(Paraguay)	Paraguay	Direct election		Direct election	
	People's Republic of China see China				
(Peru)	Peru	Direct election		Direct election	
(Philippines)	Philippines	Direct election		Direct election	
(Pitcairn Islands)	Pitcairn Islands	British Monarchy	Direct election	Direct election and appointment	
(Poland)	Poland	Direct election	Appointment by president or election by legislature	Direct election	
(Portugal)	Portugal	Direct election	Appointment by president	Direct election	
(Puerto Rico)	Puerto Rico	US President	Direct election	Direct election	

== Q ==
	Country	Head of state	Head of government	Legislature	
	Country	Head of state	Head of government	Lower house	Upper house
(Qatar)	Qatar	Monarchy	Appointed by monarch	Appointed by monarch	

== R ==
	Country	Head of state	Head of government	Legislature	
	Country	Head of state	Head of government	Lower house	Upper house
	Republic of China see Taiwan				
(Republic of the Congo)	Republic of the Congo	Direct election		Direct election	Indirect election
(Romania)	Romania	Direct election	Appointed by president	Direct election	
(Russia)	Russia	Direct election		Direct election	Indirect election and appointments
(Rwanda)	Rwanda	Direct election	Appointment by president	Direct election and appointments	Indirect election and appointments

== S ==
	Country	Head of state	Head of government	Legislature	
	Country	Head of state	Head of government	Lower house	Upper house
(Sahrawi Arab Democratic Republic)	Sahrawi Arab Democratic Republic	Election by legislature	Appointment by president	Direct election	
(Saint Helena)	Saint Helena	British Monarchy	Appointment by monarch	Direct election and appointments	
(Saint Kitts and Nevis)	Saint Kitts and Nevis	Monarchy	Election by legislature	Direct election and appointments	
(Saint Lucia)	Saint Lucia	Monarchy		Direct election	Appointments
(Saint Pierre and Miquelon)	Saint Pierre and Miquelon	French President	Election by legislature	Direct election	
(Saint Vincent and the Grenadines)	Saint Vincent and the Grenadines	Monarchy		Direct election and appointments	
(Samoa)	Samoa	Election by legislature		Direct election	
(San Marino)	San Marino	Election by legislature		Direct election	
(São Tomé and Príncipe)	São Tomé and Príncipe	Direct election		Direct election	
(Saudi Arabia)	Saudi Arabia	Monarchy		Appointment by monarch	
(Senegal)	Senegal	Direct election		Direct election	
(Serbia)	Serbia	Direct election		Direct election	
(Seychelles)	Seychelles	Direct election		Direct election	
(Sierra Leone)	Sierra Leone	Direct election		Direct election	
(Singapore)	Singapore	Direct election		Direct election	
(Sint Maarten)	Sint Maarten	Dutch Monarchy	Election by legislature	Direct election	
(Slovakia)	Slovakia	Direct election		Direct election	
(Slovenia)	Slovenia	Direct election		Direct election	Representation of interest groups
(Solomon Islands)	Solomon Islands	Monarchy	Election by legislature	Direct election	
(Somalia)	Somalia	Direct election		Transition	
(Somaliland)	Somaliland	Direct election		Direct election	Traditional leaders
(South Africa)	South Africa	Election by lower house of legislature		Direct election	Indirect election
(South Korea)	South Korea	Direct election		Direct election	
(South Ossetia)	South Ossetia	Direct election		Direct election	
(South Sudan)	South Sudan	Direct election		Direct election	
(Spain)	Spain	Monarchy	Election by legislature	Direct election	Direct and indirect election
(Sri Lanka)	Sri Lanka	Direct election		Direct election	
(Sudan)	Sudan	Direct election		Appointments due to transition	Indirect election
(Suriname)	Suriname	Election by electoral college		Direct election	
(Sweden)	Sweden	Monarchy	Election by legislature	Direct election	
(Switzerland)	Switzerland	Election by legislature		Direct election	
(Syria)	Syria	Direct election	Appointment by president	Direct election	

== T ==
	Country	Head of state	Head of government	Legislature	
	Country	Head of state	Head of government	Lower house	Upper house
(Taiwan)	Taiwan	Direct election		Direct election	
(Tajikistan)	Tajikistan	Direct election		Direct election	Indirect election and appointments
(Tanzania)	Tanzania	Direct election		Direct election	
(Thailand)	Thailand	Monarchy	Election by legislature	Direct election	Representation of interest groups
(Timor-Leste)	Timor-Leste	Direct election	Election by legislature	Direct election	
(Togo)	Togo	Direct election		Direct election	
(Tokelau)	Tokelau	New Zealand Monarchy	Rotation of village leaders	Direct election	
(Tonga)	Tonga	Monarchy		Partially direct election, partially by limited suffrage, partially ex officio	
(Transnistria)	Transnistria	Direct election		Direct election	
(Trinidad and Tobago)	Trinidad and Tobago	Election by legislature		Direct election	Appointments
(Tunisia)	Tunisia	Direct election	Election by legislature	Direct election	
(Turkey)	Turkey	Direct election		Direct election	
(Turkmenistan)	Turkmenistan	Direct election		Direct election	
(Turks and Caicos Islands)	Turks and Caicos Islands	British Monarchy	Election by legislature	Direct election	
(Tuvalu)	Tuvalu	Monarchy	Election by legislature	Direct election	

== U ==
	Country	Head of state	Head of government	Legislature	
	Country	Head of state	Head of government	Lower house	Upper house
(Uganda)	Uganda	Direct election		Direct election and appointments	
(Ukraine)	Ukraine	Direct election	Election by legislature	Direct election	
(United Arab Emirates)	United Arab Emirates	Indirect election by heads of constituent states		Appointments and indirect election	
(United Kingdom)	United Kingdom	Monarchy	Election by legislature	Direct election	Appointments, hereditary peers, and indirect election
(United States)	United States	Indirect election, Election by the 50 States using their electoral college		Direct election	
(Uruguay)	Uruguay	Direct election		Direct election	
(Uzbekistan)	Uzbekistan	Direct election		Direct election	Indirect election and appointments

== V ==
	Country	Head of state	Head of government	Legislature	
	Country	Head of state	Head of government	Lower house	Upper house
(Vanuatu)	Vanuatu	Election by electoral college	Election by legislature	Direct election	
(Vatican City)	Vatican City	Monarch elected by college of cardinals	Appointment by monarch	Appointment by monarch	
(Venezuela)	Venezuela	Direct election		Direct election	
(Vietnam)	Vietnam	Election by legislature		Direct election	
(United States Virgin Islands)	Virgin Islands	US President	Direct election	Direct election	

== W ==
	Country	Head of state	Head of government	Legislature	
	Country	Head of state	Head of government	Lower house	Upper house
(Wallis and Futuna)	Wallis and Futuna	French President	Appointment by president	Direct election	

== Y ==
	Country	Head of state	Head of government	Legislature	
	Country	Head of state	Head of government	Lower house	Upper house
(Yemen)	Yemen	Direct election	Appointment by president	Direct election	Appointment by president

== Z ==
	Country	Head of state	Head of government	Legislature	
	Country	Head of state	Head of government	Lower house	Upper house
(Zambia)	Zambia	Direct election		Mostly direct election, some appointments	
(Zimbabwe)	Zimbabwe	Direct election		Direct election	Mix of direct and indirect election

== See also ==
- List of close election results
- List of democracy and elections-related topics
- List of legislatures by country
- List of electoral systems by country
