= 2016 national electoral calendar =

National and federal elections held in 2016

- Countries with national elections or referendums: Executive Legislative Executive and Legislative Referendum Executive and Referendum Legislative and Referendum Executive, Legislative and Referendum Legislative and Judicial Executive, Legislative and Judicial

This national electoral calendar for 2016 lists the national/federal elections held in 2016 in all sovereign states and their dependent territories. By-elections are excluded, though national referendums are included.

== January ==
- 7 January: Kiribati, Parliament (2nd round)
- 16 January: Taiwan, President and Parliament
- 22 January: Vanuatu, Parliament
- 24 January: Portugal, President

== February ==
- 14 February: Central African Republic, President (2nd round) and Parliament (1st round)
- 18 February: Uganda, President and Parliament
- 21 February:
  - Bolivia, Constitutional Referendum
  - Comoros, President (1st round)
  - Niger, President (1st round) and Parliament
- 25 February: Jamaica, House of Representatives
- 26 February:
  - Iran, Parliament (1st round) and Assembly of Experts
  - Ireland, Assembly
- 28 February: Switzerland, Referendums

== March ==
- 3–24 March: New Zealand, Referendum (2nd round)
- 4 March: Samoa, Parliament
- 5 March: Slovakia, Parliament
- 6 March: Benin, President (1st round)
- 9 March: Kiribati, President
- 20 March:
  - Benin, President (2nd round)
  - Cape Verde, Parliament
  - Kazakhstan, Assembly
  - Laos, Parliament
  - Niger, President (2nd round)
  - Republic of Congo, President
  - Senegal, Constitutional Referendum
- 31 March: Central African Republic, Parliament (2nd round)

== April ==
- 6 April: Netherlands, Referendum
- 8 April: Djibouti, President
- 10 April:
  - Chad, President
  - Comoros, President (2nd round)
  - Peru, President (1st round) and Parliament
- 13 April:
  - South Korea, Parliament
  - Syria, Parliament
- 17 April: Italy, Referendum
- 24 April:
  - Austria, President (1st round)
  - Equatorial Guinea, President
  - Serbia, Parliament
- 27 April: Guernsey, Legislature
- 29 April: Iran, Parliament (2nd round)

== May ==
- 9 May: Philippines, President, Vice President, House of Representatives and Senate
- 11 May: Comoros, President (2nd round in 13 constituencies) on Anjouan)
- 14 May: Philippines, President, Vice President, House of Representatives and Senate (in 55 precincts)
- 15 May: Dominican Republic, President, Chamber of Deputies and Senate
- 22 May:
  - Austria, ~~President (2nd round)~~ (round nullified)
  - Cyprus, Parliament
  - Tajikistan, Constitutional Referendum
  - Vietnam, Parliament

== June ==
- 5 June:
  - Peru, President (2nd round)
  - Switzerland, Referendums
- 6 June: Saint Lucia, House of Assembly
- 7 June: Bahamas, Constitutional Referendum
- 23 June:
  - Bermuda, Referendum
  - Gibraltar, Brexit Referendum
  - United Kingdom, Brexit Referendum
- 25 June: Iceland, President
- 26 June: Spain, Congress of Deputies
- 29 June: Mongolia, Parliament

== July ==
- 2 July: Australia, House of Representatives and Senate
- 9 July: Nauru, Parliament
- 10 July:
  - Abkhazia, Referendum
  - Japan, House of Councillors
- 11 July: Nauru, Parliament (Aiwo only)
- 17 July: São Tomé and Príncipe, President (1st round)

== August ==
- 7 August:
  - São Tomé and Príncipe, President (2nd round)
  - Thailand, Constitutional Referendum
- 11 August: Zambia, President, Parliament and Constitutional Referendum
- 21 August: Turkmenistan, Council of Elders
- 27 August: Gabon, President

== September ==
- 4 September: Hong Kong, Legislature
- 8–10 September: Seychelles, Parliament
- 11 September:
  - Belarus, House of Representatives
  - Croatia, Parliament
- 18 September:
  - Liechtenstein, Referendum
  - Russia, State Duma
- 20 September: Jordan, House of Representatives
- 22 September: Isle of Man, House of Keys
- 25 September: Switzerland, Referendums
- 26 September:
  - Azerbaijan, Constitutional Referendum
  - Sint Maarten, Legislature

== October ==
- 2 October:
  - Cape Verde, President
  - Colombia, Referendum
  - Hungary, Referendum
- 5 October: Curaçao, Legislature
- 7 October: Morocco, House of Representatives
- 7–8 October: Czech Republic, Senate (1st round)
- 8 October: Georgia, Parliament (1st round)
- 9 October: Lithuania, Parliament (1st round)
- 14–15 October: Czech Republic, Senate (2nd round)
- 16 October: Montenegro, Parliament
- 23 October: Lithuania, Parliament (2nd round)
- 29 October: Iceland, Parliament
- 30 October:
  - Georgia, Parliament (2nd round)
  - Ivory Coast, Constitutional Referendum
  - Moldova, President (1st round)

== November ==
- 1 November: Palau, President, House of Delegates and Senate
- 5 November – 17 January 2017: Somalia, House of the People
- 6 November:
  - Bulgaria, President (1st round) and Referendum
  - Nicaragua, President and Parliament
- 8 November: United States, President, House of Representatives and Senate
- 9 November Pitcairn Islands, Mayor
- 13 November:
  - Bulgaria, President (2nd round)
  - Moldova, President (2nd round)
- 20 November:
  - Haiti, President, Chamber of Deputies (24/119 seats 2nd round), Senate (6/30 seats 2nd round) and Senate (10/30 seats 1st round)
  - San Marino, Parliament (1st round)
- 24 November: Grenada, Constitutional Referendum
- 26 November: Kuwait, Parliament
- 27 November: Switzerland, Referendum

== December ==
- 1 December: The Gambia, President
- 4 December:
  - Austria, President (2nd round revote)
  - Italy, Constitutional Referendum
  - San Marino, Parliament (2nd round)
  - Uzbekistan, President
- 7 December: Ghana, President and Parliament
- 11 December:
  - Hong Kong, Election Committee
  - Kyrgyzstan, Constitutional Referendum
  - Republic of Macedonia, Parliament
  - Romania, Chamber of Deputies and Senate
  - Transnistria, President
- 15 December: Turks and Caicos Islands, Legislature
- 18 December: Ivory Coast, National Assembly

== Indirect elections ==
The following indirect elections of heads of state and the upper houses of bicameral legislatures took place through votes in elected lower houses, unicameral legislatures, or electoral colleges:

- 4 January: Marshall Islands, President
- 27 January: Marshall Islands, President (new election)
- 26 February: Kosovo, President
- 11 March: Myanmar, President
- 14 March and 11 June: India, Council of States
- 1 April: San Marino, Captains Regent
- 2 April: Vietnam, President
- 19 April: Laos, President
- 25–26 April: Ireland, Senate
- 10 June and 27 October: Malaysia, Senate
- 18 June – 18 September: Belarus, Council of the Republic
- 26 June: Spain, Senate
- 13 July: Nauru, President
- 29–30 August, 24 September and 3 October: Estonia, President
- 1 October: San Marino, Captains Regent
- 23 April 2014 – 31 October 2016: Lebanon, President (13 rounds in 2016)

== See also ==
- 2016 in politics
