= Winner-take-all system =

System favoring larger parties over smaller ones

A winner-take-all or (winner-takes-all) system is a type of voting system where representation in a governing body or electoral district is only awarded to the candidate or party that receives the most votes. Although such systems are sometimes called "majoritarian representation" or "majorizing" systems, winners do not always have the support of an absolute majority, as it is possible for a plurality (most votes, but less than an absolute majority) to select winners. Winner-take-all systems are contrasted with proportional representation systems, wherein control of the body or district is divided proportionally to the number of votes.

Winner-take-all systems are criticized by economists, political scientists, and citizen activist groups for allowing potentially disproportionate and undemocratic results, as small pluralities can obtain complete power over a governing body, leaving the majority of voters unrepresented. Furthermore, political scientist Maurice Duverger argued that winner-take-all systems lead to two-party systems, a theory termed Duverger's Law.

== Definition and types ==
Pie charts plurality (left) and majority (right)

A voting system is winner-take-all if representation is only awarded to the candidate with the largest vote share. Since single-winner voting systems can only select one winner to represent all voters in a given body or district, all such systems are by definition winner-take-all. This includes both first-past-the-post and single-winner ranked voting methods.

A multi-winner voting system can still be winner-take-all if a plurality of voters can coordinate to only elect representation for themselves. This includes plurality block voting, where voters can select as many candidates as there are open positions, and can win all seats by simply selecting all the candidates of their preferred party. In addition, although single non-transferable voting systems can produce results where a plurality elects every seat, this requires poor coordination of minority factions, so it is not strictly winner-take-all.

If the members of a body of representatives are each elected from a winner-take-all electoral district, the system as a whole may not reflect the winner-take-all principle wherein the party with the most votes, whether plurality or majority, receives all or even most of the seats. If a sufficient number of votes from the plurality or majority are wasted in each district (see gerrymandering) a minority of voters can win a majority of seats in the governing body. (see also electoral inversion)

Popular vote and proportional representation
Party	A	B	C	D		If the assembly were elected using an at-large (nationwide) party-list proportional representation, the number of seats won by each party would correspond to their share of the popular vote.
Popular vote	44%	40%	10%	6%		If the assembly were elected using an at-large (nationwide) party-list proportional representation, the number of seats won by each party would correspond to their share of the popular vote.
Seats	44	40	10	6		If the assembly were elected using an at-large (nationwide) party-list proportional representation, the number of seats won by each party would correspond to their share of the popular vote.
Winner-take-all systems
Electoral system	Party				Seat distribution	Explanation of example
Electoral system	A	B	C	D	Seat distribution	Explanation of example
Block voting	100	0	0	0		If the whole assembly is elected in a single (nationwide) constituency under party block voting using plurality block voting, the party with the highest number of votes always can win all the seats, as long as it does not run too many candidates who split the vote.
Single-member district	64	33	0	3		If the assembly is elected in single-member districts using the first-past-the-post (single-member plurality) method, the candidate with the highest number of votes wins (the only) seat in their district. Often, the party with the highest number of votes wins in a landslide as shown here, but electoral inversion is still possible, as well as the case where no party receives an outright majority of seats (called a hung parliament in the UK).

The principle of majoritarian democracy does not necessarily imply that a winner-take-all electoral system needs to be used, in fact, using proportional systems to elect legislature usually better serve this principle as such aims to ensures that the legislature accurately reflects the whole population, not just the winners of the election and the majority rule is then used within the legislature. The most widely accepted modern views of representative democracy no longer consider winner-take-all representation to be democratic. For this reason, nowadays winner-take-all representation is most often used in single-winner districts, which allows nationwide minorities to gain representation if they make up a plurality or majority in at least one district, but some also consider this anti-democratic because of the possibility of an electoral inversion (like in the case of some US presidential elections: 2000, 2016).

Winner-take-all and proportional systems are the most commonly used voting system worldwide, followed by mixed electoral systems, which usually combine winner-take-all and proportional representation, although there are mixed system that combine two winner-take-all systems as well. Winner-take-all representation is also contrasted with proportional representation, which provides for representation of political minorities according to their share of the popular vote and semi-proportional representation, which inherently provides for some representation of minorities (at least above a certain threshold). Within mixed systems, mixed-member majoritarian representation (also known as parallel voting) provides semi-proportional representation, as opposed to mixed-member proportional systems.

== At-large winner-take-all representation ==
Historically the first multi-winner electoral systems were winner-take-all elections held at-large, or more generally the multiple non-transferable vote.

=== Decline ===
Until the first half of the 19th century, the classic winner-take-all system of block voting began to be more and more criticized. This introduced in two senses:

- a first possibility was to reduce the size of the constituencies, so to divide the election in many local contests, and consequently increase the possibility for the minority to win in some areas. At-large elections were substituted by many multi-member constituencies and, finally, by single-winner electoral districts.
- Cumulative voting and the single non-transferable vote were introduced to allow minorities to have some representation, creating the first semiproportional systems. By allowing minority groups to concentrate their votes on a few candidates, such systems ended the winner-take-all nature of the
- Eventually, proportional representation methods were developed in both Europe and separately (for apportionment) in the United States

The version of block voting using electoral lists instead of individual candidates (general ticket or party block voting) was almost completely replaced by party-list proportional voting systems, which fully abandon the winner-take-all ideal in favor of equal representation. However, with the majority bonus or majority jackpot types of mixed system, this type of winner-take-most system has partially reappeared in certain electoral systems.

== Winner-take-all districts ==
Winner-take-all representation using single-winner districts is the most common form of pure winner-take-all systems today, with the most common being single-member plurality (SMP).

However, due to high disproportionalities, it is also considered undemocratic by many. In Europe only Belarus and the United Kingdom use FPTP/SMP to elect the primary (lower) chamber of their legislature and France uses a two-round system (TRS). All other European countries either use proportional representation or use winner-take-all representation as part of a mixed-member winner-take-all system (Andorra, Italy, Hungary, Lithuania, Russia and Ukraine) or a mixed-member proportional system (Germany). However, other European countries also occasionally use winner-take-all systems (apart from single-winner elections, like presidential or mayoral elections) for elections to the secondary chamber (upper house) of their legislature (Poland) and sub-national (local and regional) elections.

Winner-take-all system are much more common outside Europe, particularly in the countries of the former British Empire, like Australia (IRV), Bangladesh, Canada, Egypt, India, Pakistan and the United States (FPTP/SMP).

Nowadays, at-large winner-take-all representation is used for national elections only in the Senate of the Philippines, while it is sometimes still used for local elections organised on non-partisan bases. Residual usage in several multi-member constituencies is reduced to the election of the Electoral college of the President of the United States. Block voting is also used to elect a part of the assemblies in the regional elections in Italy and France.

== Countries using winner-take-all rules ==
Lower (or only) house of legislature chambers		Upper house of legislature chambers (where applicable)
Single-member constituencies:	Multi-member constituencies:	Other
First past the post (FPTP/SMP) Two-round system (TRS) Instant-runoff voting (IRV)	Block voting (BV) or mixed FPTP/SMP + BV Party block voting / General ticket (PBV) or mixed (FPTP/SMP + PBV) or (FPTP/SMP + majority jackpot)	Varies by federal states or constituencies No direct election No information

Below is a table of winner-take-all systems currently used on a national level. Single-winner elections (presidential elections) and mixed systems are not included, see List of electoral systems by country for full list of electoral systems.

Key:

- Legislative body
  - Light blue background indicates upper houses of bicameral legislatures, in countries where such a chamber exists, the (usually more important) lower house might be elected with a winner-take-all system as well (in which case it is also in the list) or in might be elected with a different system, in which case (the lower house) is not included in the list. See List of electoral systems by country for full list of electoral systems.
  - Light turquoise background indicates an electoral college elected by a winner-take-all system, instead of a chamber of legislature.
- Latest election (year), in most cases this election was held under the electoral system indicated, however if the next election is already scheduled to be held under a different system, the new system is indicated and the former system is listed under Notes.
- Type of winner-take-all system may be
  - block voting at-large
  - block voting via multi-member districts or coexistence of multi-member districts and single-winner districts
  - single-winner districts
  - or varies by state if different states may set their own system in federal countries
- Constituencies indicates if the electoral districts are equivalent to or based on other administrative divisions of the country

=== Current use ===
Country	Legislative body	Latest election (year)	System	(Seats per constituency)	Electoral system	Total seats	Constituencies	Governmental system	Notes
Antigua and Barbuda	House of Representatives	2023	single-winner districts		First-past-the-post (FPTP/SMP)	17	electoral districts	Parliamentary system	
Australia and its external territories	House of Representatives	2022	single-winner districts		Instant runoff voting (IRV)	151	electoral districts	Parliamentary system	
Australia and its external territories	Cocos (Keeling) Islands	2021	single-winner districts		Instant runoff voting (IRV)	7	electoral districts		
Azerbaijan	National Assembly (Milli Mejlis)	2020	single-winner districts		First-past-the-post (FPTP/SMP)	125	electoral districts	Presidential system	
(The Bahamas) Bahamas	House of Assembly	2021	single-winner districts		First-past-the-post (FPTP/SMP)	39	electoral districts	Parliamentary system	
Bahrain	Council of Representatives	2022	single-winner districts		Two-round system (TRS)	40	electoral districts		
Bangladesh	House of the Nation (Jatiyo Sangshad)	2024	single-winner districts		First-past-the-post (FPTP/SMP)	350 (300 directly elected + 50 seats reserved for women)	electoral districts	Parliamentary system	
Barbados	House of Assembly	2022	single-winner districts		First-past-the-post (FPTP/SMP)	30	electoral districts	Parliamentary system	
Belarus	House of Representatives	2024	single-winner districts		First-past-the-post (FPTP/SMP)	110	electoral districts	Presidential system	Belarus used a two-round system before the 2016 election.
Belize	National Assembly	2020	single-winner districts		First-past-the-post (FPTP/SMP)	31	electoral districts	Parliamentary system	
Bhutan	National Assembly	2023–24	single-winner districts		First-past-the-post (FPTP/SMP)	47			
Bhutan	National Council	2023	single-winner districts		First-past-the-post (FPTP/SMP)	25 (20 directly elected + 5 appointed)	electoral districts		
Botswana	National Assembly	2024	single-winner districts		First-past-the-post (FPTP/SMP)	63 (57 directly elected + 4 members appointed by the governing party + 2 members ex officio: the President and the Attorney General)	electoral districts	Presidential system	
Brazil	Senate	2022	block voting via multi-winner districts	1 or 2 (alternates each election)	Plurality block voting (BV) and First-past-the-post (FPTP/SMP)	81	States and the Federal district	Presidential system	
Cameroon	National Assembly	2020	block voting via multi-winner districts	1-7	Coexistence+conditional supermixed/hybrid: First-past-the-post (FPTP/SMP) in single-member constituencies, party with over 50% of vote gets all seats in multi-member constituencies (party block voting), otherwise highest party gets half, rest distributed by largest remainder (Hare quota)	180	electoral districts		
Canada	House of Commons	2025	single-winner districts		First-past-the-post (FPTP/SMP)	338	electoral districts	Parliamentary system	
Central African Republic	National Assembly	2020	single-winner districts		Two-round system (TRS)	140	electoral districts		
Chad	National Assembly	2024	block voting via multi-winner districts	?	Coexistence+conditional supermixed/hybrid: First-past-the-post (FPTP/SMP) party with over 50% of vote gets all seats in multi-member constituencies (party block voting), otherwise List PR (largest remainder, closed list)	188	electoral districts		
Comoros	Assembly of the Union	2020	single-winner districts		Two-round system (TRS)	33 (24 directly elected + 9 elected by lsland assemblies)	electoral districts	Presidential system	
Republic of the Congo	National Assembly	2022	single-winner districts		Two-round system (TRS)	151	electoral districts		
Côte d'Ivoire (Ivory Coast)	National Assembly	2021	block voting via multi-winner districts		First-past-the-post (FPTP/SMP) in single-member districts and party block voting (PBV) in multi-member districts	255	electoral districts	Presidential system	
Cuba	National Assembly of People's Power	2023	single-winner districts		Two-round system (Endorsement of selected candidates)	605	electoral districts		
Czech Republic	Senate	2022	single-winner districts		Two-round system (TRS)	27	electoral districts	Parliamentary system	
Djibouti	National Assembly	2023	mixed-member	3-28	Fusion / majority jackpot (MBS): 80% of seats (rounded to the nearest integer) in each constituency are awarded to the party receiving the most votes (party block voting), remaining seats are allocated proportionally to other parties receiving over 10% (closed list, D'Hondt method)	65	regions	Presidential system	
Dominica	House of Assembly	2022	single-winner districts		First-past-the-post (FPTP/SMP)	32 (21 directly elected, 9 appointed + Speaker + 1 ex officio)	electoral districts	Parliamentary system	
Dominican Republic	Senate	2024	single-winner districts		First-past-the-post (FPTP/SMP)	32	31 provinces and the Distrito Nacional	Presidential system	
Eritrea	National Assembly	never held (postponed since 2001)	single-winner districts		First-past-the-post (FPTP/SMP)		electoral districts	Presidential system	
Eswatini	House of Assembly	2023	single-winner districts		First-past-the-post (FPTP/SMP)	70 (59 directly elected)	electoral districts	Absolute monarchy	
Ethiopia	House of People's Representatives	2021	single-winner districts		First-past-the-post (FPTP/SMP)	547	electoral districts	Parliamentary system	
France and its overseas collectivities and territories	(France) National Assembly	2024	single-winner districts		Two-round system (TRS)	577	electoral districts	Semi-presidential system	
France and its overseas collectivities and territories	French Polynesia Assembly	2023	mixed-member	4-17	Two-round majority bonus system (MBS) in multi-member constituencies	57	electoral districts		
France and its overseas collectivities and territories	New Caledonia	2019	single-winner districts		Two-round system (TRS)	54			
Gabon	National Assembly	2018	single-winner districts		Two-round system (TRS)	143	electoral districts	Presidential system	
(The Gambia) Gambia	National Assembly	2022	single-winner districts		First-past-the-post (FPTP/SMP)	58 (53 directly elected)	electoral districts	Presidential system	
Ghana	Parliament	2024	single-winner districts		First-past-the-post (FPTP/SMP)	275	electoral districts	Presidential system	
Grenada	House of Representatives	2022	single-winner districts		First-past-the-post (FPTP/SMP)	15	electoral districts	Parliamentary system	
Haiti	Chamber of Deputies	2021	single-winner districts		Modified two-round system (TRS), more than 50% result or more than 25% lead required to win in the first round	99	electoral districts	Semi-presidential system	
Haiti	Senate	2021	single-winner districts	10 seats up for electionin each general election	Two-round system (TRS)	30		Semi-presidential system	
India	House of the People (Lok Sabha)	2024	single-winner districts		First-past-the-post (FPTP/SMP)	543	electoral districts	Parliamentary system	
Islamic Republic of Iran	Islamic Consultative Assembly (Majlis)	2024	block voting via multi-winner districts	1-30	Modified two-round block voting (BV) in multi-member districts, modified two-round system (TRS) in single-member districts (25% of votes required to win in 1st round in every constituency)	290 (285 directly elected)	electoral districts	Presidential system	
Islamic Republic of Iran	Assembly of Experts		block voting via multi-winner districts	1-16	Plurality block voting (BV)			Presidential system	
Jamaica	House of Representatives	2020	single-winner districts		First-past-the-post (FPTP/SMP)	63	electoral districts	Parliamentary system	
Kenya	National Assembly	2022	single-winner districts		First-past-the-post (FPTP/SMP)	350 (337 directly elected + other seats appointed by parties proportional with seats already won or ex officio)	290 electoral districts, 47 seats reserved for women, elected from single-member constituencies based on the 47 counties of Kenya	Presidential system	
Kiribati	House of Assembly	2020	block voting via multi-winner districts	1-3	Two-round block voting (BV) in multi-member districts, two-round system (TRS) in single-member districts (50% of votes required to win in 1st round in every constituency)	46 (44 directly elected + 1 delegate from Banaba Island and 1 ex officio)	electoral districts		
Democratic People's Republic of Korea (North Korea)	Supreme People's Assembly	2019			Two-round system (TRS)	687			
Laos	National Assembly	2021	block voting via multi-winner districts	5-19	Plurality block voting (BV)	164 (149 directly elected)	provinces		
Liberia	House of Representatives	2023	single-winner districts		First-past-the-post (FPTP/SMP)	73	electoral districts	Presidential system	
Liberia	Senate		single-winner districts		First-past-the-post (FPTP/SMP)			Presidential system	
Malawi	National Assembly	2019	single-winner districts		First-past-the-post (FPTP/SMP)	193	electoral districts	Presidential system	
Malaysia	House of Representatives (Dewan Rakyat)	2022	single-winner districts		First-past-the-post (FPTP/SMP)	222	electoral districts within the states and federal territories of Malaysia	Parliamentary system	
Maldives	People's Majlis	2024	single-winner districts		First-past-the-post (FPTP/SMP)	87	electoral districts	Presidential system	
Mali	National Assembly	2020	block voting via multi-winner districts		Two-round block voting (BV) in multi-member districts, two-round system (TRS) in single-member districts (50% of votes required to win in 1st round in every constituency)	147	electoral districts		
Marshall Islands	Legislature	2023	block voting via multi-winner districts	1-5	First-past-the-post (FPTP/SMP) in single-member constituencies (19 seats) and Plurality block voting (BV) in multi-member constituencies (14 seats)	33	electoral districts		
Mauritius	National Assembly	2024	block voting via multi-winner districts	2-3	Plurality block voting (BV)	70 (62 directly elected + 8 'best losers' appointed)	electoral districts	Parliamentary system	
Federated States of Micronesia	Congress	2023	single-winner districts		First-past-the-post (FPTP/SMP)	14	electoral districts	Presidential system	
Mongolia	State Great Assembly (Khural)	2020	block voting via multi-winner districts	1-5	Two round plurality block voting (BV) candidates have to get at least 28% of the votes in a district to get elected. If there are unfilled seat, a runoff is held with twice the number of candidates as there are unfilled seats	76	electoral districts	Semi-presidential system	
Myanmar	House of Representatives (Pyithu Hluttaw)	2020	single-winner districts		First-past-the-post (FPTP/SMP)	440 (330 directly elected)	electoral districts		
Myanmar	House of Nationalities (Amyotha Hluttaw)	2020	single-winner districts		First-past-the-post (FPTP/SMP)	224 (168 directly elected)	electoral districts		
Realm of New Zealand (overseas territories)	Cook Islands	2022	single-winner districts		First-past-the-post (FPTP/SMP)	24	electoral districts	Parliamentary system	
Realm of New Zealand (overseas territories)	Niue Assembly	2023	block voting via multi-winner districts	1 (local districts), 6 (nationwide constituency)	Parallel voting / superposition: First-past-the-post (FPTP/SMP) 14 seats + Plurality block voting 6 seats	20	electoral districts		
Realm of New Zealand (overseas territories)	Tokelau	2023	single-winner districts		First-past-the-post (FPTP/SMP)	22	electoral districts in the 3 villages		
Nigeria	House of Representatives	2023	single-winner districts		First-past-the-post (FPTP/SMP)	360	electoral districts	Presidential system	
Nigeria	Senate	2023	single-winner districts		First-past-the-post (FPTP/SMP)	109	3 electoral districts in each state and one for the Federal Capital Territory	Presidential system	
Oman	Consultative Assembly	2023	block voting via multi-winner districts	1-2	First-past-the-post (FPTP/SMP) in single-member districts and Plurality block voting (BV) in two-seat districts	86	electoral districts		
Pakistan	National Assembly	2024	single-winner districts	1 (local districts), 60 (seats reserved for women), 10 (seats reserved for religious minorities)	First-past-the-post (FPTP/SMP) for 272 seats + 70 members appointed by parties proportional with seats already won	342	electoral districts	Parliamentary system	
Palau	House of Delegates	2024	single-winner districts		First-past-the-post (FPTP/SMP)	16	single-member constituencies based	Presidential system	
Palau	Senate		single-winner districts	13	Plurality block voting (BV)	13	single nationwide constituency	Presidential system	
Papua New Guinea	National Parliament	2022	single-winner districts		Instant runoff voting (IRV) - modified (at most 3 preferences, two tiers)	111	89 elected from "open" seats and 22 from provincial seats based on the twenty provinces	Parliamentary system	
Philippines	Senate	2022	block voting at-large	12 (alternating elections)	Plurality block voting (BV)	24	single nationwide constituency	Presidential system	
Poland	Senate		single-winner districts		First-past-the-post (FPTP/SMP)	100	electoral districts	Parliamentary system	
Qatar	Consultative Assembly	2021	single-winner districts		First-past-the-post (FPTP/SMP)	45 (30 directly elected)	electoral districts		
Saint Kitts and Nevis	National Assembly	2022	single-winner districts		First-past-the-post (FPTP/SMP)	15 (11 directly elected)	electoral districts	Parliamentary system	
Saint Lucia	House of Assembly	2021	single-winner districts		First-past-the-post (FPTP/SMP)	17	electoral districts	Parliamentary system	
Saint Vincent and the Grenadines	House of Assembly	2020	single-winner districts		First-past-the-post (FPTP/SMP)	23 (15 directly elected)	electoral districts	Parliamentary system	
Samoa	Legislative Assembly (Fono)	2021	single-winner districts		First-past-the-post (FPTP/SMP)	51	electoral districts	Parliamentary system	
San Marino	Grand and General Council	2024	majority jackpot	60	Majority jackpot system (35 seat jackpot)	60	single nationwide constituency	Assembly-independent diarchic directorial republic	
Sierra Leone	Parliament	2023	single-winner districts		First-past-the-post (FPTP/SMP)	146 (132 directly elected)	electoral districts	Presidential system	
Singapore	Parliament	2020	block voting via multi-winner districts	?	First-past-the-post (FPTP/SMP) in single member constituencies + party block voting group representation constituencies (PBV)	104 (93 directly elected)	single member constituencies (SMCs) and a group representation constituencies (GRCs)	Parliamentary system	
Solomon Islands	National Parliament	2024	single-winner districts		First-past-the-post (FPTP/SMP)	50	electoral districts	Parliamentary system	
Switzerland	Council of States All cantons, except: (Canton of Jura) Jura; (Canton of Neuchâtel) Neuchâtel	2023	block voting via multi-winner districts	1–2	One-round (plurality) or two-round (majority) block voting	46	Cantons		
Syria	People's Council	2020	block voting via multi-winner districts	?	Party block voting (PBV)	250	electoral districts	Semi-presidential system	
Tonga	Legislative Assembly	2021	single-winner districts		First-past-the-post (FPTP/SMP)	26 (17 directly elected)	electoral districts in 5 islands and nobility	Parliamentary system	
Trinidad and Tobago	House of Representatives	2020	single-winner districts		First-past-the-post (FPTP/SMP)	41	electoral districts	Parliamentary system	
Turkmenistan	Assembly	2023	single-winner districts		Two-round system (TRS)	125	electoral districts	Presidential system	
Tuvalu	Parliament	2024	block voting via multi-winner districts	2	Plurality block voting (BV)	16	electoral districts	Parliamentary system	
Uganda	Parliament	2021	single-winner districts		First-past-the-post (FPTP/SMP)	529 (499 directly elected)	electoral districts, 146 seats reserved for women	Presidential system	
United Kingdom and its devolved assemblies, Crown Dependencies and British overseas territories	(United Kingdom) House of Commons	2024	single-winner districts		First-past-the-post (FPTP/SMP)	650	electoral districts	Parliamentary system	
United Kingdom and its devolved assemblies, Crown Dependencies and British overseas territories	Anguilla House of Assembly	2020	single-winner districts	1 (local districts), 4 (nationwide constituency)	First-past-the-post (FPTP/SMP) in local constituencies+ plurality block voting (BV) nationwide	13	electoral districts and a single nationwide constituency	Parliamentary system	
United Kingdom and its devolved assemblies, Crown Dependencies and British overseas territories	Bermuda House of Assembly	2020	single-winner districts		First-past-the-post (FPTP/SMP)	36	electoral districts	Parliamentary system	
United Kingdom and its devolved assemblies, Crown Dependencies and British overseas territories	Cayman Islands Parliament	2021	single-winner districts		First-past-the-post (FPTP/SMP)	19	electoral districts	Parliamentary system	Block voting was used before the 2017 election
United Kingdom and its devolved assemblies, Crown Dependencies and British overseas territories	Falkland Islands Legislative Assembly	2021	block voting via multi-winner districts	3-5	Plurality block voting (BV)	8	Stanley constituency and Camp constituency	Parliamentary system	
United Kingdom and its devolved assemblies, Crown Dependencies and British overseas territories	(Bermuda) Guernsey States of Deliberation	2020	block voting at-large	38	Plurality block voting, each voter has up to 38 votes	40 (38 directly elected)	single nationwide constituency	Parliamentary system	
United Kingdom and its devolved assemblies, Crown Dependencies and British overseas territories	Isle of Man House of Keys	2021	block voting via multi-winner districts	2	Plurality block voting (BV)	24	electoral districts	Parliamentary system	
United Kingdom and its devolved assemblies, Crown Dependencies and British overseas territories	Jersey States Assembly	2022	block voting via multi-winner districts	1-4 (local districts), 4 (nationwide constituency)	Winner-take-all parallel voting / superposition: First-past-the-post (FPTP/SMP) in single-member districts, Plurality block voting (BV) in multi-member districts seats + Plurality block voting (BV) nationwide	49	electoral districts and a single nationwide constituency	Parliamentary system	
United Kingdom and its devolved assemblies, Crown Dependencies and British overseas territories	(Montserrat) Montserrat Legislative Assembly	2024	block voting at-large	9	Plurality block voting, each voter has up to 9 votes	11 (9 directly elected)	single nationwide constituency	Parliamentary system	
United Kingdom and its devolved assemblies, Crown Dependencies and British overseas territories	(Saint Helena) Saint Helena Legislative Council	2021	block voting at-large	12	Plurality block voting, each voter has up to 12 votes	15 (12 directly elected)	single nationwide constituency	Parliamentary system	
United Kingdom and its devolved assemblies, Crown Dependencies and British overseas territories	(Turks and Caicos Islands) Turks and Caicos Islands House of Assembly	2021	block voting via multi-winner districts	1 (local districts), 5 (nationwide constituency)	Winner-take-all parallel voting / superposition: First-past-the-post (FPTP/SMP) in single-member districts + Plurality block voting (BV) nationwide	21 (15 directly elected + 4 appointed + 2 ex officio)	electoral districts and a single nationwide constituency	Parliamentary system	
United Kingdom and its devolved assemblies, Crown Dependencies and British overseas territories	(British Virgin Islands) British Virgin Islands House of Assembly	2023	single-winner districts	1 (local districts), 4 (nationwide constituency)	Winner-take-all parallel voting / superposition: First-past-the-post (FPTP/SMP) in single-member districts + Plurality block voting (BV) nationwide	13	electoral districts and a single nationwide constituency	Parliamentary system	
United States and its territories	(United States) House of Representatives	2024	single-winner districts		First-past-the-post (FPTP/SMP) in 45 states	435	electoral districts within states (congressional districts)	Presidential system	
United States and its territories	(United States) House of Representatives	2024	single-winner districts		Runoff (RV/TRS) in Georgia, Mississippi, and Texas (in case, if required for majority votes)	435	electoral districts within states (congressional districts)	Presidential system	
United States and its territories	(United States) House of Representatives	2024	single-winner districts		Instant-runoff (IRV/RCV) for Alaska (in the second half for its general election) and Maine	435	electoral districts within states (congressional districts)	Presidential system	
United States and its territories	(United States) Senate	2024	single-winner districts	1 (alternating elections)	First-past-the-post (FPTP/SMP) in 45 states	100	states	Presidential system	
United States and its territories	(United States) Senate	2024	single-winner districts	1 (alternating elections)	Runoff (RV/TRS) in Georgia, Mississippi, and Texas (in case, if required for majority votes)	100	states	Presidential system	
United States and its territories	(United States) Senate	2024	single-winner districts	1 (alternating elections)	Instant-runoff (IRV/RCV) for Alaska (in the second half for its general election) and Maine	100	states	Presidential system	
United States and its territories	(United States) Electoral College	2024	varies by state	1-55	General ticket in 48 states based on the results of the first-past-the-post (FPTP/SMP) and 2 states (Alaska and Maine) based on the results of the Instant-runoff (IRV/RCV) election(s) Maine and Nebraska use the same method for 2 statewide electors, the remaining electors are chosen in congressional districts	538	states and Washington D.C.(except Maine and Nebraska, where the congressional districts also work as constituencies)	Presidential system	Alaska has used FPTP in the 2020 election, RCV/IRV will be used first in the next (2024) presidential election.
United States and its territories	American Samoa		single-winner districts		First-past-the-post (FPTP/SMP)				
United States and its territories	Guam		single-winner districts		First-past-the-post (FPTP/SMP)				
Uzbekistan	Legislative Chamber	2020	single-winner districts		Two-round system (TRS)	150	electoral districts		second round is also held if turnout is lower than 33%
Vietnam	National Assembly	2021	block voting via multi-winner districts		Two-round block voting system in multi-member constituencies (first round needs more than 50% to get elected, second round uses plurality)	500	electoral districts		
Yemen	House of Representatives	2003	single-winner districts		First-past-the-post (FPTP/SMP)	301	electoral districts		
Zambia	National Assembly	2021	single-winner districts		First-past-the-post (FPTP/SMP)	167 (156 directly elected + 8 appointed by the President + 3 ex officio)	electoral districts	Presidential system	

=== Former use ===
Countries that replaced winner-take-all representation before 1990 are not (yet) included.

Country	Legislative body	Last use	System	Old System	New System	Governmental system	Notes
Albania		1991	single-winner districts	Two-round system (TRS)	Mixed-member proportional / additional member system (MMP/AMS)		
Algeria		1991	single-winner districts	Two-round system (TRS)	Party-list proportional representation (List PR)		
Cyprus		1981	single-winner districts	First-past-the-post (FPTP/SMP)	Party-list proportional representation (List PR)		
Denmark		1920	single-winner districts	First-past-the-post (FPTP/SMP)	Party-list proportional representation (List PR)		
Fiji		2006	single-winner districts	Instant runoff voting (IRV)	Party-list proportional representation (List PR)		Before 1999, plurality block voting and single member plurality were used
Hong Kong		1998	single-winner districts	First-past-the-post (FPTP/SMP)			
Lebanon		2012	block voting	Block voting	Party-list proportional representation (List PR)		
Lesotho		1998	single-winner districts	First-past-the-post (FPTP/SMP)	Mixed-member proportional / additional member system (MMP/AMS)		
Malta		1921	single-winner districts	First-past-the-post (FPTP/SMP)	Single transferable vote (STV)		
Moldova		1994	single-winner districts	Two-round system (TRS)	Party-list proportional representation (List PR)		
Morocco		1993	single-winner districts	First-past-the-post (FPTP/SMP)	Party-list proportional representation (List PR)		
Netherlands		1917	single-winner districts	First-past-the-post (FPTP/SMP)	Party-list proportional representation (List PR)		
New Zealand		1993	single-winner districts	First-past-the-post (FPTP/SMP)	Mixed-member proportional representation (MMP)		
Portugal			single-winner districts	First-past-the-post (FPTP/SMP)	Party-list proportional representation (List PR)		
South Africa		1997	single-winner districts	First-past-the-post (FPTP/SMP)	Party-list proportional representation (List PR)		
Togo		2002	single-winner districts	Two-round system (TRS)	Party-list proportional representation (List PR)		

== See also ==
- Semi-proportional representation
- Proportional representation
