= 2011 referendum =

2011 referendum may refer to:

- 2009–2011 Catalan independence referendums
- 2011 Egyptian constitutional referendum
- 2011 Irish constitutional referendums
- 2011 Italian referendums
- 2011 Liberian constitutional referendum
- 2011 Liechtenstein referendums
- 2011 Moroccan constitutional referendum
- 2011 New Zealand voting system referendum
- 2011 Palauan casino referendum
- 2011 Seoul free lunch referendum
- 2011 South Ossetian referendum
- 2011 South Sudanese independence referendum
- 2011 United Kingdom Alternative Vote referendum
  - Results of the 2011 United Kingdom Alternative Vote referendum
- 2011 Welsh devolution referendum
