= 2006 electoral calendar =

National and federal elections held in 2006

This electoral calendar 2006 lists the national/federal direct elections held in 2006 in the de jure and de facto sovereign states and their dependent territories. Referendums are included, although they are not elections. By-elections are not included.

== January ==
- 15 January: Chile, President (2nd round).
- 15 January: Finland, President (1st round).
- 22 January: Cape Verde, Parliament.
- 22 January: Portugal, President.
- 23 January: Canada, Parliament.
- 25 January: Palestinian National Authority, Parliament.
- 29 January: Finland, President (2nd round).

== February ==
- February 5: Costa Rica, President and Parliament
- February 7: Haiti, President (1st round)
- February 11: Tokelau, referendum on self-determination
- February 12: Cape Verde, President
- February 23: Uganda, President and Parliament

== March ==
- 5 March: Benin, President
- 12 March: El Salvador, Legislature
- 12 March: Colombia, Legislature
- 19 March: Belarus, President
- 26 March: São Tomé and Príncipe, Parliament
- 26 March: Ukraine, Parliament
- 28 March: Israel, Parliament
- 31 March: Samoa, Parliament

== April ==
- 2 April: Thailand, Parliament
- 5 April: Solomon Islands, Parliament
- 9 April: Peru, President and Parliament
- 9–10 April: Italy, Parliament
- 9 April: Hungary, Parliament (1st round)
- 19 April: Thailand, Senate
- 21 April: Haiti, Parliament (2nd round)
- 23 April: Hungary, Parliament (2nd round)
- 30 April: Laos, Parliament

== May ==
- 3 May: Chad, President
- 6 May: Singapore, Parliament
- 6–13 May: Fiji, Parliament
- 14 May: Comoros, President
- 16 May: Dominican Republic, Legislature
- 21 May: Montenegro, Referendum on independence
- 21 May: Cyprus, Legislature
- 28 May: Colombia, President
- 31 May: Montserrat, Legislature

== June ==
- 2–3 June: Czech Republic, Chamber of Deputies
- 4 June: Peru, President (2nd round)
- 4 June: San Marino, Parliament
- 14 June: Switzerland, Federal Council (indirect)
- 17 June: Slovakia, Parliament
- 25 June: Mauritania, referendum on the new constitution
- 29 June: Kuwait, Parliament

== July ==
- 2 July: Bolivia, Constituent Assembly
- 2 July: Mexico, President and Congress
- 5 July: Macedonia, Parliament
- 28–30 July : Seychelles, President
- 30 July: Democratic Republic of the Congo, President and Legislature
- 30 July: São Tomé and Príncipe, President

== August ==
- 3 August: Tuvalu, Parliament
- 28 August: Guyana, President and Parliament

== September ==
- 10 September: Montenegro, Parliament
- 17 September: Sweden, Parliament
- 17 September: Transnistria, referendum on closer ties with Russia
- 20 September: Yemen, President
- 22 September: The Gambia, President
- 26 September: Cook Islands, Parliament
- 28 September: Zambia, President and Parliament

== October ==
- 1 October: Austria, Legislature
- 1 October: Bosnia and Herzegovina, Presidency and Parliament
- 1 October: Brazil, President (1st round)
- 7 October: Latvia, Parliament
- 15 October: Ecuador, President and Parliament
- 22 October: Bulgaria, President (1st round)
- 22 October: Panama, Panama Canal expansion referendum.
- 28–29 October: Serbia, referendum on the new constitution.
- 29 October: Brazil, President (2nd round)
- 29 October: Democratic Republic of the Congo, President (2nd round)
- 29 October: Bulgaria, President (2nd round)

== November ==
- 5 November: Nicaragua, President and Parliament
- 6 November: Tajikistan, President
- 7 November: United States, House of Representatives and Senate (one third: Class 1 senators)
- 19 November: Mauritania, Parliament (1st round)
- 22 November: The Netherlands, Tweede Kamer
- 23 November: Isle of Man, House of Keys
- 25 November: Bahrain, Parliament (1st round)
- 26 November: Ecuador, President (2nd round)
- 30 November: Gibraltar, Referendum on the new constitution

== December ==
- 2 December: Bahrain, Parliament (2nd round)
- 3 December: Venezuela, President
- 3 December: Madagascar, President
- 3 December: Mauritania, Parliament (2nd round)
- 10 December: Nagorno-Karabakh, constitutional referendum
- 10 December: Transnistria, President
- 11 December: Saint Lucia, Parliament
- 15 December: Iran, Assembly of Experts
- 16/18 December: United Arab Emirates, Parliament
- 20 December: United Arab Emirates, Parliament
- 17 December: Gabon, Parliament

== See also ==
- Elections in 2006
