= Punnelu =

- Village
- Country: India
- State: Andhra Pradesh
- District: Warangal district

Languages
  - Official: Telugu
- Time zone: UTC+5:30 (IST)

Punnelu is a village in Wardhannapet mandal, Warangal district, Telangana state in India.

Punnelu has population about 5,000 and literacy about 30–40%. The main source of employment is agriculture. This village is surrounded by five lakes which are the primary sources of irrigation water. This village is within 10 km distance from Warangal city but thousands of kilometers distant from development. There has been a lower primary school since late 1960s, upgraded to primary school in mid-1980s and now upgraded to high school.

This village has monuments left from Kakatiya time and Nawabs time. There are two temples (Shiva and Vishnu temples) surviving from Kakatiya Dynasty.

The reason behind its underdevelopment is division politics. This village was notified as GramPanchayat in mid '70s as far as the records available and the first and living sarpanch was muthireddy Venkat Remreddy. Nalam Komuraiah was then served as patwari (V.A.O). After Ramreddy, Merugu Bikshapati served as Sarpanch for 15 years and then elected as Wardhannapet Mandal parishad president. Pinninti Narayan Rao was succeeded as Sarpanch after Merugu Bixapathi. Mr. Pinninti Narayan Rao died of heart attack in 1998. Mr. Bogelli Narayana Rao was then elected as Sarpanch in 1998 bielections. Mr Kathi Yellagoud was elected as Sarpanch and Kathi Ganesh was elected as MPTC in 2001 elections. In 2006 election Elisha Ellandula elected as Sarpanch and Jilla laxmi was elected as MPTC and present now osman ali shaik elected as a sarpanch in 2013, MPTC Gaddam Aruna elected in 2014.

Mohammed Abdul Khader, also known as police patel, is said to have given his own lands free for the village for building Gramapanchayat offices, temple, lakes, school, Eidgah and Masjid. He remains in the hearts of the village people for his good deeds.
