= 2016 Bahamian constitutional referendum =

A constitutional referendum was held in the Bahamas on 7 June 2016. Voters were asked whether they approve of four separate constitutional amendments. All four proposals were rejected.

== Proposed amendments ==
=== Articles 8 and 9 ===
Article 8 would have been amended from:

"A person born outside The Bahamas after 9th July 1973 shall become a citizen of The Bahamas at the date of his birth if at that date his father is a citizen of The Bahamas otherwise than by virtue of this Article or Article 3(2) of this Constitution."

to:

"(1) A person born outside The Bahamas after the coming into operation of this paragraph shall become a citizen of The Bahamas at the date of his birth if at that date his father or mother is a citizen of The Bahamas otherwise than by virtue of this Article or Article 3(2) or Article 10 of this Constitution.
(2) Paragraph (1) shall not affect the right of any person who was entitled to citizenship of The Bahamas by virtue of any provision of this Constitution in force before the coming into operation of this Article."

Article 9 would have been deleted. It states:

"Further provisions for persons born outside The Bahamas after 9th July 1973.
9.- (1) Notwithstanding anything contained in Article 8 of this Constitution, a person born legitimately outside The Bahamas after 9th July 1973 whose mother is a citizen of The Bahamas shall be entitled, upon making application on his attaining the age of eighteen years and before he attains the age of twenty-one years, in such manner as may be prescribed, to be registered as a citizen of The Bahamas:
Provided that if he is a citizen of some country other than The Bahamas he shall not be entitled to be registered as a citizen of The Bahamas under this Article unless he renounces his citizenship of that other country, takes the oath of allegiance and makes and registers such declaration of his intentions concerning residence as may be prescribed.
(2) Where a person cannot renounce his citizenship of some other country under the law of that country, he may instead make such declaration concerning that citizenship as may be prescribed.
(3) Any application for registration under this Article shall be subject to such exceptions or qualifications as may be prescribed in the interests of national security or public policy."

=== Article 10 ===
Article 10 would have been amended from:

"10. - Any woman who, after 9th July 1973, marries a person who is or becomes a citizen of The Bahamas shall be entitled, provided she is still so married, upon making application in such manner as may be prescribed and upon taking the oath of allegiance of such declaration as may be prescribed, to be registered as a citizen of The Bahamas:
Provided that the right to be registered as a citizen of The Bahamas under this Article shall be subject to such exceptions or qualifications as may be prescribed in the interests of national security of public policy."

to:

"10. - (1) A man or woman who, after the coming into operation of this Article, marries a person who is or becomes a citizen of The Bahamas shall be entitled, provided she is still so married, upon making application in such manner as may be prescribed and upon taking the oath of allegiance of such declaration as may be prescribed, to be registered as a citizen of The Bahamas:
Provided that the right to be registered as a citizen of The Bahamas under this Article shall be subject to such exceptions or qualifications as may be prescribed in the interests of national security of public policy or as set out in paragraph 2 of this Article.
(2) A person may be denied registration under this Article if –

(a) there is satisfactory evidence that -

(i) the marriage no longer subsists;
(ii) the marriage was entered into for the purpose of enabling that person to acquire citizenship of The Bahamas; or
(iii) the parties to the marriage have no intention of permanently co-habiting with each other as spouses, after marriage;

(b) the person has been convicted in any country of a criminal offence specified in any law which makes provision for such denial on the ground of such conviction.

(3) Nothing in this Article shall affect the right of any person who was entitled to apply for citizenship of The Bahamas by virtue of any provisions of this Constitution in force before the coming into operation of this Article."

=== Article 14 ===
Sections 1 and 3 of article 14 would have been amended from:

"14.- (1) Any reference in this Chapter to the father of a person shall, in relation to any person born out of wedlock other than a person legitimated before 10th July 1973, be construed as a reference to the mother of that person.
(3) Any reference in this Chapter to the national status of the father a person at the time of that person's birth, shall, in relation to a person born after the death of the father, be construed as a reference to the national status of the father at the time of the father's death."

to:

"14.- (1) A reference in this Chapter to the father of a person born out of wedlock after the coming into operation of this paragraph, means a male who satisfies any requirements as to proof of paternity as may be prescribed.
(3) Any reference in this Chapter to the national status of the parent a person at the time of that person's birth, shall, in relation to a person born after the death of the parent, be construed as a reference to the national status of the parent at the time of the parent's death; and where that death occurred before 10th July 1973 and the birth occurred after 9th July 1973 the national status that the father would have had if he had died on 10th July 1973 shall be deemed to be his national status at the time of his death."

=== Article 26 ===
Sections 3 and 4 of article 26 would have been amended from:

2"6. - (3) In this Article, the expression "discriminatory" means affording different treatment to different person attributable wholly or mainly to their respective descriptions by race, place of origin, political opinions, colour or creed whereby person of one such description are subjected to disabilities or restrictions to which person of another such description are not made subject or are accorded privileges or advantages which are not accorded to persons of another such description.
(5) Nothing contained in any law shall be held to be inconsistent with or in contravention of paragraph (1) of this Article to the extent that it makes provision with respect to standards or qualifications (not being a standard or qualification specifically relating to race, place of origin, political opinions, colour or creed in order to be eligible for service as a public officer or as a member of a disciplined force of for the service of a local government authority or a body corporate established by law for public purposes."

to:

"26. - (3) In this Article, the expression "discriminatory" means affording different treatment to different person attributable wholly or mainly to their respective descriptions by race, place of origin, political opinions, colour, creed or sex whereby person of one such description are subjected to disabilities or restrictions to which person of another such description are not made subject or are accorded privileges or advantages which are not accorded to persons of another such description.
(5) Nothing contained in any law shall be held to be inconsistent with or in contravention of paragraph (1) of this Article to the extent that it makes provision with respect to standards or qualifications (not being a standard or qualification specifically relating to race, place of origin, political opinions, colour, creed or sex in order to be eligible for service as a public officer or as a member of a disciplined force of for the service of a local government authority or a body corporate established by law for public purposes."

In addition, a new section 11 would have been added:

"(11) In this Chapter, "sex" means being male or female."

== Results ==
Question	For		Against		Invalid/ blank	Total	Registered voters	Turnout
Question	Votes	%	Votes	%	Invalid/ blank	Total	Registered voters	Turnout
Articles 8 and 9	32,249	38.73	51,022	61.27			179,508	
Article 10	24,148	28.79	59,714	71.21			179,508	
Article 14	28,246	33.98	54,890	66.02			179,508	
Article 26	17,919	21.43	65,696	78.57			179,508	
Source: Tribune242
