= 2011 Paraguayan expatriate voting referendum =

- 9 October 2011
- Are you in agreement with the amendment to Art. 120 of the National Constitution, which will read as follows: Paraguayan citizens, without distinction, who have turned eighteen years of age are eligible to vote. Paraguayans residing abroad are voters. Citizens are electors and eligible, without more restrictions than those established in this Constitution and in the law. Foreigners with permanent residence will have the same rights in municipal elections.

Results
Choice	Votes	%
Yes	298,480	78.41%
No	82,193	21.59%
Valid votes	380,673	98.86%
Invalid or blank votes	4,405	1.14%
Total votes	385,078	100.00%
Registered voters/turnout	3,039,308	12.67%

A referendum on allowing expatriate citizens to vote was held in Paraguay on 9 October 2011. The measure was approved by 78% of voters, although voter turnout was only 12.5%. If approved by the Congress, the measure would give the right to vote to more than half a million Paraguayans living abroad, mostly in Argentina, Spain and the United States. President Fernando Lugo believed it would strengthen Paraguay's democracy.

== Results ==
Paraguayan expatriate voting referendum, 2011
Choice	Votes	%
For	298,480	78.41
Against	82,193	21.59
Total	380,673	100.00
Valid votes	380,673	98.86
Invalid/blank votes	4,405	1.14
Total votes	385,078	100.00
Registered voters/turnout	3,039,308	12.67
