= 2011 Laotian presidential election =

An indirect presidential election was held in Laos on 15 June 2011, following the opening ceremony of the newly elected assembly. Incumbent president Choummaly Sayasone was reelected, as had been widely expected.
