= 2011 Pitcairnese general election =

Elections in the Pitcairn Islands

General elections were held in the Pitcairn Islands on 12 December 2011.

== Results ==
Simon Young was re-elected Deputy Mayor whilst the five members elected to the Island Council were:

- Jay Warren
- Brenda Christian
- Michelle Christian
- Jacqui Christian
- Kerry Young
