= June 2011 Slovenian referendum =

Three referendums were held in Slovenia on 5 June 2011, the so-called super-referendum Sunday (Slovene: superreferendumska nedelja). The questions asked were:

- one on the reform of the pension system (the proposed revision would have raised the retirement age to 65 years, lowered the replacement rate on pensions and changed the way pensioners are able to access their second-pillar retirement savings);
- on opening secret service archives; and
- on stronger measures to combat illicit work.

All three measures were decisively defeated with 71–75% against. Voter turnout was 40%

== Results ==
Question	For		Against		Invalid/ blank	Total votes	Registered voters	Turnout	Outcome
Question	Votes	%	Votes	%	Invalid/ blank	Total votes	Registered voters	Turnout	Outcome
Illicit work	168,538	24.59	516,805	75.41	4,959	690,302	1,707,299	40.43	Rejected
Secret services archives	197,680	29.12	481,130	70.88	11,063	689,873	1,707,299	40.41	Rejected
Pension reforms	192,169	27.95	495,329	72.05	3,229	690,727	1,707,299	40.46	Rejected
Source: DVK
