= 2011 Ecuadorian referendum and popular consultation =

The 2011 Popular Consultation in Ecuador was a referendum held on May 7, 2011. President of the Republic of Ecuador Rafael Correa decreed that the 10 questions were approved based on an exit poll on Saturday, May 7. The final results were known on Thursday May 19, 2011: all the proposed changes were approved.

== Proposals ==
The ten proposals put to the vote of the Ecuadorian people were all accepted. These proposals included, amongst others:

- tougher conditions in preventive prison;
- a limitation of banking operations by financial services companies;
- a ban on media companies owning non-media companies;
- a restructuring of the judicial system under the supervision of members of the executive and the parliamentary majority;
- a ban on casinos and gambling;
- a ban on bullfighting and cockfighting (canton-by-canton decision);
- the creation of an administrative entity intended to regulate publications in the media.

== Results ==
Summary of the 7 May 2011 Ecuadorian referendum and popular consultation results
Question	Yes		No		Blank		Invalid	
Question	Votes	Percent	Votes	Percent	Votes	Percent	Votes	Percent
Referendum
Question 1	4,357,105	56.49	3,356,545	43.51	462,867	-	457,859	-
Question 2	4,167,893	54.17	3,525,832	45.83	449,296	-	491,355	-
Question 3	4,074,307	52.98	3,616,589	47,02	451,226	-	492,254	-
Question 4	3,984,723	52.02	3,674,727	47.98	478,597	-	496,329	-
Question 5	4,029,458	52.66	3,622,646	47.34	505,490	-	476,782	-
Popular consultation
Question 6	4,023,533	53.43	3,507,168	46.57	672,650	-	431,025	-
Question 7	3,951,787	52.34	3,599,093	47.66	613,088	-	470,408	-
Question 8	only cantonal results relevant							
Question 9	3,882,379	51.68	3,630,263	48.32	667,397	-	454,337	-
Question 10	4,146,640	55.03	3,388,807	44.97	648,855	-	450,074	-
Total	8,634,376	100						
Registered voters/turnout	11,158,419	77.38						
Source: National Electoral Council

In reaction Correa said "The Ecuadorean people have triumphed. [This was a victory] of this dream that is called citizen's revolution." Of the controversial media ownership amendment he said the approval was "a historic deed. We are going to diffuse the power in this country."

The chief of the Organisation of American States observer team, Enrique Correa of Chile, said that there was no evidence of fraud and that the voting appeared to go smoothly.
