= 2016 Italian oil drilling referendum =

17 April 2016
- Do you want to repeal the Article 6, Paragraph 17, Third Sentence, of the legislative decree 3 April 2006, no. 152, "Environmental regulations", as replaced by paragraph 239 of Article 1 of the law of 28 December 2015, no. 208, "Provisions for the formation of the annual and long-term state budget (stability law 2016)", limited to the following words: "for the useful life of the reservoir, in compliance with safety and environmental protection standards"?
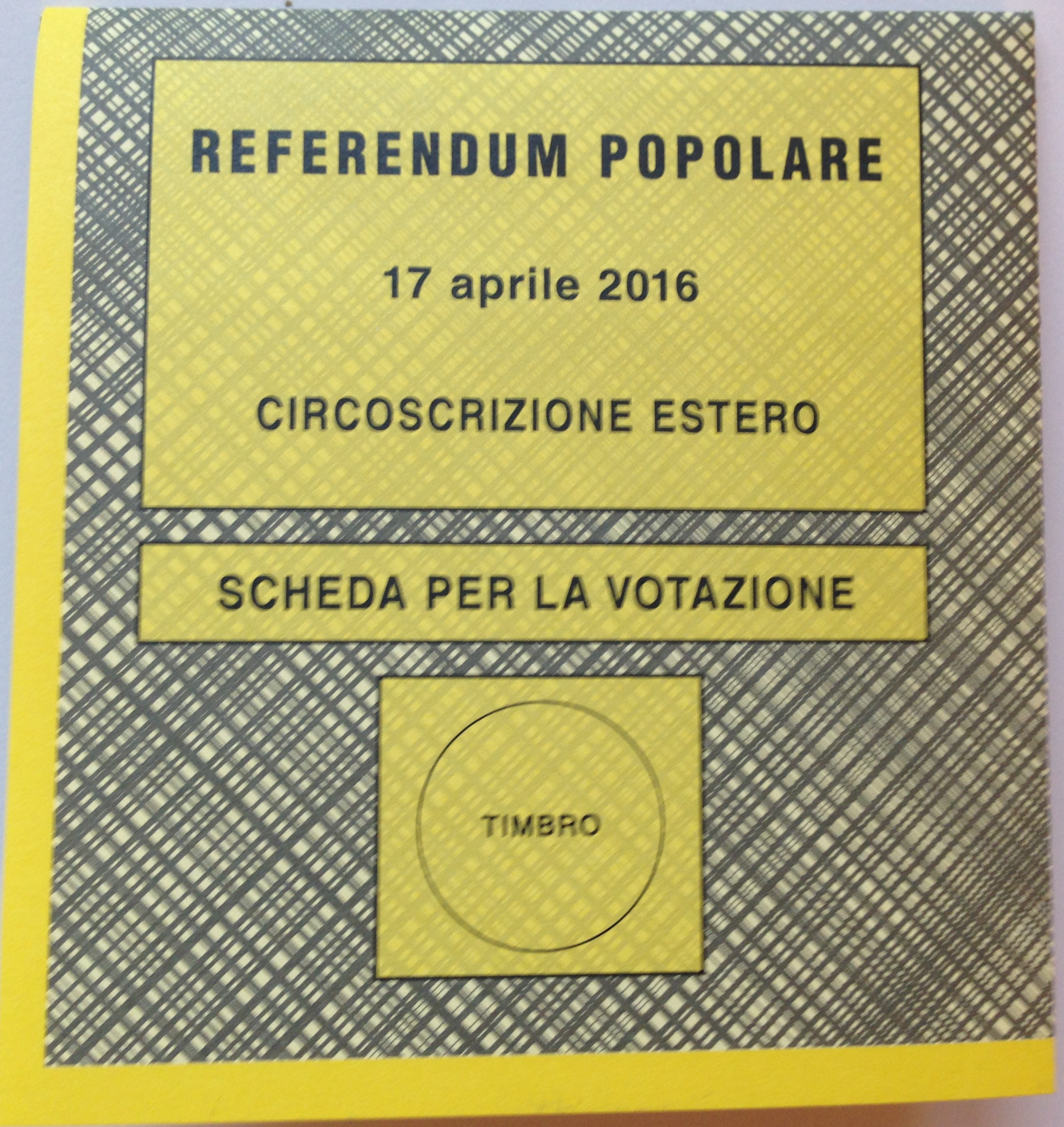
- Ballot paper for postal voting by overseas voters
- Outcome: Referendum invalid as voter turnout was below 50%

Results
Choice	Votes	%
Yes	13,334,607	85.85%
No	2,198,715	14.15%
Valid votes	15,533,322	98.27%
Invalid or blank votes	273,166	1.73%
Total votes	15,806,488	100.00%
Registered voters/turnout	50,681,765	31.19%
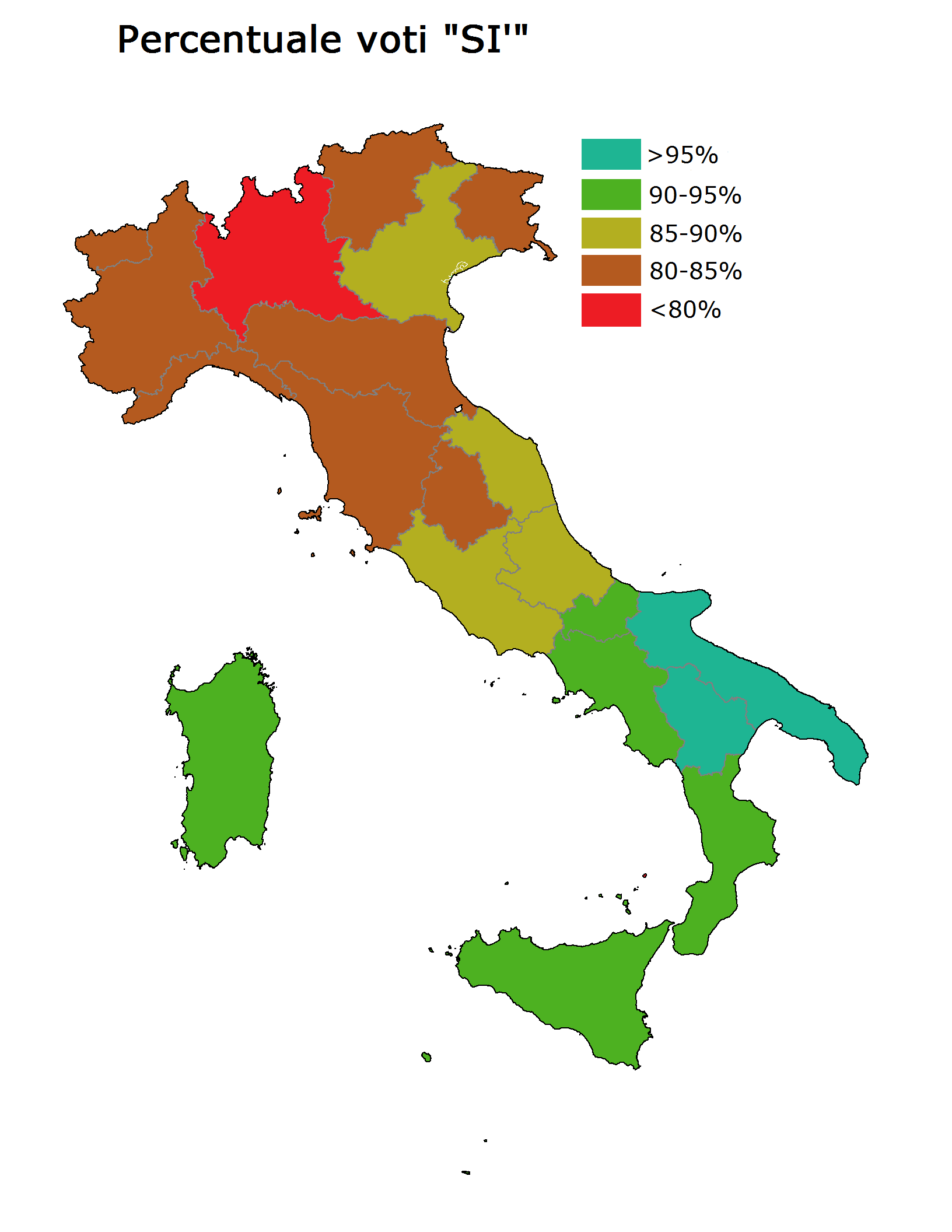
- Result by region

An abrogative referendum on oil and natural gas drilling was held in Italy on 17 April 2016. The referendum was on the proposed repealing of a law that allows gas and oil drilling concessions extracting hydrocarbon within 12 nautical miles of the Italian coast to be prolonged until the exhaustion of the useful life of the fields.

Although 86% voted in favour of repealing the law, the turnout of 31% was below the majority threshold required to validate the result.

It was the first referendum requested by at least five Regional Councils in the history of the Italian Republic: all 66 previous referendum questions since 1974 were called after the collection of signatures.

== Background ==
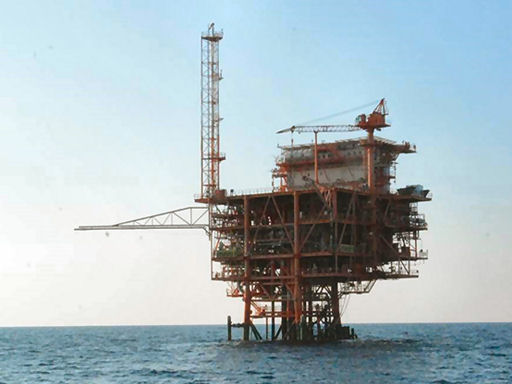
Gas platform "Annamaria B" in the Adriatic Sea off the coast of Ravenna (Emilia-Romagna)

The search for hydrocarbon liquids and/or gases in the Italian sea is possible - with some restrictions for the coastal and environmental protection - only in certain "marine areas" identified by the Italian Parliament or by the Ministry of Economic Development. From 2013, new drilling is prohibited in the Tyrrhenian Sea, in the marine protected areas and in the waters within 12 nautical miles from the coast; however, the concessions approved before 2013 may continue until all of the resources are extracted.

Italy authorized a total of 79 offshore platforms: 31 are located over 12 miles from and 48 within 12 miles.

=== Off-shore production of hydrocarbons in Italy ===
Within 12 miles, nine concessions are authorized (with 39 platforms) and their permits have expired and they have asked for an extension: if the "yes" vote wins in the referendum, the nine expired concessions can not be extended. During 2015 those installations extracted about 622 million cubic meters of natural gas (equivalent to 9% of the national production and 1.1% of total consumption in 2014).

Under the 12 mile limit, there are 17 other concessions expiring between 2017 and 2027, which in 2015 extracted 1.21 billion cubic meters of gas (17.6% of national production and 2.1% of national consumption in 2014) and 500,000 tons of oil (about 9.1% of national production and 0.8% of consumption in 2014). These concessions, in the event of a victory for 'yes' in the referendum, will not be extended after 2027.

Extraction of hydrocarbons in the offshore platforms located within 12 miles from the coast (2015)
Marine zone (region)	Natural gas (m^{3})	Natural gasoline (kg)	Petroleum (kg)
A – Emilia-Romagna (Note: Concessions: A.C 1.AG, A.C 2.AS, A.C 3.AS, A.C 4.AS, A.C 5.AV, A.C 8.ME, A.C 17.AG, A.C 21.AG, A.C 26.EA, A.C 27.EA, A.C 29.EA, A.C 30.EA and CERVIA MARE.)	935,758,382	140,487	0
B – Marche and Abruzzo (Note: Concessions: B.C 1.LF, B.C 3.AS, B.C 5.AS, B.C 7.LF and B.C 8.LF.)	54,004,511	436,237	295,826,731
C – Sicily (Note: Concessions: C.C 1.AG, C.C 3.AG and C.C 6.AG.)	4,625,021	0	247,054,152
D – Calabria (Note: Concessions: D.C 1.AG and D.C 4.AG.)	622,667,455	0	0
Total production within 12 nautical miles (2015)	1,518,932,151	576,724	542,880,883
Production percentage of the national consumption	2.27%	0.91%	
National consumption (2015)	~66,900,000,000	59,809,999,998	

== Referendum initiative ==
The referendum was proposed by several regional governments after the national government passed a law allowing drilling concessions to last until oilfields or gasfields are empty. On 19 January 2016 the Constitutional Court approved the referendum. On 12 February the Five Star Movement asked President Sergio Mattarella to delay the referendum until June to allow it to be held alongside local elections in order to raise turnout and save money.

== Position of main political parties ==
Choice	Parties	Leaders
Yes	Five Star Movement (Movimento Cinque Stelle, M5S)	Beppe Grillo
Yes	Forward Italy (Forza Italia, FI)	Silvio Berlusconi
Yes	Northern League (Lega Nord, LN)	Matteo Salvini
Yes	Italian Left (Sinistra Italiana, SI)	TBD
Yes	Brothers of Italy (Fratelli d'Italia, FdI)	Giorgia Meloni
Yes	Italy of Values (Italia dei Valori, IdV)	Ignazio Messina
Yes	Federation of the Greens (Federazione dei Verdi, FdV)	Giobbe Covatta
Yes	Possible (Possibile)	Giuseppe Civati
No	Movement for Autonomies (Movimento per le Autonomie, MpA)	Raffaele Lombardo
No	The Megaphone (Il Megafono)	Rosario Crocetta
Abstention	Democratic Party (Partito Democratico, PD)	Matteo Renzi
Abstention	New Centre-Right (Nuovo Centrodestra, NCD)	Angelino Alfano
Abstention	Civic Choice (Scelta Civica, SC)	Enrico Zanetti
Abstention	Union of the Centre (Unione di Centro, UdC)	Pierferdinando Casini

== Opinion polls ==
Date	Polling firm	Yes	No	Lead
28 Mar 2016	Piepoli	82.3	17.7	64.6
22 Mar 2016	Demopolis	74.0	26.0	48.0
15-16 Feb 2016	SWG	78.0	22.0	56.0
9-11 Dec 2015	Ixè	72.3	27.7	44.6

== Results ==
Choice	Votes	%
For	13,334,607	85.85
Against	2,198,715	14.15
Total	15,533,322	100.00
Valid votes	15,533,322	98.27
Invalid/blank votes	273,166	1.73
Total votes	15,806,488	100.00
Registered voters/turnout	50,681,765	31.19
Source: Ministry of the Interior

Votes as a percentage of the electorate
Yes	26.31%
No	4.34%
