= 2011 Italian referendums =

2011 Italian abrogative referendum
- 12–13 June 2011
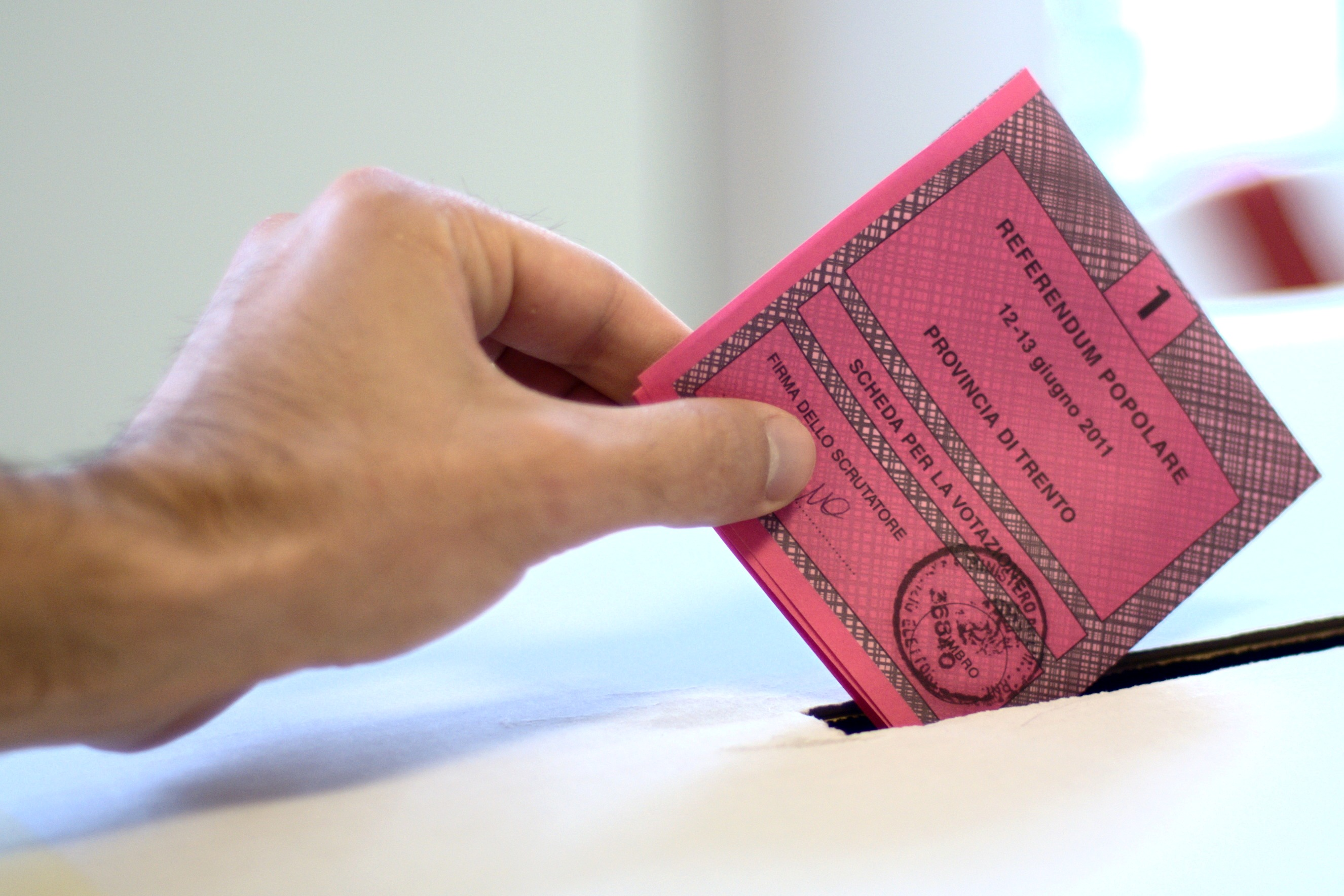
- Voting system: Popular referendum
- Outcome: Quorum met and all four referendums approved

Results
| Choice | Votes | % |
|---|---|---|
| Yes | 27,499,672 | 93.22% |
| No | 1,503,113 | 5.10% |
| Blank | 294,264 | 1.00% |
| Invalid | 202,027 | 0.68% |
| Valid votes | 29,499,076 | 100.00% |
| Invalid votes | 0 | 0.00% |
| Total votes | 29,499,076 | 100.00% |
| Registered voters/turnout | 50,692,125 | 56.9% |

Repeal of law allowing privatization of water services
| Yes | 94.6% |
| No | 5.4% |

Repeal of law allowing nuclear power development
| Yes | 94.3% |
| No | 5.7% |

Repeal of law modifying regulation of public utilities
| Yes | 95.0% |
| No | 5.0% |

Repeal of law modifying election rules
| Yes | 95.4% |
| No | 4.6% |

A nationwide abrogative referendum was held in Italy on 12 and 13 June 2011, on four questions concerning the repeal of recent laws regarding the privatisation of water services (two questions), a return to the nuclear energy which had been phased out after the 1987 referendum, and criminal procedure, specifically a provision exempting the Prime Minister and the Ministers from appearing in court. The first aim of those campaigning for a yes vote was to ensure that the quorum (50% + 1) of the electorate was reached.

Collecting the needed 500,000 signatures started in April 2010. In two months the signatures deposited were 1.4 million. The Italian Supreme Court (Court of Cassation) validated two questions about water issues in January 2011 and ruled the referendum to be held on 12–13 June 2011.

The Italians with the right to vote numbered 47,118,352 (22,604,349 men and 24,514,003 women), in addition to 3,300,496 Italians resident abroad. In order for the quorum to be reached, at least 25.209.425 votes for each question had to be cast.

Turnout, while below general election records, was higher than it had been for any referendum since 1995; on 12 June 2011, turnout had reached 11.64% at midday, and 30.32% at 19.00, indicating that the necessary quorum would likely be reached. When polls closed on 13 June 2011, turnout was 56.9%, with clear majorities of 94.6% to 96.1% in favour on all questions, meaning that about 53,8% to 54,7% of electorate approved them. Silvio Berlusconi, the then-Prime Minister, implicitly invited to boycott the vote in the hope that the required quorum would not be met.

== Position of main political parties ==
=== Parties with parliamentary representation ===
| Party | 1st question | 2nd question | 3rd question | 4th question | Source |
|---|---|---|---|---|---|
| Alliance for Italy | No | No | Yes | Yes | |
| Future and Freedom | Free | Free | Free | Free | |
| Italy of Values | Yes | Yes | Yes | Yes | |
| Lega Nord | Free | Free | Free | Free | |
| Movement for Autonomies | Yes | Yes | Yes | Yes | |
| Democratic Party | Yes | Yes | Yes | Yes | |
| The People of Freedom | Abstain | | | | |
| Italian Radicals | Free | Free | Yes | Yes | |
| South Tyrolean People's Party | Yes | Yes | Yes | Yes | |
| Union of the Centre | No | No | No | Yes | |

=== Parties without parliamentary representation ===
| Party | 1st question | 2nd question | 3rd question | 4th question | Source |
|---|---|---|---|---|---|
| Federation of the Left | Yes | Yes | Yes | Yes | |
| Tricolour Flame | Yes | Yes | Free | Abstain | |
| New Force | Yes | Yes | Yes | Yes | |
| The Right | Yes | Yes | Yes | Abstain | |
| Five Star Movement | Yes | Yes | Yes | Yes | |
| Workers' Communist Party | Yes | Yes | Yes | Yes | |
| Italian Socialist Party | Yes | Yes | Yes | Yes | |
| Pensioners' Party | Yes | Yes | Yes | Yes | |
| Critical Left | Yes | Yes | Yes | Yes | |
| Left Ecology Freedom | Yes | Yes | Yes | Yes | |
| Federation of the Greens | Yes | Yes | Yes | Yes | |

Free = Freedom of choice

=== High offices of the Republic ===
The President of the Republic Giorgio Napolitano declared he would take part to the referendums, without revealing his intentions regarding the votes.

The President of the Senate of the Republic Renato Schifani underlined the importance of the vote as a form of democratic participation and said he would vote.

The President of the Chamber of Deputies Gianfranco Fini declared he would vote.

The President of the Council of ministers Silvio Berlusconi declared he would not vote. His statement, "the Constitution gives the right to citizens to say yes or no to the referendum, but also to say 'I do not mind this question, I do not vote'", was considered an implicit invitation for his electorate to abstain, so that the referendums would fail quorum.

== Privatization of water services ==
- Ballot Colour: Red.
- Description: Repeal of the law that allowed the private sector to be entrusted the management of local public services.

Repeal the law that allowed the private sector to be entrusted the management of local public services.
| Choice | Votes | % |
|---|---|---|
| For | 25,935,372 | 95.35 |
| Against | 1,265,495 | 4.65 |
| Total | 27,200,867 | 100.00 |
| Valid votes | 27,200,867 | 98.42 |
| Invalid/blank votes | 437,078 | 1.58 |
| Total votes | 27,637,945 | 100.00 |
| Registered voters/turnout | 50,594,868 | 54.63 |
Source: Ministry of the Interior, Italy

Votes relative to the total number of registered voters
| Yes | 51.26% |
| No | 2.50% |

== Profit on water services ==
- Ballot Colour: Yellow
- Description: Repeal of the regulations governing the determination of tariffs for water supply services, in the part where they provided that the amount must assure a return on the invested capital.

Repeal regulations that determine that water tariffs must assure a return on invested capital.
| Choice | Votes | % |
|---|---|---|
| For | 26,130,637 | 95.80 |
| Against | 1,146,639 | 4.20 |
| Total | 27,277,276 | 100.00 |
| Valid votes | 27,277,276 | 98.68 |
| Invalid/blank votes | 365,181 | 1.32 |
| Total votes | 27,642,457 | 100.00 |
| Registered voters/turnout | 50,594,868 | 54.63 |
Source: Ministry of the Interior, Italy

Votes as a percentage of total number of registered voters
| Yes | 51.65% |
| No | 2.27% |

== Nuclear power ==
- Ballot Colour: grey.
- Description: Repeal of the new laws that allowed the operation of nuclear powerplants on Italian territory.

| Choice | Votes | % |
|---|---|---|
| Yes | 25,643,652 | 94.05 |
| No | 1,622,090 | 5.95 |
| Invalid/blank votes | 359,180 | – |
| Total | 27,624,922 | 100 |
| Registered voters/turnout | 50,594,868 | 54.79 |
Source: Italian Ministry of the Interior

Votes as a percentage of total number of registered voters
| Yes | 50.68% |
| No | 3.21% |

== Legal impediment ==
- Ballot Colour: green.
- Description: Repeal of the provisions introducing legittimo impedimento, which allowed the President of the Council of Ministers and the Ministers to be excused from appearing in court if prevented from doing so by government commitments.

| Choice | Votes | % |
|---|---|---|
| Yes | 25,736,273 | 94.62 |
| No | 1,462,888 | 5.38 |
| Invalid/blank votes | 422,785 | – |
| Total | 27,622,369 | 100 |
| Registered voters/turnout | 50,594,868 | 54.78 |
Source: Italian Ministry of the Interior

Votes as a percentage of total number of registered voters
| Yes | 50.87% |
| No | 2.89% |

== Results by region ==
| Region | Voting % | Question 1 | Question 2 | Question 3 | Question 4 |
|---|---|---|---|---|---|
| Valle d'Aosta | 60.85% | Yes 96.6% No 3.4% | Yes 97.0% No 3.0% | Yes 95.2% No 4.8% | Yes 95.8% No 4.2% |
| Piedmont | 59.00% | Yes 94.7% No 5.3% | Yes 95.2% No 4.8% | Yes 93.1% No 6.9% | Yes 94.3% No 5.7% |
| Liguria | 59.45% | Yes 95.7% No 4.3% | Yes 96.2% No 3.8% | Yes 94.0% No 6.0% | Yes 95.0% No 5.0% |
| Lombardy | 54.40% | Yes 93.4% No 6.6% | Yes 94.1% No 5.9% | Yes 91.6% No 8.4% | Yes 93.2% No 6.8% |
| Trentino-Alto Adige/Südtirol | 64.60% | Yes 96.8% No 3.2% | Yes 97.1% No 2.9% | Yes 96.1% No 3.9% | Yes 96.3% No 3.7% |
| Veneto | 58.90% | Yes 94.7% No 5.3% | Yes 95.3% No 4.7% | Yes 93.5% No 6.5% | Yes 93.7% No 6.3% |
| Friuli-Venezia Giulia | 58.20% | Yes 95.0% No 5.0% | Yes 95.6% No 4.4% | Yes 93.4% No 6.6% | Yes 93.9% No 6.1% |
| Emilia-Romagna | 64.15% | Yes 95.0% No 5.0% | Yes 95.4% No 4.6% | Yes 94.3% No 5.7% | Yes 95.0% No 5.0% |
| Tuscany | 63.60% | Yes 95.7% No 4.3% | Yes 96.0% No 4.0% | Yes 95.1% No 4.9% | Yes 95.5% No 4.5% |
| Marche | 61.60% | Yes 95.9% No 4.1% | Yes 96.3% No 3.7% | Yes 95.2% No 4.8% | Yes 95.3% No 4.7% |
| Umbria | 59.20% | Yes 95.5% No 4.5% | Yes 96.1% No 3.9% | Yes 94.7% No 5.3% | Yes 95.1% No 4.9% |
| Lazio | 58.90% | Yes 96.3% No 3.7% | Yes 96.9% No 3.1% | Yes 95.1% No 4.9% | Yes 95.5% No 4.5% |
| Abruzzo | 57.50% | Yes 96.4% No 3.5% | Yes 97.0% No 3.0% | Yes 95.7% No 4.3% | Yes 95.6% No 4.4% |
| Molise | 58.70% | Yes 97.4% No 2.6% | Yes 97.8% No 2.2% | Yes 96.8% No 3.2% | Yes 96.5% No 3.5% |
| Campania | 52.30% | Yes 97.8% No 2.2% | Yes 98.1% No 1.9% | Yes 96.7% No 3.3% | Yes 96.8% No 3.2% |
| Basilicata | 54.35% | Yes 97.3% No 2.7% | Yes 97.7% No 2.3% | Yes 96.8% No 3.2% | Yes 96.7% No 3.3% |
| Apulia | 52.50% | Yes 97.3% No 2.7% | Yes 97.6% No 2.4% | Yes 96.7% No 3.3% | Yes 96.4% No 3.6% |
| Calabria | 50.35% | Yes 98.0% No 2.0% | Yes 98.3% No 1.7% | Yes 97.3% No 2.7% | Yes 96.9% No 3.1% |
| Sicily | 52.70% | Yes 97.6% No 2.4% | Yes 97.9% No 2.1% | Yes 96.5% No 3.5% | Yes 96.2% No 3.8% |
| Sardinia | 58.60% | Yes 98.2% No 1.8% | Yes 98.5% No 1.5% | Yes 98.4% No 1.6% | Yes 96.5% No 3.5% |
