= 2011 South Ossetian referendum =

13 November 2011
- Do you agree Ossetian and Russian should be the national languages of South Ossetia?

Results
Choice	Votes	%
Yes	19,797	83.54%
No	3,902	16.46%
Valid votes	23,699	99.84%
Invalid or blank votes	38	0.16%
Total votes	23,737	100.00%
Registered voters/turnout	23,737	100%

A referendum on making Ossetian and Russian official languages was held in South Ossetia on 13 November 2011, alongside presidential elections. The referendum was originally scheduled for 11 September 2011, but on 12 August the decision was made to postpone it.

Prior to the referendum the first section of the fourth article of the constitution states that Ossetian is the national language in South Ossetia, while the second section states that Russian (together with Ossetian and, in certain cases, Georgian) is the official language of government bodies, state administration and local self-government.

== Results ==
Do you agree Ossetian and Russian should be the national languages of South Ossetia?

Choice	Votes	%
For	19,797	83.54
Against	3,902	16.46
Invalid/blank votes	38	–
Total	23,737	100
Registered voters/turnout		67.05
Source: Direct Democracy
