= Elections in Sint Maarten =

Sint Maarten elects a legislature called the Estates of Sint Maarten. As the country has no devolved government, this is the only chosen representation of the island. It consists of 15 members, elected for a four-year term by proportional representation. The first estates were elected in 2010 as the island council of the island area Sint Maarten as the elections took place before the dissolution of the Netherlands Antilles.

== Latest elections ==
| Party | Votes | % | Seats | +/– |
|---|---|---|---|---|
| National Alliance | 4,715 | 35.36 | 6 | +1 |
| United People's Party | 3,231 | 24.23 | 4 | +4 |
| United St. Maarten Party | 1,762 | 13.21 | 2 | 0 |
| Party for Progress | 1,407 | 10.55 | 2 | New |
| United Democrats | 1,161 | 8.71 | 1 | –6 |
| St. Maarten Christian Party | 759 | 5.69 | 0 | –1 |
| People’s Progressive Alliance | 326 | 2.45 | 0 | 0 |
| Invalid/blank votes | 402 | – | – | – |
| Total | 13,735 | 100 | 15 | 0 |
| Registered voters/turnout | 23,106 | 59.44 | – | – |
Source: Government of Sint Maarten

== See also ==
- Electoral calendar
- Electoral system
