= 2011 Palauan casino referendum =

- 22 June 2011
- Do you approve of the establishment of casino gaming in the Republic of Palau?

Results
Choice	Votes	%
Yes	1,085	24.47%
No	3,349	75.53%
Valid votes	4,434	99.93%
Invalid or blank votes	3	0.07%
Total votes	4,437	100.00%
Registered voters/turnout	14,163	31.33%

A referendum on legalising casino establishments was held in Palau on 22 June 2011. The proposal was rejected by 75.5% of voters.

== Results ==
Do you approve of the establishment of casino gaming in the Republic of Palau?

Choice	Votes	%
For	1,085	24.47
Against	3,349	75.53
Total	4,434	100.00
Valid votes	4,434	99.93
Invalid/blank votes	3	0.07
Total votes	4,437	100.00
Registered voters/turnout	14,163	31.33
Source: Direct Democracy
