= 2011 Liberian constitutional referendum =

A referendum to amend the Constitution of Liberia was held on 23 August 2011. Voters chose whether to ratify four amendments regarding judge tenure, elections scheduling, presidential candidate requirements and the electoral system. The National Elections Commission of Liberia (NEC) oversaw the referendum.

Following the referendum, the NEC announced on 31 August that none of the four amendments had been ratified by the necessary two-thirds of voters. Unity Party Chairman Varney Sherman and Senator Fredrick Cherue of River Gee County later filed a petition with the Supreme Court seeking to overturn the NEC's certification of the defeat of Proposition 4 regarding a change from absolute majority to simple majority in all non-presidential elections, arguing that the NEC had unconstitutionally included invalid ballots in its computation of the results. The Supreme Court ruled on 20 September that the NEC had erred in its calculation of the vote and declared that Proposition 4 had passed.

== Background ==
Both houses of the Legislature of Liberia passed a series of four amendments to the current Constitution of Liberia on 17 August 2010. Per Article 91(a) of the Constitution, the amendments must be ratified by two-thirds of registered voters in a referendum held not sooner than one year after the passage of the amendments in the Legislature. Though all four amendments will be voted on in the same referendum, Article 91(b) requires that each amendment be individually approved by the voters.

Initially, NEC Chairman James M. Fromayan announced that the referendum would not be held before the scheduled presidential and legislative elections on 11 October 2011, stating that the estimated cost of holding both elections in close proximity would be prohibitive. However, he reversed his position in September 2010, citing the fact that of the estimated US$69 million needed to conduct the 2011 elections, 65% of those funds would be used to hold runoff elections for legislative seats. He noted that as funding for the runoff elections had not been secured and that one of the proposed amendments would eliminate those elections, it was prudent to hold the referendum before the 2011 elections. With assurances for funding the referendum received from the government and foreign donors, the NEC scheduled the referendum to be held on 23 August 2011.

== Proposed amendments ==
=== Residence requirement ===
Article 52(c) of the Constitution requires that presidential and vice-presidential candidates have been residents of Liberia for 10 years prior to their election. A proposed amendment would have shortened the residency requirement to five years, as well as specify that residency must be held for five continuous years immediately prior to the election.

=== Supreme Court tenure ===
The terms of appointment for judges in the Liberian judicial system are defined by Article 72(b):

The Chief Justice and the Associate Justices of the Supreme Court and judges of subordinate courts of record shall be retired at the age of seventy.

A proposed amendment would have increased the mandatory retirement age for all justices to seventy-five.

=== Date of elections ===
Currently, Article 83(a) of the Constitution states:

Voting for the President, Vice–President, members of the Senate and members of the House of Representatives shall be conducted throughout the Republic on the second Tuesday in October of each election year.

The current date falls near the end of the rainy season in the country, which causes logistics difficulties for holding elections. The proposed amendment would have altered the date of national elections to the second Tuesday of November.

Additionally, municipal elections for mayors, city councils, and paramount, clan and town chiefs have yet to be held since the transition back to constitutional rule in 2005. In 2008, the Supreme Court ruled that so long as the country could not afford to hold municipal elections, the president could appoint mayors in consultation with local leaders. However, the Court ruled that once it was financially able, the National Elections Commission would be required to hold elections for municipal positions.

As the Constitution does not specify a date for the holding of these elections, the proposed amendment would have staggered these elections with presidential elections, with elections for city mayors, city councils and chiefs held three years after each presidential election.

=== Voting system ===
Article 83(b) mandated a two-round voting system for the presidential and legislative elections:

All elections of public officers shall be determined by an absolute majority of the votes cast. If no candidate obtains an absolute majority in the first ballot, a second ballot shall be conducted on the second Tuesday following. The two candidates who received the greatest numbers of votes on the first ballot shall be designated to participate in the run-off election.

As a cost-saving measure, this article was not enforced for the 2005 legislative elections, where candidates were elected by a plurality. The amendment made this arrangement permanent; all subsequent elections use a single-round first-past-the-post method for all legislative and municipal elections while maintaining the two-round system for presidential elections.

== Political positions ==
President Ellen Johnson Sirleaf announced her support for all four of the amendments, but said that her administration viewed the amendment regarding the switch to simple majority in legislative elections as the only crucial proposal due to its financial implications. The opposition Liberty Party also announced its support for the amendments but argued for more comprehensive constitutional reform. National Patriotic Party leader Jewel Taylor stated that she would vote against all four amendments, believing that the residency clause amendment discriminated against recent returnees and the extension of judge tenure would delay replacement of the country's judges with more qualified appointees. Congress for Democratic Change presidential candidate Winston Tubman called for a boycott of the referendum, calling into question its constitutionality, the impartiality of NEC Chairman Fromayan, and the feasibility of holding the referendum so near to the 2011 elections. Tubman later backed away from calling for an outright boycott, while still expressing opposition to the amendments.

== Voting ==
President Sirleaf declared the day of the referendum a public holiday. The referendum was overseen by 1,949 registered domestic and international observers, including officials from the National Democratic Institute, International Foundation for Electoral Systems, the African Union Civil Society Group and the Economic Community of West African States (ECOWAS). Voting was held at 4,457 stations across the country and proceeded peacefully, with only a single isolated incident of violence reported in Barclayville. However, the vote was marked by low turnout and confusion regarding the reasons for the referendum. Several women's advocacy groups criticized the government for a lack of awareness among women regarding the referendum.

Several voters called into local radio stations on the day of the referendum to report that their ballots had a significant error on them, with one question asking whether the voter wanted to increase judges' retirement age from "75 to 75 years" rather than the correct "70 to 75 years." NEC officials acknowledged and apologized for the error, noting that the ballots had been printed in Denmark and thus the error had been discovered after the printing had been completed. The NEC also stated that polling stations with the incorrect ballots had posted clarifications. NEC Chairman Fromayan later told reporters that the error would have no impact on the results of the referendum.

== Results ==
The official results were scheduled to be released on 7 September 2011. However, the NEC finished counting one week ahead of schedule and released the results on 31 August 2011. The NEC declared that none of the four amendments gathered the required two-thirds majority necessary for ratification.

However, following the referendum, Unity Party Chairman Varney Sherman and Senator Fredrick Cherue of River Gee County filed a petition to the Supreme Court seeking a writ of prohibition to overturn the NEC's certification of the defeat of Proposition 4 regarding the method of elections. The plaintiffs argued that the NEC had improperly counted invalid votes as "no" votes in their computations of the results. Had invalid votes been excluded from the computations, the percentage of "yes" votes for Proposition 4 would have been 67.65% of the valid votes, more than the two-thirds necessary for ratification. On 20 September, the Supreme Court ruled in favor of Sherman and Cherue and declared that Proposition 4 had been ratified.

| # | Description | For | | Against | | Invalid/ blank | Total | Registered voters | Turnout | Outcome |
| # | Description | Votes | % | Votes | % | Invalid/ blank | Total | Registered voters | Turnout | Outcome |
|---|---|---|---|---|---|---|---|---|---|---|
| 52(c) | Reducing presidential residency requirement from 10 to 5 years. | 292,318 | 54.25 | 246,473 | 45.75 | 76,912 | 615,703 | 1,798,930 | 34.2 | Rejected |
| 72(b) | Increasing mandatory retirement age of judges from 70 to 75. | 221,163 | 40.70 | 322,223 | 59.30 | 72,317 | 615,703 | 1,798,930 | 34.2 | Rejected |
| 83(a) | Moving election date to the second Tuesday of November. | 307,647 | 56.74 | 234,517 | 43.26 | 73,539 | 615,703 | 1,798,930 | 34.2 | Rejected |
| 83(b) | Using single-round first-past-the-post voting for all legislative and municipal elections. | 364,901 | 67.65 | 174,469 | 32.35 | 76,333 | 615,703 | 1,798,930 | 34.2 | Approved |
Source: African Elections Database
