= Elections in Saint Kitts and Nevis =

Saint Kitts and Nevis elects a legislature on the national level. The National Assembly has fifteen members, eleven members elected for a five-year term in single-seat constituencies, three appointed members and one ex officio member. Saint Kitts and Nevis each have a two-party system, which means that there are two dominant political parties, with extreme difficulty for anybody to achieve electoral success under the banner of any other party.

== Latest election ==
Party	Votes	%	Seats	+/–
Saint Kitts and Nevis Labour Party	13,438	45.75	6	+4
People's Labour Party	5,036	17.14	1	–1
People's Action Movement	4,737	16.13	1	–3
Concerned Citizens' Movement	3,473	11.82	3	0
Nevis Reformation Party	2,616	8.91	0	0
Moral Restoration Movement	67	0.23	0	New
Unity Labour Party	5	0.02	0	New
Independents	3	0.01	0	0
Appointed and ex-officio members			4	0
Total	29,375	100.00	15	0
Valid votes	29,375	99.39		
Invalid/blank votes	179	0.61		
Total votes	29,554	100.00		
Registered voters/turnout		–		

== See also ==
- Electoral calendar
- Electoral system
