= Elections in Saint Vincent and the Grenadines =

Saint Vincent and the Grenadines elects a legislature on the national level. The House of Assembly has 21 seats: 15 members elected for a five-year term in single seat constituencies and six appointed senators. Saint Vincent and the Grenadines has a two-party system, which means that there are two dominant political parties, with extreme difficulty for anybody to achieve electoral success under the banner of any other party.

== Latest elections ==
Party	Votes	%	Seats	+/–
New Democratic Party	37,207	57.74	14	+8
Unity Labour Party	27,152	42.14	1	–8
Independents	80	0.12	0	0
Total	64,439	100.00	15	0
Valid votes	64,439	99.54		
Invalid/blank votes	297	0.46		
Total votes	64,736	100.00		
Registered voters/turnout	103,524	62.53		
Source: Electoral Office

== See also ==
- Electoral calendar
- Electoral system
