= 2011 Irish constitutional referendums =

Two constitutional referendums were held simultaneously in Ireland on 27 October 2011, each on a proposed amendment of the Constitution of Ireland. The proposed amendments are on judicial salaries pay cuts, and to provide additional powers to Oireachtas committees.

They were held on the same day as the 2011 presidential election and a Dáil by-election in Dublin West. An application to prevent both referendums from going ahead was refused by the Supreme Court on 26 October 2011. The Irish Council for Civil Liberties said the information provided to voters in advance of polling in the two constitutional referendums was "tardy and inadequate".

== Twenty-ninth Amendment ==
The Twenty-ninth Amendment is a proposal to remove the ban on reducing judicial salaries. This became contentious in the context of widespread salary cuts during the Irish financial crisis.

Under the Constitution a judge's salary may not be reduced during their term of office. This is intended to protect the independence of the judiciary and prevent governments from imposing pay cuts as a reprisal for judgments with which they disagree.

The amendment was passed.

Twenty-Ninth Amendment of the Constitution Bill 2011
Choice	Votes	%
For	1,393,877	79.74
Against	354,134	20.26
Total	1,748,011	100.00
Valid votes	1,748,011	97.89
Invalid/blank votes	37,696	2.11
Total votes	1,785,707	100.00
Registered voters/turnout	3,191,157	55.96

== Thirtieth Amendment ==
The Thirtieth Amendment is a proposal to grant full investigative powers to Oireachtas committees investigating matters of public interest.

The Supreme Court of Ireland found the Oireachtas did not have an inherent power to conduct inquiries, and that it overstepped its jurisdiction when it set up the Abbeylara inquiry into the shooting of John Carthy in Abbeylara, County Longford, in 2000.

The amendment was rejected.

Thirtieth Amendment of the Constitution Bill 2011
Choice	Votes	%
For	812,008	46.66
Against	928,175	53.34
Total	1,740,183	100.00
Valid votes	1,740,183	97.48
Invalid/blank votes	45,025	2.52
Total votes	1,785,208	100.00
Registered voters/turnout	3,191,157	55.94

== Referendum Commissions ==
Separate Referendum Commissions were established for the two referendums, on 5 September for the 29th Amendment and on 13 September for the 30th Amendment. The commissions have the same membership, being chaired by retired judge Bryan McMahon, with ex-officio members the clerks of Dáil Éireann and Seanad Éireann, the Ombudsman, and the Comptroller and Auditor General. The dedicated website, www.referendum2011.ie, was set up by the Referendum Commission.

== See also ==
- Constitutional amendment
- Politics of the Republic of Ireland
- History of the Republic of Ireland
