= Elections in Dominica =

Elections in Dominica have been taking place since 1832. Dominica elects on national level a legislature. The House of Assembly has 32 members, 21 members elected for a five-year term in single-seat constituencies, 9 appointed senators, the Speaker and 1 ex officio member. A head of state—the president—is elected by the House of Assembly.

Dominica has a two-party system, which means that there are two dominant political parties, with extreme difficulty for anybody to achieve electoral success under the banner of any other party. Dominica was once a three-party system until the Dominica Labour Party and the greatly diminished Dominica Freedom Party formed a coalition government. The DFP has failed to acquire any seats for two elections straight, leaving the United Workers' Party as the only opposition to the DLP.

== Latest elections ==
| Party | Votes | % | Seats | +/– |
|---|---|---|---|---|
| Dominica Labour Party | 15,214 | 82.38 | 19 | +1 |
| Team Unity Dominica | 153 | 0.83 | 0 | New |
| Independents | 3,102 | 16.80 | 2 | New |
| Total | 18,469 | 100.00 | 21 | 0 |
| Valid votes | 18,469 | 96.87 | | |
| Invalid/blank votes | 597 | 3.13 | | |
| Total votes | 19,066 | 100.00 | | |
| Registered voters/turnout | 60,330 | 31.60 | | |
Source: Electoral Office

== See also ==
- Electoral calendar
- Electoral system
