= 2011 Liechtenstein referendums =

Registered Partnership Law
For	68.76%
Against	31.24%

Allowing abortion within the first twelve weeks of pregnancy
For	47.66%
Against	52.34%

Building a new national hospital in Vaduz
For	41.91%
Against	58.09%
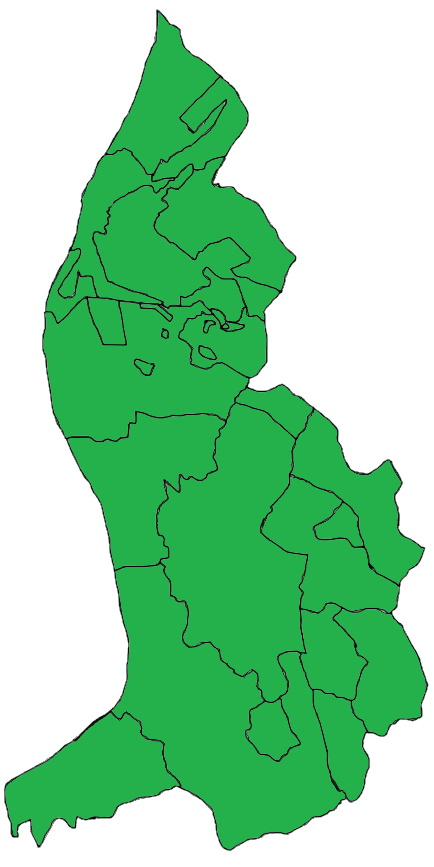
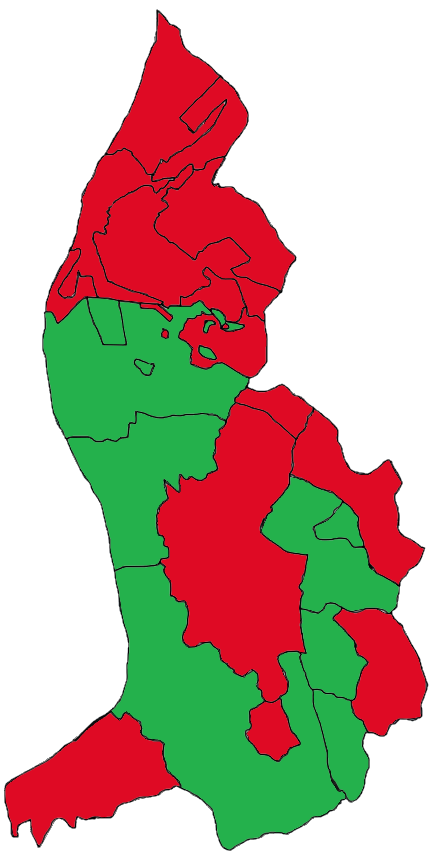
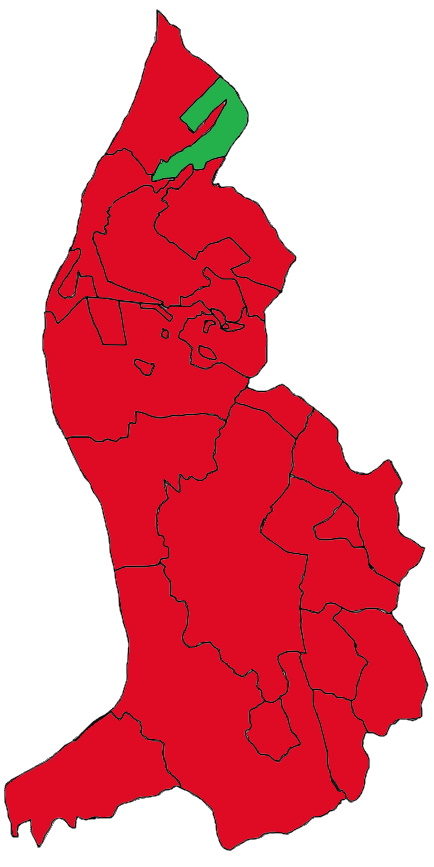
- Results by municipality for Registered Partnership Law (left), abortion (center) and new hospital (right)

Three referendums were held in Liechtenstein during 2011. The first on approving the registered partnership law was held between 17 and 19 June, and was approved by 68.8% of voters. The law went into effect on 1 September. The second was held on 18 September on allowing abortion within the first twelve weeks of pregnancy. The third, on building a new national hospital in Vaduz, was held on 30 October. The abortion referendum and the hospital referendum were both rejected.

== Registered partnership law ==
The registered partnership law (Lebenspartnerschaft) was passed unanimously by the Landtag of Liechtenstein in the second reading on March 16 and published on March 21, 2011. However, the group Vox Populi, led by a cousin of archbishop Wolfgang Haas, announced its intention to force a referendum. According to the constitution, the organisation had until 21 April (30 days) to collect at least 1000 signatures. Because the necessary signatures were gathered (1208 valid signatures), a referendum was held on the evening of 17 June and the morning of 19 June 2011.

=== Campaign ===
The registered partnership law was supported by the government and all parties in the Landtag, but opposed by the socially conservative advocacy group "Vox Populi" and the Roman Catholic Archdiocese of Vaduz.

== Abortion ==
Prince Alois had threatened to veto the result of the referendum should it have turned out in favour, but ultimately it was rejected by voters.

== New hospital ==
On 28 June the Landtag passed a bill approving spending 83 million francs on the construction of a national hospital in Vaduz by 14 votes to 11. A request for an advisory referendum was rejected by 12 votes to 11, but a committee gathered 2,951 signatures between 8 July and 3 August, forcing a referendum.

== Results ==
=== Registered partnerships ===
The referendum achieved a turnout of about 70 percent as of Friday evening because of a large majority of voters who had already used postal voting. Total turnout was 74.2 percent.

Choice	Votes	%
For	9,239	68.76
Against	4,197	31.24
Total	13,436	100.00
Valid votes	13,436	96.14
Invalid/blank votes	540	3.86
Total votes	13,976	100.00
Registered voters/turnout	18,840	74.18
Source: Direct Democracy

=== Abortion ===
Choice	Votes	%
For	5,246	47.66
Against	5,762	52.34
Total	11,008	100.00
Valid votes	11,008	94.90
Invalid/blank votes	592	5.10
Total votes	11,600	100.00
Registered voters/turnout	18,919	61.31
Source: Direct Democracy

=== National hospital ===
Choice	Votes	%
For	5,411	41.91
Against	7,499	58.09
Total	12,910	100.00
Valid votes	12,910	96.30
Invalid/blank votes	496	3.70
Total votes	13,406	100.00
Registered voters/turnout	18,941	70.78
Source: Direct Democracy
