= Elections in Bahrain =

The National Assembly is bicameral with the lower house, the Chamber of Deputies, having 40 members elected in single-seat constituencies for a four-year term. The upper house, the Shura Council, has 40 members appointed by the King of Bahrain, with the stated aim of giving a voice to minority communities and technocratic experts within the legislative process. Supporters of the system refer to long established democracies the United Kingdom and Canada operating with this bicameralism with an appointed upper chamber and an elected lower chamber. Opponents of this system point out that unlike the bicameral systems in the UK and Canada, the Bahraini system gives the unelected upper house equal or more legislative power than the elected lower house, allowing the King to control all legislation. Opponents also point out that the current system was imposed unilaterally by the King, violating the 1973 Constitution and a 2001 signed agreement with the Bahraini opposition.

Bahrain's electoral framework is unfair, with electoral districts deliberately designed to underrepresent Shiites, who form a majority of the citizen population. The government has also allegedly drawn district boundaries to put certain political societies, including leftist and Sunni Islamist groups, at a disadvantage. The government agency responsible for administering elections is not an independent and is headed by the justice minister, a member of the royal family.

== Latest elections ==
Six candidates, one of them female, were announced to have won seats in the first round; the remaining seats had to be contested in second-round runoff votes. The government reported that turnout among eligible voters was 73%, up from 67% in the 2018 election.
