= Elections in Liechtenstein =

Elections in Liechtenstein take place at a national level within a multi-party system, with two dominant political parties. The Landtag of Liechtenstein has 25 members, elected for a four-year term by proportional representation in two multi-seat constituencies. The country also holds mayoral and municipal elections for four-year terms.

The country replaced universal male suffrage with universal suffrage, following a national referendum.

== Electoral process ==
Electoral map of Liechtenstein

A variation of the standard party-list proportional format is used to elect 15 members from the district of Oberland and 10 members from the district of Unterland. The highest-remainder method dictates each party's seat total in a district based on their vote share (which will be covered in more detail) there. Elections in these two districts are essentially separate, and the individual municipal divisions technically play no role in determining the eventual winners.

There are four parties currently registered in Liechtenstein: the Progressive Citizen's Party (FBP), Patriotic Union (VU), the Independents (DU), and Free List (FL). Each party may nominate as many candidates in a district as can be elected there (15 available for Oberland and 10 for Unterland). Voters are assigned voting locations (either Oberland or Unterland district) based on their living. When voting, each voter must choose one party but is allowed to select as many candidates as they like (but only up to the maximum given: 15 candidate votes per Oberland voter and 10 candidate votes for each Unterland voter).

Any ballots without a single party mark at the top are considered void, but will be accepted no matter how many candidates are chosen. If more candidates are chosen than the limit, the candidates following the fifteenth (if in Oberland) or tenth (if in Unterland) are ignored and only the first 15 (Oberland) or 10 (Unterland) distinct choices will count. If the name of a candidate is repeated, only in the first instance where the candidate is named is taken into consideration and all subsequent mentions are ignored.

Although the number of candidates selected by each voter can vary and is up to their own determination, Oberland voters still must cast 15 total votes, and Unterland voters always give 10. The difference is made through the candidate rankings, which will be discussed later. Each candidate that is chosen by a voter counts as a vote for that candidate's party. Each remaining vote out of the 15 (for Oberland) or 10 (for Unterland) corresponding to the number of candidates not chosen counts as a vote for the party initially specified by the voter.

For example, if a voter from Oberland chooses the FBP as their party of choice, and then chooses 4 candidates from the VU, 2 candidates from the FBP, and 1 candidate from the DU, then the party votes that this voter has cast are 4 for the VU, 1 for the DU, and 10 for the FBP (by virtue of the 2 votes for candidates from this party and the 8 remaining, empty candidate votes).

Once the number of seats for each party in every district has been determined by the party vote count in that district, the corresponding candidates of that party with the highest number of votes are elected. For example, if the VU is given three seats in Unterland, then the 3 most popular VU candidates in Unterland are elected as the 3 representatives of the VU from the Unterland, regardless of how many votes these candidates garnered in relation to candidates from other parties.

If a party is given more seats in a district than the number of candidates that it has nominated there, then the extra seats are redistributed to the other parties as if the party of concern had not received that many votes also by using the Hare quota. In this case, the maximum number of seats that this party can earn in the relevant district is also equivalent to the total candidates it has nominated there.

Votes for a party and votes for candidates are separate and affect the count differently: as explained above, party votes are used only for determining the number of seats given to a party in either district, while candidate votes determine who is elected from each party.

The two larger parties (FBP and VU) traditionally form a coalition government, with the Prime Minister, two ministers and the President of the Landtag from the winning party (the party with most seats) and two ministers and Landtag Deputy President from the other. The two parties held a coalition government since 1938, except for 1997–2005.

== General election results ==
The following graph depicts general election results since the introduction of the proportional representation system in 1945:

View source data.

== See also ==
- Electoral calendar
- Electoral system
