= Elections in Vietnam =

The National Assembly House of Vietnam with posters promoting the 2026 Vietnamese elections.

Elections in the Socialist Republic of Vietnam are held under a one-party political system led by the Communist Party of Vietnam (CPV). Direct elections take place at both the local and national levels to elect members of the People's Councils and the National Assembly, with all candidate nominations pre-approved by the CPV-led Vietnamese Fatherland Front. Elections serve the purposes of information acquisition and cooptation rather than popularity contest but still remain of significance to the political life and legitimacy of the Vietnamese party-state.

== General ==
The President of Vietnam (Chủ tịch nước) is elected by the National Assembly. The Prime Minister of Vietnam (Thủ tướng) and Chief Justice (Chánh án Tối cao) of Vietnam are appointed by the President and approved by the National Assembly. The ministers are then appointed by the Prime Minister and also approved by the National Assembly.

In the May 20th 2007 election, the Vietnamese Fatherland Front, consisting of the Communist Party of Vietnam, participated alongside affiliated groups and organisations; The 875 candidates for 500 seats included 150 who are not Communist Party members, but have party approval to run. Thirty candidates were allowed to enter on their own, their nominations approved by colleagues and neighbours. In March 2023, the National Assembly elected Võ Văn Thưởng as the country's president, which is a mostly ceremonial role.

== Electoral system ==
The deputies of the National Assembly are elected using a block voting system from multi-member electoral units. The National Election Council is the authority which puts rules and guidelines into effect, as well as overseeing general elections in the country. The nomination process is controlled by the Vietnam Fatherland Front, who holds consultative conferences to narrow down a field of candidates for election. The selection process takes into account factors such as proportional representation from the major regions of the country, gender balance, and the inclusion of ethnic minorities as well as representation of mass organizations. Generally, 90% of seats are directly reserved for the Communist Party of Vietnam, with the remaining 10% reserved for non-party members approved by the Fatherland Front.

== Local election ==
The people's Council (Hội đồng Nhân dân) is the local legislature of provinces and municipalities of Vietnam. The people's councils represent the local authority of the state and are the top supervisory bodies at each level. They do not govern directly but instead elect and oversee people's committees that act as executive bodies and carry out local administrative duties; council members are elected via a direct system for a five-year term. The number of representatives depends on the population of that province or municipality. One councilor is elected chairman.

The People's Council elects the People's Committee (Ủy ban Nhân dân) the executive power. The People's Committee consists of a Chairman and a number of commissioners.

The Judge of the People's Court (Tòa án Nhân dân) of each province or municipality is appointed by the Chief Justice of the Supreme People's Court of Vietnam.

== Latest elections ==
=== Legislative election ===
Party	Seats
Communist Party of Vietnam	482
Non-party members	18
Total	500

== See also ==
- Electoral calendar
- Electoral system
- Politics of Vietnam
