= Elections in Palau =

On a national level, the citizens of Palau elect a president, who serves a four-year term, and acts as head of state. A national bicameral legislature, is also elected, consisting of the Palau National Congress (Olbiil era Kelulau) and the Senate of Palau. The National Congress has 16 members, each serving four-year terms in single-seat constituencies. The Senate has 9 members, also serving four-year terms in single-seat constituencies.
