= Elections in Cape Verde =

Cape Verde elects on national level a head of state – the president – and a legislature. The president is elected for a five-year term by the people. The National Assembly (Portuguese: Assembleia Nacional) has 72 members, elected for a five-year term by proportional representation. Cape Verde has a two-party system, which means that there are two dominant political parties, with extreme difficulty for anybody to achieve electoral success under the banner of any other party.

== Latest elections ==
=== Presidential ===
Candidate	Party	Votes	%
José Maria Neves	African Party for the Independence of Cape Verde	96,035	51.79
Carlos Veiga	Movement for Democracy	78,603	42.39
Casimiro de Pina	Independent	3,345	1.80
Fernando Rocha Delgado	Independent	2,518	1.36
Hélio Sanches	Independent	2,134	1.15
Gilson dos Santos Alves	Independent	1,410	0.76
Joaquim Monteiro	Independent	1,403	0.76
Total		185,448	100.00
Valid votes		185,448	96.92
Invalid votes		1,592	0.83
Blank votes		4,295	2.24
Total votes		191,335	100.00
Registered voters/turnout		398,690	47.99
Source: CNE

=== Parliamentary ===
98.80% reporting
Party	Votes	%	Seats
African Party for the Independence of Cape Verde	89,426	47.91	35
Movement for Democracy	83,618	44.80	31
Democratic and Independent Cape Verdean Union	9,807	5.25	2
Labour and Solidarity Party	3,262	1.75	0
People's Party	524	0.28	0
Total	186,637	100.00	68
Valid votes	186,637	97.55	
Invalid votes	2,011	1.05	
Blank votes	2,679	1.40	
Total votes	191,327	100.00	
Registered voters/turnout	411,401	46.51	
Source: CNE

== See also ==
- 2016 Cape Verdean local elections
- Electoral calendar
- Electoral system
