= Elections in São Tomé and Príncipe =

São Tomé and Príncipe elects on the national level a head of state – the president – and a legislature. The president is elected for a five-year term by the people. The National Assembly (Assembleia Nacional) has 55 members, elected for a four-year term in seven multi-member constituencies by proportional representation. São Tomé and Príncipe has a multi-party system. The most recent legislative elections took place on the 25th of September 2022. Elections also happen on the regional and municipal level.

== Latest elections ==
=== Presidential ===
On 18 July 2021 the first round of the presidential election was held. As no presidential candidate received a majority of the vote, a second round was originally scheduled to be held on 8 August 2021. However, following an objection to the first-round result, the second round was postponed to 29 August 2021, and later postponed again to 5 September 2021.

The second round was won by Carlos Vila Nova of Independent Democratic Action, who received 58% of the vote, defeating Guilherme Posser da Costa of the MLSTP/PSD.

=== Legislative ===
On 25 September 2022 the Independent Democratic Action won 30 seats and the MLSTP–PSD won 18 seats of the 55 seats in the National Assembly.

== See also ==
- Electoral calendar
- Electoral system
