= Elections in Morocco =

Elections in Morocco are held at the national, regional, and local levels. At the national level, they are used to elect members of the Parliament, which is bicameral and consists of two chambers.

The House of Representatives (Majlis al-Nuwab) has 395 members elected for a five-year term. Members are elected through a proportional representation system in multi-member constituencies, including national lists reserved for women and youth.

The House of Councillors (Majlis al-Mustasharin) has 120 members elected for a six-year term through indirect elections. Its members are chosen by local authorities, professional chambers, and representatives of employees.

Morocco has operated under a multi-party system since 1956, with numerous political parties. No single party typically secures an absolute majority, and parties often form coalition governments.

Morocco considers Western Sahara part of its territory and occupies a significant portion of it, where elections are also held.

== List of national elections ==
=== 2021 general election ===
Party	Regional lists			Local lists			Total seats
Party	Votes	%	Seats	Votes	%	Seats	Total seats
National Rally of Independents	2,088,548	27.58	16	2,099,036	27.69	86	102
Authenticity and Modernity Party	1,385,230	18.30	12	1,400,122	18.47	75	87
Istiqlal Party	1,267,866	16.74	13	1,278,420	16.87	68	81
Socialist Union of Popular Forces	590,215	7.80	11	598,293	7.89	23	34
Popular Movement (Morocco)	528,261	6.98	8	534,292	7.05	20	28
Constitutional Union (Morocco)	423,067	5.59	5	418,945	5.53	13	18
Party of Progress and Socialism	389,802	5.15	10	378,603	5.00	12	22
Justice and Development Party (Morocco)	325,337	4.30	9	322,758	4.26	4	13
Democratic and Social Movement (Morocco)	138,648	1.83	2	126,399	1.67	3	5
Federation of the Democratic Left	83,554	1.10	1	83,130	1.10	0	1
Unified Socialist Party (Morocco)	69,678	0.92	1	60,313	0.80	0	1
Front of Democratic Forces	64,317	0.85	2	70,218	0.93	1	3
New Democrats Party	31,258	0.41	0	32,295	0.43	0	0
Environment and Sustainable Development Party	23,813	0.31	0	22,959	0.30	0	0
Social Centre Party	17,886	0.24	0	11,968	0.16	0	0
Hope Party (Morocco)	17,855	0.24	0	17,262	0.23	0	0
Equity Party	17,500	0.23	0	16,358	0.22	0	0
Moroccan Liberal Party	17,116	0.23	0	18,884	0.25	0	0
Unity and Democracy Party (Morocco)	16,969	0.22	0	12,841	0.17	0	0
Moroccan Greens Party	12,733	0.17	0	15,639	0.21	0	0
Democratic Independence Party	12,448	0.16	0	8,328	0.11	0	0
Party of Liberty and Social Justice	10,299	0.14	0	7,719	0.10	0	0
Action Party (Morocco)	9,022	0.12	0	6,373	0.08	0	0
Reform and Development Party (Morocco)	7,724	0.10	0	9,891	0.13	0	0
Renaissance Party	6,679	0.09	0	5,730	0.08	0	0
Democratic Society Party	5,883	0.08	0	3,885	0.05	0	0
Party of Renaissance and Virtue	5,208	0.07	0	8,181	0.11	0	0
National Democratic Party (Morocco)	4,707	0.06	0	1,682	0.02	0	0
Moroccan Union for Democracy	0	0.00	0	7,983	0.11	0	0
Democratic Agreement Party	0	0.00	0	998	0.01	0	0
Total	7,571,623	100.00	90	7,579,505	100.00	305	395

=== 1963 general election ===
Party	Votes	%	Seats
Front for the Defence of Constitutional Institutions	1,159,932	34.78	69
Istiqlal Party	1,000,506	30.00	41
National Union of Popular Forces	751,056	22.52	28
Moroccan Communist Party	2,345	0.07	0
Independents	421,479	12.64	6
Total	3,335,318	100.00	144

== Controversies ==
In October 2006, as many as 67 people were arrested for election fraud allegations related to the September 8, 2006 polls. Among them there were 17 lawmakers (12 from the Assembly of Councillors and 5 from the Assembly of Representatives). It was the first time the Moroccan government made such arrests.

== See also ==
- Elections in Western Sahara
- Electoral calendar
- Electoral system
