= Elections in Laos =

Laos elects a legislature nationally and the public also participates in the election of village heads. The National Assembly (Sapha Heng Xat) has 164 members, elected for five year terms.

Laos is a one-party state. According to the constitution, elections are in accordance with the principles of democratic centralism and the Lao People's Revolutionary Party serves as the "leading nucleus" of the political system.

The last elections were held on 22 February 2026. The Lao People's Revolutionary Party (LPRP) took 169 seats in the 175-member National Assembly while the six remaining seats went to independents.

== Latest election ==
Party	Votes	%	Seats	+/–
Lao People's Revolutionary Party			169	+11
Independents			6	0
Total			175	+11
Total votes	4,670,050	–		
Registered voters/turnout	4,764,384	98.02		
Source: Xinhua, VietnamPlus

== See also ==
- Parliament of the Kingdom of Laos
