= Vote linkage =

Partially compensatory electoral system

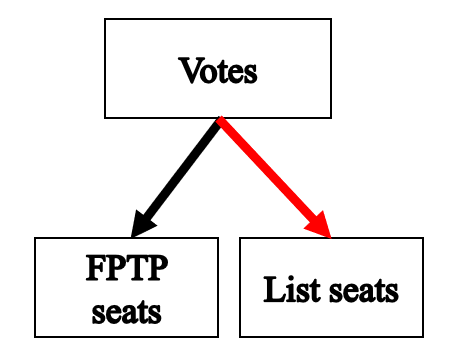
A diagram of a simple single vote vote linkage system. Only votes considered not used (wasted) are used to apportion party-list seats.

The vote linkage or (multi-tier) vote transfer system is type of compensatory mixed electoral system, where votes may be transferred across multiple tiers of an electoral system, in order to avoid wasted votes - in contrast to the more common seat linkage compensatory system (commonly referred to as MMP). It often presupposes and is related to the concept of the mixed single vote, which means that the same vote can be used in multiple tiers of an electoral system and that a vote for a local candidate may automatically count as a vote for the candidate's party or the other way around (Note: However, even vote linkage systems making use of the mixed single vote may not necessarily use only one vote, but in this case at least one of the votes be a mixed single vote.). Voters usually cast their single vote for a local candidate in a single-member district (SMD) and then all the wasted votes from this lower tier are added to distribute seats between upper tier candidates, typically national party lists.

Partially compensatory multi-tier vote linkage is an equivalent of the indirect single transferable vote among multi-tiered electoral systems (except for the mixed ballot transferable vote versions, which are multi-tier equivalents to STV). A related concept is seat linkage, where it is not the votes used in one tier that connect two tiers, but the number of seats a party achieved on the lower tier that is taken into account. A vote linkage system, when applied in a compensatory way takes into account the number of votes that were effective or wasted in the lower tier and takes this into account in the apportionment of the upper tier.

Vote linkage systems currently or formerly used for various national or local elections in Germany, Hungary and Italy have been sometimes described as mixed-majoritarian (similar to common versions of parallel voting), or a unique system between MMM and MMP (seat linkage). Some supermixed systems use vote linkage together with parallel voting (superposition) in a two-vote setup, where split ticket voting is allowed. How proportional the outcome depends on many factors including the vote transfer rules, such which votes are recounted as party list votes, and other parameters (e.g. the number of list seats) used in the system. The vote linkage system originates from Germany and is currently used in Hungary. A version called scorporo was also used in Italy from 1993 to 2005.

== Example ==
Party	Popular vote	District results			Without winner compensation					With winner compensation				
Party	Popular vote	District results			Transfer votes			Seats		Transfer votes			Seats	
Party	Popular vote	Party A strongholds (40)	Party B strongholds (20)	Seats	Party A strongholds (40)	Party B strongholds (20)	Total	List tier	Total	Party A strongholds (40)	Party B strongholds (20)	Total	List tier	Total
Party A	41%	45%	33%	40	-	33%	11%	8	48	20%	33%	24%	13	53
Party B	30%	25%	40%	20	25%	-	17%	12	32	25%	7%	19%	11	31
Party C	25%	25%	25%	0	25%	25%	25%	17	17	25%	25%	25%	14	14
Party D	4%	5%	2%	0	5%	2%	4%	3	3	5%	2%	4%	2	2
TOTAL	100%	100%	100%	60	55%	60%	57%	40	100	75%	67%	72%	40	100

=== Compared to other mixed systems ===
Party	Popular vote	District results			Seats under parallel voting: no compensation; (mixed-member majoritarian system)		Vote transfer system without winner compensation		Vote transfer system with winner compensation		Seats under single vote seat linkage compensation (mixed-member proportional system)	
Party	Popular vote	Party A strongholds	Party B strongholds	Seats	List tier	Total	List tier	Total	List tier	Total	List tier	Total
Party A	41%	45%	33%	40	16	56	8	48	13	53	1	41
Party B	30%	25%	40%	20	12	32	12	32	11	31	10	30
Party C	25%	25%	25%	0	10	10	17	17	14	14	25	25
Party D	4%	5%	2%	0	2	2	3	3	2	2	6	6
TOTAL	100%	100%	100%	100	40	100	40	100	40	100	40	100

== Terminology ==
Mixed single vote systems may use vote linkage compensation, meaning not all, but only 'wasted' votes get transferred as list votes to the other tier. Some uncommon, supermixed systems use of MSV may add or subtract the discounted list results to establish a vote linkage based element of compensation into system that would otherwise be categorised as parallel voting. Either type of system is misleadingly known in Hungarian as a "fractional vote recounting system" (Hungarian: töredékszavat-visszaszámláló rendszer), however, there are no fractional votes used in any variation, the name merely alluding to only a fraction of votes being "recounted" as list votes.

The third type of mixed single vote system is the single vote equivalent of parallel voting (sometimes called direct vote transfer), which uses the same vote on both the majoritarian and proportional tiers. This makes such systems non-compensatory, falling under the superposition type of mixed systems identified by Massicotte & Blais.

Compensatory mixed systems
	single vote systems (mixed single vote)	dual vote systems
Seat linkage	Single vote seat linkage MMP (top-up MSV): 50-point proportional representation	Seat linkage two vote MMP: mixed-member proportional representation (MMP); additional member system (AMS); alternative vote plus (AV+)
Seat linkage	Single vote seat linkage MMP (top-up MSV): 50-point proportional representation	Hybrids: e.g. parallel voting+AMS (South Korea)
Vote linkage	Positive vote transfer system (PVT): Hungarian PVT (local elections)	Supermixed: parallel voting+PVT (Hungary - national elections); negative vote transfer/scorporo (Italy, 1993–2005)
Vote linkage	Positive vote transfer system (PVT): Hungarian PVT (local elections)	mixed ballot transferable vote (MBTV)
Seat linkage and vote linkage	Dual-member proportional (DMP)	Modified Bavarian MMP Schulze MMP
Non-compensatory mixed systems
	single vote systems	dual vote systems
No linkage	mixed single vote, unlinked versions (MSV): single vote parallel voting (Tanzania, Seychelles)	parallel voting
Vote linkage (direct vote transfer)	mixed single vote, superposition: Italian variant (Rosatellum)	-

=== Positive and negative vote transfer ===
The first recorded mixed vote transfer systems (used in Germany) have been under the "losers plus surplus" model, therefore, they inherently included "winner compensation". Under later definitions of certain sources, this model would also be retroactively a "negative vote transfer system" despite not using any votes with negative transfer value. The confusion stems from the terms "positive" and "negative vote transfer system" being coined based on the systems in use in the 1990s and early 2000s in Hungary and Italy and the inconsistent terminology of sources on these niche variants. While all the Hungarian versions primarily transferred votes with a positive value and the votes transferred were almost exclusively in compensation for losing candidates, the Italian models of scorporo operated only with a negative value and deducted all or a part of votes cast for local winners.

In one view, positive vote transfer means vote transfer with only positive votes value, with or without winner compensation (which may be itself positive or negative). This means that either only the positive transfer votes are used on the list tier to apportion seats (Hungarian local elections), or they are added to other (direct) list votes (Hungarian national elections). Negative vote transfer systems, meanwhile use the opposite principle, they subtract exactly those votes (from the direct list votes), which the equivalent positive vote transfer would not transfer. In this way, these systems rely on negative value winner compensation, which is their most important property that determines how they can be manipulated.

Votes used to allocate list seats under	Positive vote transfer system		Negative vote transfer system
Votes used to allocate list seats under	Standalone	Supermixed	Supermixed
Without winner compensation	Only votes of losing candidates Used in: Hungarian local elections	Direct list votes + votes for losing candidates Used in: Hungarian national elections (formerly)	Direct list votes: votes for winning candidates excluding surplus votes Used in: Italian Senate (formerly)
With winner compensation	Votes for losing candidates + surplus votes of winning candidates (e.g. votes of the winner above votes of the second placed candidate + 1)	Direct list votes + votes for losing candidates + surplus votes of winning candidates (e.g. votes of the winner above votes of the second placed candidate + 1) Used in: Hungarian national elections (currently)	Direct list votes: votes for winning candidates Used in: Italian Chamber of Deputies (formerly)

In some sources, the Hungarian model of "losers only" has been labeled "positive vote transfer", under this view the Italian Senate model, despite using only negative transfer votes would also be PVT, since it operates under the same "losers only" principle (deducting all of winners votes from the list vote). Conversely "negative vote transfer" means not only the Italian Chamber model of scorporo is (deducting the non-surplus votes of winners), but the original German variants and the current Hungarian electoral systems for national elections (it uses winner compensation with positive value). A third term of "direct vote transfer" has been used for vote transfer systems without compensation (mixed single vote equivalent of parallel voting). This view has been criticized for using unintuitive terminology and not including models of winner compensation other than the surplus votes compared to the second place candidate. This article uses the former view to maintain consistency and to show the significance of positive/negative transfers on manipulation more intuitively.

=== Controversy on winner compensation ===
Though the original vote linkage systems used the "losers plus surplus" model, the systems established in Hungary only used votes cast for losing candidates on the (relatively small sized) compensatory tier of the electoral systems. For this reason, when the system for the National Assembly was changed by the governing parties before the 2014 election, the introduction of transferring surplus votes (with a positive value) was a novel element in the system. This element was soon called "winner compensation" (mostly by its critics), who claimed it was effectively a majority bonus. Together with other criticisms of the change (suspicions of gerrymandering, moving towards an even more mixed-majoritarian system, postal voting for non-resident citizens only etc.) this was viewed as a thinly veiled attempt to benefit the parties who created the system, without meaningful consultation of the opposition.

=== Similar proportional systems ===
Some non-mixed systems, which use multi-member constituencies either on their single tier or also on their lower tier use vote linkage. An example is the national remnant system of Weimar Germany. This system used an absolute quota (not dependent on the vote shares in the district, rather a fixed number of votes) instead of plurality to elect candidates. With the fixed quota and a changing population, this meant a flexible parliament size.

The vote transfer to party list is the mixed single vote equivalent to indirect single transferable voting, while the direct equivalent to the single transfer vote is the mixed ballot transferable vote.

== Advantages and disadvantages ==
The features of vote linkage compensatory systems are similar to those of comparable parallel voting or mixed-member proportional systems, depending on which systems does the result more resemble. As mixed systems they usually inherit properties of their subsystems, in case of the most commonly used vote linkage systems, these are first preference plurality (in single-member districts) and closed list PR. Single vote variants also suffer from the disadvantages of the mixed single vote, however in certain systems this also gives robusticity against strategic manipulation.

=== Representation for smaller parties ===
Vote linkage systems generally give greater representation to smaller parties than parallel voting with the same amount of list seats, but usually not as much as comparable seat linkage systems - they usually cannot guarantee overall proportionality. Large parties can win very large majorities, disproportionate to their percentage vote, especially when vote linkage is employed in a supermixed system combined with parallel voting (such as in Hungary and Italy). In Hungary for example, in last 3 elections have resulted in a 2/3 supermajority of seats for the most popular list from at low as 45% of the vote in 2014.

=== Two types of representatives ===
Because some candidates are elected from constituencies and some from a list, there is a critique that two classes of representatives will emerge under any mixed system, including vote linkage ones: One class beholden to their electorate seat, and the other concerned only with their party. Some consider this as an advantage as local as well as national interests will be represented. Some prefer systems where every constituency and therefore every constituent has only one representative, while others prefer a system where every MP represents the electorate as a whole as this is reflected in the electoral system as well, while a vote linkage mixed system provides a compromise between these two views.

=== Compared to seat linkage and parallel voting ===
Vote linkage systems can be compared to the mixed-member proportional systems (MMP)/ additional member system (AMS) and the common form of mixed-member majoritarian representation, parallel voting.

Like in parallel voting, a party that can gerrymander local districts can win more than its share of seats. So parallel systems need fair criteria to draw district boundaries. (Under MMP a gerrymander can help a local candidate, but it cannot raise a major party's share of seats, while under AMS the effects of gerrymandering are reduced by the compensation)

Seat linkage and vote linkage systems both suffer from different potential manipulation strategies arising from their compensatory component, which the following table shows. Parallel voting does not suffer from these by definition, since the worst case of strategic manipulation reverts compensatory systems to parallel voting.

	Seat linkage	Vote linkage		No linkage
	Seat linkage	without winner compensation	with winner compensation	parallel voting
Number of list seats needed for proportional results	Low	High	Very high	Extremely high (convergence, but never reaches)
Proportional if there are more list seats than needed?	Yes (stays proportional)	No (flips to opposite directional disproportionality)		Extremely high (convergence, but never reaches)
Types of manipulation strategies (arising from mixed system, not subsystems)	Decoy lists (less vulnerability if MSV)	Stronghold-split (capturing surplus votes) Only if there are too many list seats: transfer-vote strategy If there is negative vote transfer: decoy lists	Only if there are too many list seats: transfer-vote strategy If there is negative vote transfer: decoy lists	None (no compensation mechanism to subvert)
Vulnerability to strategic manipulation (subversion) of compensation if there are				N/A
few compensatory seats	High	Low	None/very low	N/A
many compensatory seats	Medium	Medium	Low	N/A
very many compensatory seats	Medium	High	Medium	N/A
Relevance of increased strategic voting / nomination in winner-take-all tier if there are (with no subversion of compensation)
few compensatory seats	Medium to almost none	Medium	High	Very high
many compensatory seats	Low to almost none	Low	Medium	High
very many compensatory seats	Very low to almost none	Low	Low	Medium

== Use ==
Country	Legislative body	In effect	Number of votes	System	Notes
(Germany) West Germany (formerly)	Some state parliaments (formerly): Bremen; Hamburg; Lower Saxony; Schleswig-Holstein	varied by state	One	Positive vote transfer with winner compensation	In Bremen and Hamburg, plurality was used in multi-member constituencies, though the latter switched to single-member constituencies in 1949.
(Hungary) Hungary	National Assembly	1990-2014	Two	Supermixed positive vote transfer (3 tiers) no winner compensation from local SMDs with negative winner compensation from regional PR tier	Modified two round system in SMDs
(Hungary) Hungary	National Assembly	2014-	Two	Supermixed positive vote transfer with positive winner compensation from local SMDs	
(Hungary) Hungary	Local elections municipalities and districts in the capital with a population over 10000	1990	One	Positive vote transfer no winner compensation	Before 1994 with a two-round system
(Hungary) Hungary	Budapest Assembly	2014 and 2018	One (DSV)	Positive vote transfer no winner compensation	-
(Italy) Italy (formerly)	Chamber of Deputies	1993-2005	Two	Negative vote transfer partial negative winner compensation	
(Italy) Italy (formerly)	Senate	1993-2005	One	Negative vote transfer full negative winner compensation	

=== West Germany ===
The first recorded use of a vote-transfer based mixed system was in British occupied West Germany. German opposition to a purely winner-take-all system like first-past-the-post, that the British preferred, necessitated a compromise. The vote transfer system which was of the "losers plus surplus model" included winner compensation and the majority of seats were won in single-member district would mostly keep the result as close to first-past-the-post as possible (see mixed-member majoritarian representation), while allowing for some compensatory representation of other parties ('The British called this a "modified PR system". The Germans more accurately (...) claimed that it was more like a modified majority system'). Since then, all German states that used such a system have changed either to either the seats linkage-based (and significantly more proportional) MMP or a pure party-list proportional system.

=== Hungary ===
A re-emergence of the vote linkage mixed system started in the turn of the 1990s, when politicians in Hungary, in transition to a democracy, were deliberating what electoral system to adopt. In this transition many aspects of constitutional and governmental structure were adopted from Germany. For the National Assembly, one of the most complicated supermixed systems was developed as a compromise between a winner-take-all and a purely proportional system. This system used a modified two-round system in single-member districts, regional lists and a small number of national compensatory seats based on the votes cast for losers in the local districts. The system, however, had some small negative value winner compensation from the party-list PR of the regional multi-member districts as well. Despite the sometimes highly disproportionate results, the system has often been mistaken for mixed-member proportional representation both inside and outside of Hungary, especially since it is common knowledge that it was derived from 'the' German system (hence the confusion with MMP). The losers only model because the predominant form of mixed system known and used in Hungary, with similar systems designed for local elections.

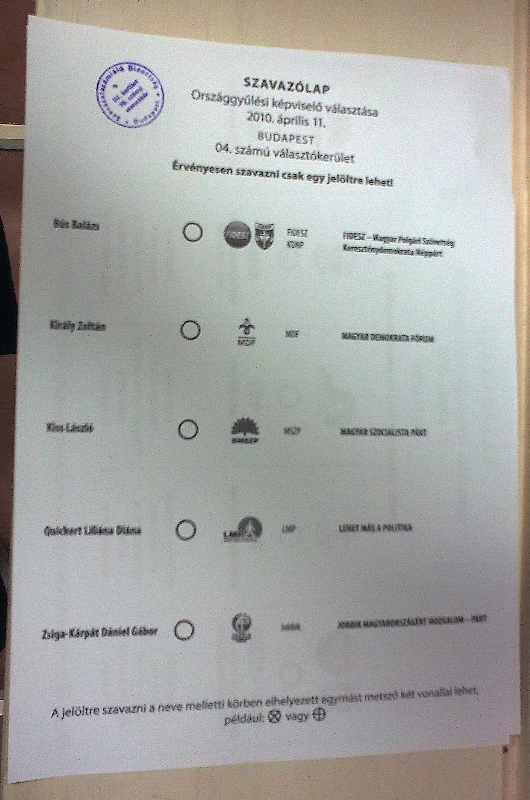
A ballot for electing a representative in an individual district in Hungary. In the 2010 election, this vote count would be counted again for the national compensatory tier, this time for the party associated with the candidate, unless the ballot was cast for the winning candidate.

The system for the National Assembly was in use until the elections of 2014, since which a simplified, but much more distinctly mixed-member majoritarian system is used.

==== National Assembly (general elections) ====
National Assembly elections use a positive vote transfer system, which also partially 'compensates' parties of winning candidates.

The compensatory tier of the National Assembly of Hungary is allocated to parties crossing a national 5% threshold. Votes of losing candidates as well as surplus votes of winning candidates are added to the list vote, making it a positive vote transfer system. Surplus votes are calculated by subtracting the result of the second-place candidate plus 1 from the result of the first place candidate, making the system similar to the Italian Chamber model of scorporo. However, because there are effectively no votes transferred with a negative value, the system is not subject to the same decoy list tactics as scorporo is. Instead, when decoy lists were mentioned in the context of the Hungarian system, it was in reference to the proliferation of unknown parties with similar names to known parties, fielding decoy lists (and decoy spoiler candidates) allegedly intended to confuse voters.

==== Local elections ====
Local elections in municipalities and districts in the capital with a population over 10 000 use a mixed single vote with positive vote transfer, where only votes for losing candidates are transferred to the compensatory tier. The vote transfer takes place based on the party affiliation of the local candidates and seats are allocated proportionally based on the transferred votes.

- Up to 25 000 residents 8 members are elected in SMDs and 3 members on the compensatory tier
- Up to 50 000 residents 10 members are elected in SMDs and 4 members on the compensatory tier
- Up to 75 000 residents 12 members are elected in SMDs and 5 members on the compensatory tier
- Up to 100 000 residents 14 members are elected in SMDs and 6 members on the compensatory tier
- Over 100 000 residents, the number of SMDs increases by 1 after every additional 10 000 residents, while the number of compensatory seats increases by 1 after every additional 25 000 residents.

For the 2014 and 2018 elections, General Assembly of Budapest was elected by a kind of mixed single vote, which served also as double simultaneous vote. The 23 directly elected mayors of the districts (plus the lord mayor) were ex officio members of the assembly alongside 9 members elected from compensation-lists of parties based on the votes cast for the mayoral candidates (Budapest mayor candidates and district mayor candidates could be listed on compensation-lists). The system was criticized for effectively using the vastly differently populated districts as electoral districts each election one member. For the 2024 election, the system was reverted to a direct election using party-list PR.

Because of the comparatively few compensatory seats, the system does not guarantee proportional results and commonly underrepresents smaller parties, however theoretically, it could also underrepresent larger parties compared to a list PR system.

=== Italy ===
A negative vote transfer system called scorporo was in force for elections to the bicameral Parliament of Italy based on Law 277/1993 from 1993 to 2005. Under this system, members could be elected in two ways:

- 75% of elected members were elected in single member districts (SMDs) using first-past-the-post voting.
- 25% of elected members were elected on list basis based on the proportion of the votes received by the party (using the D'Hondt method), with the exclusion of a proportion of any first-placed winner's votes.

The system was subject to the following specific rules for each chamber:

==== Senate ====
- List seats were calculated at the regional level.
- All votes for winning candidates were excluded from the list allocation.
- No threshold was applied for list seats.
- The SMD vote and the list vote were linked (mixed single vote) limiting the use of decoy lists (see below).

==== Chamber of Deputies ====
- The list seats were calculated at the national level.
- The number of SMD winner's votes excluded from the list vote was equal to the second place candidate's vote total, representing the number of votes needed to elect the winner in the SMD (i.e. non-wasted votes).
- A 4% threshold was established for parties to qualify for the list seats.
- The local vote and list vote were not tied to each other, thereby providing an incentive for decoy lists (see below).

==== Abolition ====
In the 2001 Italian general election, one of the two main coalitions (the House of Freedoms, which opposed the Scorporo system), linked many of their constituency candidates to a decoy list (lista civetta) for the proportional component, under the name Abolizione Scorporo (Abolish Scorporo). This list was not designed to win proportional seats, but only to soak up constituency votes for House of Freedoms, enabling them to win a larger share of the proportional list seats than they would be entitled to if all candidates were linked other House of Freedoms parties. This intentionally undermined the compensatory nature of the electoral system. As a defensive move, the other coalition, The Olive Tree, created their own decoy list under the name Paese Nuovo (New Country). This was facilitated by the fact that this particular scorporo system allowed the single-member constituency vote and the proportional list vote not to be linked. Decoy lists are a common issue in all compensatory and pseudo-compensatory systems, and this was not a unique problem for scorporo. Due to Silvio Berlusconi's opposition to the system, Italy changed to a majority bonus system in 2005.

== Proposals, mixed ballots and hybrids ==
Some properties of vote linkage, especially robusticity against certain types of tactical manipulation have led to social choice theorists to develop variations and hybrid using vote linkage. Golosov argued for the use of vote linkage via mixed single vote, developing a system which requires less compensatory seats but adequate proportionality as compromise alternative to conventional MMP systems. The mixed ballot transferable vote (MBTV) was proposed as a preferential variant of the mixed single vote where voters may indicate their preferences separately, and the original proposal also explores methods to make the system relatively proportional (as modifications to the systems used in Hungary).

A system using a mixed single vote in dual member districts (with local lists up to two candidates) called dual-member proportional has been proposed for Canada by Sean Graham. DMP uses both vote transfer (within districts) and seat linkage.

An open list variant of MMP (modified Bavarian MMP) has been proposed by Jameson Quinn which uses a mixed ballot and vote linkage combined with classical seat linkage.

1. If a ballot supports the winner in the local district, the list part of that ballot is counted for the party of that local winner. (This is inspired by exhausting ballots in STV, and reduces the chances of "overhang".)
2. If a ballot supports two different parties on its two halves, and exactly one of those two parties is nonviable (cannot win any seats), then it is counted as if both parts of that ballot supported the viable party. (This is inspired by transferring ballots in STV, and reduces the chances of "wasted/sub-threshold" voting power.

The vote linkage and seat linkage hybrid has been further refined by Markus Schulz, where in the proposed system uses STV on the local tier, and the votes for the local winner are only counted as votes for that candidate's party to the proportion as it is necessary to eliminate overhang seats. The proposal also contains a flexible number of leveling seats to ensure full proportionality.

== See also ==
- Scorporo (negative vote transfer systems)
- National remnant
- Additional member system
- Semi-proportional representation
- Mixed single vote
- List of electoral systems by country
