= Spare vote =

Electoral system thresholds

The spare vote refers to a secondary party vote considered for party-list proportional representation election systems. The party vote would come into play in the event that the main party vote is ineffective because that main party vote was for a party that failed to pass some kind of threshold. The vote's practical use may be understood by the phrase “If my first choice party fails to pass the threshold, my vote goes instead to my spare vote, that is my second choice of party”. The Spare vote overcomes, in a simple way, problems created by the application of thresholds in party-list PR systems.

== Background ==
Under party-list proportional representation with a threshold, the fraction of wasted votes due to the electoral threshold can reach up to 30% and represents a democratic deficit as measured by disproportionality. Despite this, a spare vote is not a feature in any list PR system in use as of this date. The German Federal Constitutional Court ruled that the electoral system is not required to have such a supplementary contingent vote feature.

The term "spare vote" not only refers to the additional specification of a second preference but can also mean the electoral system working with a second preference as a whole. Not every second preference is a spare vote. Ranked voting systems differ in terms of their field of application, choice of party lists vs. choice of individuals. In particular, the following ranking procedures should be strictly distinguished from the spare vote:

- Single transferable vote (and its single winner version instant-runoff voting also called the alternative vote), contingent vote, and supplementary vote: In contrast to the spare vote, which ranks political parties, these systems rank individual candidates.
  - Group voting ticket, a straight-ticket method of single transferable vote for selecting all candidates of a party in a multi-winner district, but in which preferences are automatically distributed to individual candidates rather than the whole party's list. This has been used most under laws which require voters to rank all candidates for all available seats.

The electoral threshold typical in party-list proportional representation and mixed-member proportional representation causes tactical voting and spoiler effects. Voters instead of casting their vote for a preferred party that presumably will fail to pass the electoral threshold tend to choose a less preferred party with a reliable chance of passing the electoral threshold. The security of the spare vote is intended to encourage voters to vote more honestly for their actually preferred party. On the ballot paper, the voter is given the opportunity to designate beside the first preference the spare vote, which becomes an effective vote only under the condition that the first preference fails to comply with the electoral threshold. To prevent that the spare vote falls below the electoral threshold as well, the voter should assign the spare vote to a party that is very likely to pass the electoral threshold. The spare vote continues to prevent the fragmentation of parliaments achieved by the electoral threshold.

== Variants ==
There are different methods for evaluating the spare votes:

- One-step procedure: All votes for parties that are below the electoral threshold according to the first preferences are discarded; in their place, the spare votes for these voters are counted. This is party list version of the contingent vote (if the voters may rank all parties) or supplementary vote (in case of just one spare vote).
- Multi-round procedure: First the party with the lowest number of first preferences is eliminated, and the spare votes from its voters become effective. This is repeated until only parties that are above the electoral threshold are left. The benefit compared the one-step procedure is that some political parties could pass the electoral threshold only once spare votes become effective. This is the party list equivalent of the single transferable vote with the quota being the electoral threshold.

Limiting the ranking of parties to two ranks allows a faster ballot counting procedure, where every electoral district reports only the counts of each party-pair. This procedure does not require all electoral districts to wait until the determination which parties have crossed the electoral threshold is finalized. With more than two ranks of parties, the voters rank several spare votes/parties according to their preferences. In this process, a voter's party vote is carried over until it either goes to a party that is above the electoral threshold or has passed through all of the voter's stated preferences.

The spare vote can also be used in the proportional part of mixed electoral systems with electoral thresholds, and some mixed systems operate on the basis of an indirect spare party vote (mixed single vote) to reuse the candidates that did not receive a direct mandate in favour of the party list they are affiliated with. The second vote under mixed-member proportional systems may be considered a direct Spare vote for a party, but not relating to the electoral threshold, but for the case when a voters favourite local candidate does not win in their district. This is also the case for the party list preference in the mixed ballot transferable vote (MBTV), which is may also use a ranked ballot capable of functioning a contingent party vote if combined with an electoral threshold. It is also the mixed equivalent of the spare vote (and STV, the non-partisan equivalent of the spare vote), meaning the spare vote is used in a two-tier election, and the spare vote is used on the upper (party-list) tier only if it would be wasted on the lower (candidate-based) tier. The process is the same as under the positive vote transfer mechanism of the mixed single vote (MSV), except under MSV, voters do not get to choose their party preference, it is defined by the candidate vote.

The modified d'Hondt electoral system is another preferential party system, which allows to rank parties. It is a variant of single transferable voting, where an electoral threshold for parties is applied.

== Proposals ==
=== Germany ===
In Germany, there were draft laws for the spare vote system 2013 in Schleswig-Holstein, 2015 in Saarland, and Brandenburg, but they were not implemented.

=== New Zealand ===
The spare vote was first mentioned in NZ Academia in 2003 when a German student Claudia Winkler wrote a paper about the German electoral system.

There was a formal governmental electoral review in 2012 where changes equivalent to the spare vote were proposed by three submitters, all seemingly developed independently. The spare vote was not mentioned in the final report.

Another review in 2023 received submissions about the spare vote with positive comments about the proposal in the final report.
