= Mixed single vote =

Voting method in mixed-member systems

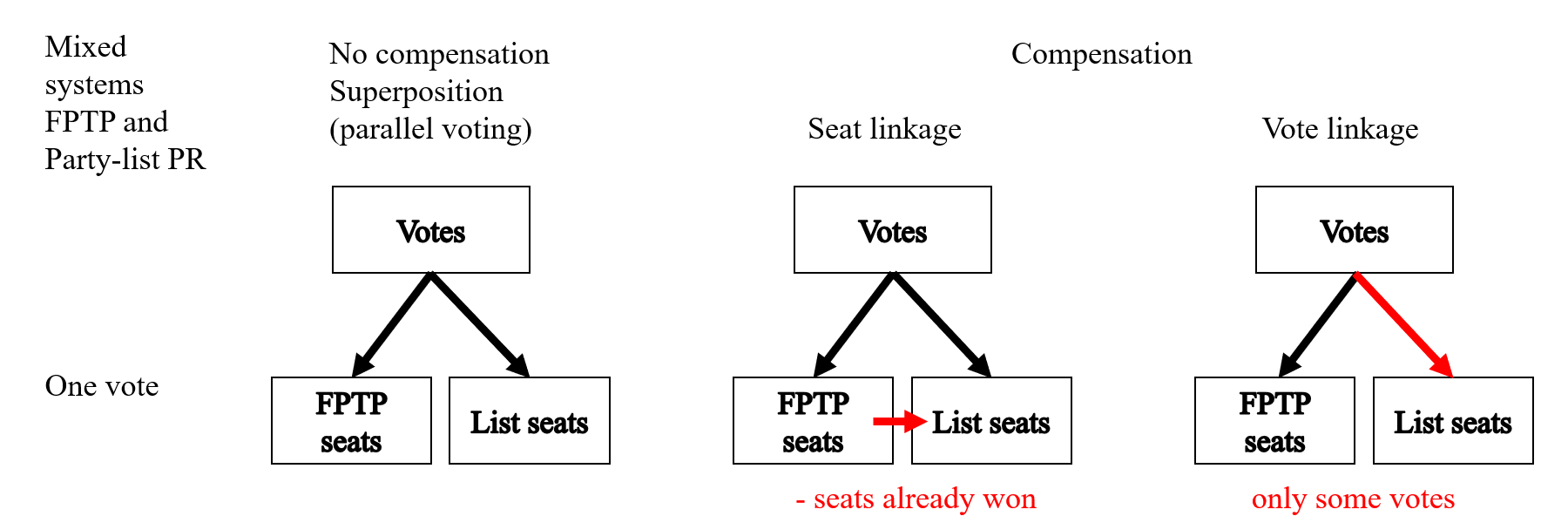
Diagram of three types of mixed single vote systems combining FPTP and party-list PR.

A mixed single vote (MSV) is a type of ballot in mixed-member electoral systems, where voters cast a single vote in an election, which is used both for electing a local candidate and as a vote for a party affiliated with that candidate according to the rules of the electoral system. Unlike most mixed proportional and mixed majoritarian systems (such as parallel voting) where voters cast two votes, split-ticket voting is not possible under MSV. This significantly reduces the possibility of manipulating compensatory mixed systems, at the price of reducing voter choice. An alternative based on the mixed single vote that still allows for indicating different preferences on different levels is the mixed ballot, which functions as a preferential (mixed) single vote.

With MSV, voters usually cast their single vote for a local candidate in a single-member district (SMD) and then all votes (or just the wasted votes, depending on the system) from this lower tier are added to distribute seats between upper tier candidates, typically national party lists. How proportional the outcome is depends on many factors including the vote transfer rules (which votes are recounted as party list votes), whether there is a seat linkage, and other parameters (e.g. the number of list seats) used in the system. MSV systems originate from Germany and variations are currently used in Bolivia, Lesotho and Hungary for local elections in larger municipalities.

MSV is distinct from a very similar balloting system of open list proportional representation where voters only vote for candidates (and this vote is then used as a party vote as well), as open list PR is generally not considered a mixed electoral system, therefore the term mixed single vote is not used for this type of system.

== Electoral systems using mixed single vote ==
The mixed single vote has its origin in West Germany, where two different types of compensatory systems were developed at about the same time:

- The vote linkage compensation method, where not all, but only "wasted" votes get transferred as list votes to the other tier. Some uncommon, supermixed systems use of MSV may add or subtract the discounted list results to establish a vote linkage based element of compensation into system that would otherwise be categorised as parallel voting. (This article focuses primarily on pure implementations of MSV.)
- The seat linkage compensation, where means almost all votes (except for votes independent candidates and for candidates affiliated with parties below a threshold) are transferred to the proportional tier, but ultimately used in a top-up process, like the additional member system (AMS). This was the first type of mixed-member proportional (MMP) electoral system, used in Germany.

The third type of mixed single vote system is the single vote equivalent of parallel voting (sometimes called 'direct vote transfer'), which uses the same vote on both the majoritarian and proportional tiers. This makes such systems non-compensatory, falling under the superposition type of mixed systems identified by Massicotte & Blais.

Compensatory mixed systems
	single vote systems (mixed single vote)	dual vote systems
Seat linkage	top-up MSV: single vote (Lesotho); 50-point proportional representation	mixed-member proportional representation (MMP)
Seat linkage	top-up MSV: single vote (Lesotho); 50-point proportional representation	additional member system (AMS)
Seat linkage	top-up MSV: single vote (Lesotho); 50-point proportional representation	alternative vote plus (AV+)
Seat linkage	top-up MSV: single vote (Lesotho); 50-point proportional representation	Hybrids: e.g. parallel voting+AMS (South Korea)
Vote linkage	positive vote transfer (PVT): Hungarian PVT (local elections)	Hybrids: Parallel voting+PVT (Hungary); negative vote transfer/scorporo (Italy, 1993–2005)
Vote linkage	positive vote transfer (PVT): Hungarian PVT (local elections)	mixed ballot transferable vote (MBTV)
Vote linkage and seat linkage	dual-member proportional (DMP)	Schulze MMP
Non-compensatory mixed systems
	single vote systems	dual vote systems
No linkage	mixed single vote, unlinked versions (MSV): single vote parallel voting (Tanzania, Seychelles)	parallel voting
Vote linkage	mixed single vote, superposition: Italian variant (Rosatellum)	-

== Advantages and disadvantages ==
Mixed single vote systems do not suffer from the ticket-splitting manipulation problem as conventional dual vote compensatory systems do. However, they also deny voters the possibility to express sincere different preferences on individual (local) candidates and party-list.

Seat linkage MSV systems, by default are not immune to decoy list strategies, but this strategic nomination is significantly less effective than in dual vote systems. The positive vote transfer system (vote linkage MSV) is not vulnerable to decoy lists, but is also almost always less proportional. If the number of compensatory seats is (extraordinarily) high, vote linkage systems might incentivize parties to lose local elections - but this was almost impossible in any vote transfer system implemented so far, which have relatively few compensatory seats. A certain type of (positive) vote transfer system may be vulnerable to the "stronghold split strategy", which aims to capture "surplus votes" like a system with winner compensation but this tactic has not been empirically documented.

== Use ==
=== Compensatory systems ===
==== Proportional systems ====
Mixed single vote systems can be used also with a seat linkage method to achieve effectively list PR with local representation (via plurality or majority). Such systems are fundamentally mixed-member proportional systems without the option of split ticket voting. This is the original version of MMP, where all votes, except for those in favour of independent candidates or parties below the entry threshold are transferred and used for the compensation mechanism. Germany, where the 1949 elections were held under a mixed single vote system that used plurality rule on the lower tier and was overall proportional on the regional (state) tier. The country subsequently changed the system to two-vote MMP.

Countries that currently use such systems are:

- Lesotho switched to a mixed single vote version of MMP in 2002.

Countries which previously used such systems:

- Thailand used the mixed single vote version of MMP for the 2019 general election, but reverted to its previous system of parallel voting for the 2023 general election.
- In Romania, the 2008 national legislative elections were held under a mixed single vote system where SMD seats were only awarded to individual winners with an absolute majority.

==== Semi-proportional systems ====
Hungary: Local elections in municipalities and districts in the capital with a population over 10 000 use a mixed single vote with positive vote transfer, where only votes for losing candidates are transferred to the compensatory tier. The vote transfer takes place based on the party affiliation of the local candidates and seats are allocated proportionally based on the transferred votes.

- Up to 25 000 residents 8 members are elected in SMDs and 3 members on the compensatory tier
- Up to 50 000 residents 10 members are elected in SMDs and 4 members on the compensatory tier
- Up to 75 000 residents 12 members are elected in SMDs and 5 members on the compensatory tier
- Up to 100 000 residents 14 members are elected in SMDs and 6 members on the compensatory tier
- Over 100 000 residents, the number of SMDs increases by 1 after every additional 10 000 residents, while the number of compensatory seats increases by 1 after every additional 25 000 residents.

Since the 2014 elections, General Assembly of Budapest also uses a mixed single vote, in that the 23 directly elected mayors of the districts and there are 9 members elected from compensation-lists of parties based on the votes cast for the mayoral candidates. (Budapest mayor candidates and district mayor candidates can be listed on compensation-lists)

Because of the comparatively few compensatory seats, the system does not guarantee proportional results and commonly underrepresents smaller parties, however theoretically, it could also underrepresent larger parties compared to a list PR system.

National Assembly elections use a different positive vote transfer system, which also partially compensates winning candidates, however, that system is not a pure mixed single vote system as it also has a parallel voting component.

== See also ==
- Additional member system
- Scorporo or negative vote transfer systems
- Semi-proportional representation
- Double simultaneous vote (DSV), is a related system, in which a single vote is used for multiple separate elections at the same time (for an assembly and a president), not a single, mixed election
- List of electoral systems by country
