= Party-list system =

Type of electoral system

A party-list system is a type of electoral system that formally involves political parties in the electoral process, usually to facilitate multi-winner elections. In party-list systems, parties put forward a list of candidates, the party-list who stand for election on one ticket. Voters can usually vote directly for the party-list, but in other systems voters may vote directly for individual candidates within or across party lists (such systems are referred to as open list and panachage), instead of voting directly for parties (mixed electoral systems).

Most commonly, party-list systems refer to party-list proportional representation, but there are other electoral systems using party-lists including the general ticket (party block voting) and mixed electoral systems. Not only are not all party-list systems proportional, not all proportional systems are party-list systems. Candidates who won their seats from a party-list are called list MPs.

== Types party-list systems ==
=== By proportionality of representation ===
- proportional party-list systems, including list PR and MMP
- semi-proportional party-list systems, including parallel voting and AMS
- plurality/majoritarian party-list system (general ticket)

=== By candidate selection ===
- Open-list
- Closed-list
- Local list
- Two-tier party-list systems
- Ley de Lemas

=== By ballot type ===
- single vote
- mixed ballot
- panachage
- double simultaneous vote

=== Other ===
- mixed electoral systems that use party-list PR to allocate some, but not all seats

== See also ==
- Election
- List of electoral systems by country
- Comparison of electoral systems
- Outline of democracy
- Multi-member district
- Single transferable vote
- Party-list proportional representation
- Straight-ticket voting
- Group voting ticket
