= Compensation (electoral systems) =

Correction method used in some voting systems

Compensation or correction is an optional mechanism of electoral systems, which corrects the results of one part of the system based on some criterion to achieve a certain result, usually to make it more proportional. There are in general two forms of compensation: vote linkage and seat linkage.

Vote linkage compensation in a single-tier system occurs in many ranked voting systems such as instant-runoff voting and single transferable voting, where votes for eliminated candidates (and in the case of STV, surplus votes of elected candidates) are transferred to other candidates, thereby compensating voters who voted for candidates who may not be elected (or whose votes were not needed to get a candidate elected). This is an example of The equivalent of this type of compensation in case of party-list proportional representation is the spare vote.

Most mixed compensatory electoral systems use seat linkage (typically mixed-member proportional representation). Some use multi-tier vote linkage, which usually leads to results that are less proportional. In mixed electoral systems compensation is usually contrasted with superposition, which means two electoral systems are used independently of each other with multiple tiers.

== Mechanism ==
Compensation commonly occurs either through seat linkage compensation (or top-up) or through vote linkage compensation (or vote transfer). Like a non-compensatory mixed system, a compensatory mixed system may be based on the mixed single vote (voters vote for a local candidate and that vote is used to set the party share of the popular vote for the party that the candidate belongs to) or it may be based on voters casting two separate votes.

=== Example of seat linkage compensation ===
In both mixed compensatory systems and mixed non-compensatory systems, two sets of seats are allocated using different methods. Most often, this involves one winner-take-all system, usually first-preference plurality. The remaining seats are allocated to political parties partially or wholly based on a proportional allocation method such as highest averages or largest remainder. The difference is whether or not the results of the district elections are considered when allocating the PR seats.

In mixed non-compensatory systems, such as parallel voting, the proportional allocation is performed independently of the district election component.

In seat linkage mixed compensatory systems, the allocation of the top-up seats is done in such a way as to compensate as much as possible for dis-proportionality produced by the district elections. MMP generally produces proportional election outcomes, meaning that a political party that wins n percent of the vote will receive roughly n percent of the seats.

The following hypothetical example based on the one by Massicotte illustrates how "top-up" PR seats are typically allocated in a compensatory system and in a non-compensatory system. The example assumes a 200-seat legislative assembly where 100 seats are filled using FPTP and the other 100 seats are awarded to parties using a form of PR. The table below gives the popular vote and FPTP results. The number of PR seats allocated to each party depends on whether the system is compensatory or non-compensatory.

| Party | Popular vote | FPTP seats | PR seats | Total seats (FPTP + PR) | FPTP seats |
|---|---|---|---|---|---|
| Party A | 44% | 64 | ? | ? | |
| Party B | 40% | 33 | ? | ? | |
| Party C | 10% | 0 | ? | ? | |
| Party D | 6% | 3 | ? | ? | |
| TOTAL | 100% | 100 | 100 | 200 | |

In non compensatory system, each party wins its proportional share of the 100 PR seats. Under such a system, the total number of seats (FPTP + PR) received by each party would not be proportional to its share of the popular vote. Party A receives just slightly more of the popular vote than Party B, but receives significantly more seats. In addition to its success in the district contests, Party A receives slightly more of the PR seats than Party B.

| Party | Popular vote | FPTP seats | PR seats (non-compensatory) | Total seats (FPTP + PR) | PR seats (non-compensatory) | Total seats (FPTP + PR) |
|---|---|---|---|---|---|---|
| Party A | 44% | 64 | 44 | 108 (54% of assembly) | | |
| Party B | 40% | 33 | 40 | 73 (36.5% of assembly) | | |
| Party C | 10% | 0 | 10 | 10 (5% of assembly) | | |
| Party D | 6% | 3 | 6 | 9 (4.5% of assembly) | | |
| TOTAL | 100% | 100 | 100 | 200 | | |

If the PR seats are allocated in a compensatory system, the total number of seats awarded to each party is proportional to the party's share of the popular vote. Party B wins 33 of the district seats and its proportional share of the 200 seats being filled is 80 seats (40 percent of the total 200 seats) (the same as its share of the popular vote) so it is awarded 47 of the PR seats.

| Party | Popular vote | FPTP seats | PR seats (compensatory) | Total seats (FPTP + PR) | PR seats (compensatory) | Total seats (FPTP + PR) |
|---|---|---|---|---|---|---|
| Party A | 44% | 64 | 24 | 88 (44% of assembly) | | |
| Party B | 40% | 33 | 47 | 80 (40% of assembly) | | |
| Party C | 10% | 0 | 20 | 20 (10% of assembly) | | |
| Party D | 6% | 3 | 9 | 12 (6% of assembly) | | |
| TOTAL | 100% | 100 | 100 | 200 | | |

In practice, compensatory seat allocation is complicated by the possibility that one or more parties wins so many of the district seats ("overhang") that the available number of PR seats is insufficient to produce a fully proportional outcome. Some mixed compensatory systems have rules that address these situations by adding additional PR seats to achieve overall PR. These seats are used only until the next election, unless needed again at that time.

In MMP, the voter casts two votes: one for a constituency representative and one for a party. In the original variant used in Germany, citizens gave only one vote, so that voting for a representative automatically meant also voting for the representative's party, which is still used in some MMP elections today and is more robust against tactical voting than typical two-vote versions. Most of Germany changed to the two-vote variant to make local members of parliament (MPs) more personally accountable. Voters can thus vote for the local person they prefer for local MP without regard for party affiliation, since the partisan make-up of the legislature is determined only by the party vote. In the 2017 New Zealand election, 27.33% of voters split their vote (voted for a local candidate of a different party than their party vote) compared to 31.64% in 2014.

The Scandinavian countries have a long history of using both multi-member districts (members elected through party-list PR) and nationally based compensatory top-up seats using the same method as MMP, however because the local MPs are also elected using PR, these systems are not usually considered MMP as they are not mixed systems.

=== Dealing with overhang seats ===
When a party wins more constituency seats than it would be entitled to from its proportion of (party list) votes, most systems allow for these overhang seats to be kept by those candidates who earned it in the constituency elections. A counter-example would be the MMP variant used in Romania in the 2008 and 2012 legislative elections, where constituency seats could only be earned by the winning candidate if they also achieved an absolute majority in their district, thereby eliminating overhang seats.

In Germany's Bundestag and the New Zealand House of Representatives, all members elected for constituencies keep their seats. For example, in the 2008 New Zealand general election the Māori Party won 2.4% of the party vote, which would entitle them to 3 seats in the House, but won 5 constituency seats, leaving an overhang of 2 seats, which resulted in a 122-member house. If the party vote for the Māori Party had been more in proportion with the constituency seats won, there would have been a normal 120-member house.

In most German states, and in the federal Bundestag since 2013, the other parties receive extra seats (leveling seats) to create full proportionality. For example, the provincial parliament (Landtag) of North Rhine Westphalia has, instead of the usual 50% compensatory seats, only 29% unless more are needed to balance overhangs. If a party wins more local seats than its proportion of the total vote justifies, the size of the Landtag increases so that the total outcome is fully proportional to the votes, with other parties receiving additional list seats to achieve proportionality. The leveling seats are added to the normal number of seats for the duration of the electoral period. In the German state of Bavaria, the constituency vote and party vote are combined to determine the distribution of seats.

Scotland and Wales use a modified variant of MMP known as the additional-member system where due to the nature of the calculations used to distribute the regional list seats, overhang seats are not possible; the list allocation works like a mixed-member majoritarian system, but in using the d'Hondt method's divisors to find the averages for the allocation, the first divisor for each party takes into account the number of constituency seats won by the party; i.e. a party that won 7 constituency seats would start with a divisor of 8 (7 seats + 1 per the method's divisor formula) instead of 1. The resulting table would then give 7 seats for Scotland and 4 seats for Wales to the parties possessing the highest averages on the table, although both devolved parliaments do not use a table, instead using a sequential method. The compensatory effect characteristic of MMP is in the fact that a party that won constituency seats would have lower averages on the table than it would if the election used MMM. Because of no provision for overhang seats, there have been cases where a party ended up with fewer total seats than its proportional entitlement. This occurred, for example, in the elections in the South East Wales electoral region in both 2007 (Welsh Conservatives under-represented) and in 2016 (Welsh Labour over-represented, Plaid Cymru under-represented). Labour has also been over-represented on this basis in every election in the South Wales West region, and every election in the South Wales Central region apart from the 2003 election. This situation arises because Labour has continued to hold the overwhelming majority of constituency seats in these regions, and only around one-third of the total number of seats are available for distribution as additional regional seats.

| | | Parallel voting (MMM) | | Broadly mixed-member proportional type of system (MMP) | | | | | |
| | | Parallel voting (MMM) | | Additional member system (AMS) | | Overhang seats re-added | | True MMP (with leveling seats) | |
| Party | Popular vote (%) | Seats | Share (%) | Seats | Share (%) | Seats | Share (%) | Seats | Share (%) |
|---|---|---|---|---|---|---|---|---|---|
| Party A | 43% | 67 (54+13) | 67% | 54 (54+0) | 54% | 54 (54+0+0) | 48% | 71 (54+0+17) | 43% |
| Party B | 41% | 24 (11+13) | 24% | 34 (11+23) | 34% | 41 (11+23+7) | 36% | 68 (11+23+34) | 41% |
| Party C | 13% | 3 (0+3) | 3% | 7 (0+7) | 7% | 13 (0+7+6) | 12% | 21 (0+7+14) | 13% |
| Party D | 3% | 5 (5+0) | 5% | 5 (5+0) | 5% | 5 (5+0+0) | 4% | 5 (5+0+0) | 3% |
| TOTAL | 100% | 70+30 | 100% | 70+30 | 100% | 70+30+13 | 100% | 70+30+65 | 100% |
| Index of disproportionality (Gallagher) | | 22.01 (disproportional) | | 10.25 (moderately disproportional) | | 4.97 (considered proportional) | | 0.25 (highly proportional) | |
| Method used | | Independent PR tier | | Fixed number of compensatory seats | | Number of (extra) leveling seats = number of overhang seats | | As many leveling seats as needed | |
| This type of system used in | | Russia, among others | | Scotland, among others | | New Zealand | | formerly in Germany | |

== Tactical manipulation ==
Some compensatory electoral systems have properties that make them vulnerable to manipulation, which is usually intended to subvert the compensation mechanism.

== Compensatory mixed electoral systems ==
Compensatory mixed systems
| | single vote systems | dual vote systems |
|---|---|---|
| Seat linkage | mixed single vote, top-up versions (MSV): single vote MMP; single vote AMS (Bolivia, Lesotho); 50-point proportional representation (proportional-first-past-the-post) | mixed-member proportional representation (MMP) |
| Seat linkage | mixed single vote, top-up versions (MSV): single vote MMP; single vote AMS (Bolivia, Lesotho); 50-point proportional representation (proportional-first-past-the-post) | additional member system (AMS) |
| Seat linkage | mixed single vote, top-up versions (MSV): single vote MMP; single vote AMS (Bolivia, Lesotho); 50-point proportional representation (proportional-first-past-the-post) | alternative vote plus (AV+) |
| Seat linkage | mixed single vote, top-up versions (MSV): single vote MMP; single vote AMS (Bolivia, Lesotho); 50-point proportional representation (proportional-first-past-the-post) | Hybrids: e.g. parallel voting+AMS (South Korea) |
| Vote linkage | positive vote transfer (PVT/MSV): Hungarian PVT/MSV (local elections); Romanian PVT/MSV system (2008–2012) | Hybrids: Parallel voting+PVT (Hungary); negative vote transfer/scorporo (Italy, 1993–2005) |
| Vote linkage | Others systems: | |
| Vote linkage | dual-member proportional (DMP) | mixed ballot transferable vote (MBTV) |

=== Mixed-member proportional (MMP) and additional member systems (AMS) ===
MMP and AMS have a tier of district representatives typically elected by FPTP, and a tier of regional or at-large representatives elected by PR. Unlike in parallel voting, the PR seats are allocated in a manner that corrects disproportionality caused by the district tier. MMP corrects disproportionalities by adding even more leveling seats, this system is used by New Zealand.

The type of MMP which does not always yield proportional results, but sometimes only "mixed semi-proportional representation" is called an additional member system. If the fixed number of compensatory seats are enough to compensate the results of the majoritarian FPTP/SMP side of the election, AMS is equivalent to MMP, but if not, AMS does not compensate for remaining overhang seats. In Bolivia and Lesotho, where single vote versions of AMS are used with a relatively large number of compensatory seats, results are usually proportional. AMS models used in parts of the UK (Scotland and Wales), with small regions with a fixed number of seats tend to produce only moderately proportional election outcomes.

=== Majority jackpot systems ===
While the (very similar) majority bonus systems are considered non-compensatory, majority jackpot systems technically assign the seats outside the jackpot without including the party that received the jackpot, therefore are compensatory in that sense. Some systems, like the one in Armenia, also includes a minority jackpot.

=== Scorporo and negative vote transfer (NVT) ===
Scorporo is a two-tier mixed system similar to MMP in that voters have two votes (one for a local candidate on the lower tier, and one for a party list on the upper tier), except that disproportionality caused by the single-member district tier is partially addressed through a vote transfer mechanism. Votes that are crucial to the election of district-winning candidates are excluded from the PR seat allocation, for this reason the method used by scorporo is referred to as a negative vote transfer system. The system was used in Italy from 1993 to 2005, and a modified version is currently used in Hungary.

=== Mixed ballot transferable vote (MBTV) ===
MBTV is a mixed compensatory type of systems similar to MSV, except voters can vote separately for a local candidate and as a transfer vote on the compensatory tier. It is different from MMP/AMS and AV+ in that there is a vote linkage (instead of seat linkage) between the tiers. The two parts of the dual ballot are tied in a way that only those lists votes get counted, which are on ballots that would be transfer votes in an equivalent positive vote transfer MSV system.

=== Alternative vote plus (AV+) ===
AV+ is a mixed compensatory system similar to the additional member system, with the notable difference that the district seats are awarded using the alternative vote. The system was proposed by the Jenkins Commission as a possible alternative to FPTP for elections to the Parliament of the United Kingdom.

=== Dual member proportional (DMP) ===
DMP is a mixed compensatory system similar to MMP, except that the plurality and PR seats are paired and dedicated to dual-member (two seat) districts. Proposed as an alternative to FPTP for Canadian elections, DMP appeared as an option on a 2016 plebiscite in Prince Edward Island and a 2018 referendum in British Columbia.

=== 50-point proportional representation ===
Main article: 50-point proportional representation

In most list-PR and mixed-electoral systems, a largest remainder or highest average method or formula is used to achieve proportionality. A third, percentage-point method can be used in mixed systems as a compensation mechanism. In this method, leftover and surplus percentage points are transferred to one or more compensatory tiers to achieve a proportional result.

== Countries using compensatory systems ==
=== Current use ===
| Country | Legislative body | Use | Number of votes (personal and list) | Notes |
|---|---|---|---|---|
| Armenia | | | | |
| (Bolivia) Bolivia | Chamber of Deputies | 1994–present | Two votes | |
| (Germany) Germany | State parliaments, except: (Bremen (state)) Bremen, (Hamburg) Hamburg; (Saarland) Saarland | varies by state | varies by state | Bavaria uniquely uses an open-list system for its party-list seats. |
| Hungary | | | | |
| Republic of Korea (South Korea) | National Assembly | 2019–present | Two votes | Originally used a hybrid system with 253 single-member constituency seats, 17 supplementary seats (a la parallel voting) and 30 compensatory seats elected using the additional-member system variant of MMP. Now uses a straightforward AMS system with all proportional seats being compensatory since 2024. |
| Lesotho | National Assembly | 2002–present | Single vote (MSV) | Initially used two vote version, changed to the single vote version in 2012 due to the use of decoy lists. |
| Mexico | | | | |
| Portugal | Azores - Legislative Assembly | 2006–present | Single vote | Prior to 2006, the Azorean electoral system was considered extremely disproportional due to malapportionment across its nine island constituencies, where district magnitude varies from 2 to 20 seats. Organic Law 5/2006, passed by the national parliament, introduced a reform to the Azores' electoral law creating a five-seat compensatory constituency to reduce this disproportionality. The five compensatory seats are allocated based on the aggregation of remainder votes from the nine island constituencies at the regional level. The total assembly size was simultaneously fixed at 57 seats (up from 52), including the 5 compensatory seats. The constituency was first used in the 2008 Azorean regional election. |
| New Zealand | House of Representatives | 1994–present | Two votes | |
| (United Kingdom) United Kingdom | (Scotland) Scotland - Scottish Parliament | 1999–present | Two votes | Modified version of MMP referred to as the additional-member system, which in Scotland is divided into regions. |
| (United Kingdom) United Kingdom | Local elections in: (London) London (Assembly) | 2000–present | Two votes | |
