= Mixed ballot transferable vote =

Method of voting

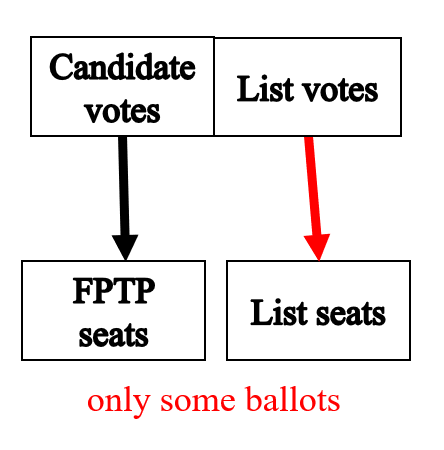
MBTV uses a mixed ballot, on which candidate and list votes can be indicated separately, but are jointly treated as mixed single vote in the vote linkage compensation.

The mixed ballot transferable vote (MBTV) refers to a type of vote linkage-based mixed-member electoral system where a group of members are elected on local (lower) tier, for example in single-member districts (SMDs). Other members are elected on a compensatory national (upper) tier from a list and voters cast a single ballot where they may indicate their preferences separately.

A dual vote mixed system is not necessarily a mixed ballot system, particularly the ones using separate ballots for the two votes. This article is primarily about systems using mixed ballots. For the dual vote, hybrid versions of parallel voting and MSV used in Hungary and formerly used in Italy for national elections, see scorporo.

== Overview ==
Unused votes from the lower tier are counted on the upper tier in a compensatory way using a (partial, positive) vote transfer mechanism. This tied, preferential nature of the dual ballot makes it different from mixed-member proportional (seat linkage compensatory) and parallel voting (non-compensatory) systems, which also use two votes for the two tiers. How proportional the outcome is depends on among other factors, the rules (what counts as "wasted" vote) and parameters (e.g. the number of compensatory seats) used in the system.

In Hungary, elections to the National Assembly use a dual vote based positive vote transfer system, where votes for candidates that did not win a seat are added along with excess votes for the winner in the seat to the list votes. This has plurality SMDs and also partially compensates winning candidates, however, that system uses a parallel voting component to count list votes (which are located on separate ballots).

A system formerly used in Italy, scorporo is also a dual vote and vote linkage based mixed electoral system, but differs from MBTV in that it uses negative vote transfer as its compensatory mechanism. These systems lack the "transferable" (preferential) part of MBTV, in favour of an automatic vote transfer based on party affiliation.

Compensatory mixed systems
	single vote systems	dual vote systems
Seat linkage	mixed single vote, top-up versions (MSV): single vote (Lesotho)	Two vote "top-up" - broadly mixed-member proportional representation (MMP): additional member system (AMS); alternative vote plus (AV+)
Seat linkage	mixed single vote, top-up versions (MSV): single vote (Lesotho)	Hybrids: e.g. parallel voting+seat linkage compensation (South Korea)
Seat linkage	dual-member mixed proportional (DMP)	Hybrids: e.g. parallel voting+seat linkage compensation (South Korea)
Vote linkage	positive vote transfer: Hungary (local elections)	Hybrids (parallel voting+vote linkage): parallel voting+positive vote transfer (Hungary); parallel voting+ negative vote transfer (scorporo) (Italy, 1993–2005)
Vote linkage	Others systems:	
Vote linkage	mixed ballot transferable vote (MBTV) - preferential mixed single vote	

== Variations ==
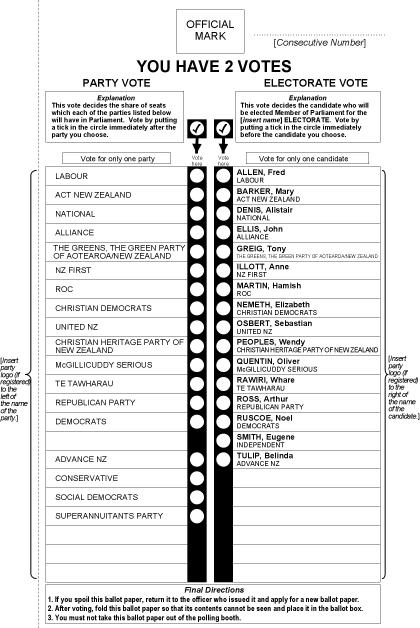
A mixed ballot in New Zealand, used for MMP

=== Plurality ===
The simplest type of MBTV system allows two single choices on the ballot: one for a local candidate, one for a party list. This type of ballot is also used in the electoral system of Germany and New Zealand.

=== Ranking ===
A ballot can allow either the voter to rank the candidates or the party lists or both, in this case rankings can be used for a system of elimination, like that of instant-runoff voting (to determine local winners and which parties pass the entry threshold). If ranking of both is allowed, the ballot design can also allow to intermix the rankings, providing a full ranking.

The ranked ballots can also be used for elections by STV on the local tier, an example is a proposal by Schulz, where not only can voters rank parties intermixed with candidates on a local level, but another party vote can be cast for the MMP-type of compensation (seat linkage). The system utilizes the mixed ballot by providing that if a party has received overhang seats, then only a certain share of those ballots which have contributed to the election candidates of that party will be considered when counting the party votes. The rest of those ballots are considered to have been cast for the party of those candidates who got elected, which avoids split ticket voters double voting power.

=== Other ===
MBTV systems may be designed around other systems, for example approval and proportional approval voting.

== Usage of mixed ballots ==
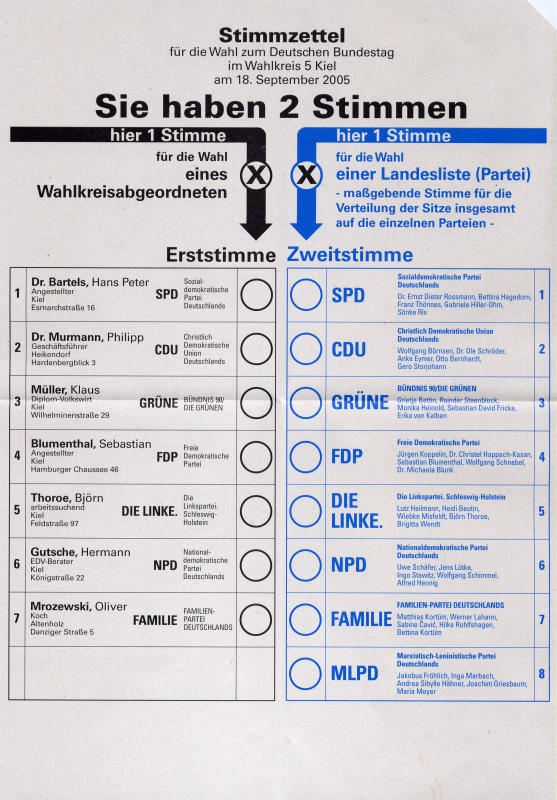
A mixed ballot used in the 2005 elections to the German Bundestag

The German electoral system, which, while it falls under the category of MMP systems due to its seat linkage mechanism, also uses a mixed ballot on which the first vote (Erststimme) and second vote (Zweitstimme) are both single choice votes. In addition, as in MBTV, not all ballots are used in the compensatory tier, such namely ballots cast for independent candidates who have won a district seat and parties below the electoral threshold. This mechanism makes it similar to the preferential interpretation of the mixed ballot when it would be used in a purely vote linkage based system.

== See also ==
- Mixed single vote
- Mixed-member proportional representation
- Scorporo or negative vote transfer systems
- Instant-runoff voting
- Semi-proportional representation
- List of electoral systems by country
