= Electoral system of Hungary =

The electoral system of Hungary is the set of voting methods and rules used in Hungary, including mainly the system for electing members of the National Assembly (parliamentary elections) and local government elections. The Hungarian electoral system also includes the systems used for the European Parliament elections held in Hungary and the elections of minority local government elections, as well as the rules of referendums and similar initiatives. The president of the republic is not directly elected.

The electoral system of parliamentary elections (a variation on the former Italian scorporo system) and the mixed single vote system used to elect some local governments may be called uniquely Hungarian electoral systems, while other systems used in Hungary are also widely used worldwide.

	National elections		Local government and minority elections			
Election	National Assembly elections (general elections)	European Parliament elections	Local government elections			Minority local government elections
Elected officials	MPs (199)	MEPs elected in Hungary (21)	Mayors (+ Lord Mayor of Budapest)	Members of local councils	Members of county assemblies and members of the Assembly of Budapest	^{Members of minority local governments (5)}
Electoral system(s)	Two-vote positive vote transfer system (mixed-member majoritarian) 106 representatives are elected by relative majority vote in single-mandate constituencies, 93 representatives are elected from a national list (Closed lists, D'Hondt method)	Party-list proportional representation(Zárt, lista, D'Hondt)	First-past-the-post voting	At least population of 10.000: Mixed single vote Below population of 10.000: Plurality block voting	County assemblies and Budapest Assembly: Party-list proportional representation (Closed lists, D'Hondt method)	Plurality block voting
Frequency	Every 4 years (+ by-elections)	Every 5 years	Every 5 years (+ by-elections)			
Suffrage	Hungarian citizens (those without a Hungarian address only have a list vote)	Hungarian citizens and other European Union citizens with a residential address in Hungary, as well as Hungarian citizens without a Hungarian address	Hungarian citizens with a Hungarian address and other European Union citizens, as well as persons recognized as refugees, immigrants or settled			registered minority voters

== Principles ==
According to the Basic Law of Hungary, every citizen is entitled to universal and equal suffrage, and voting is always direct and secret.

The right to vote in Hungary is voluntary and free, voting is not mandatory. Parliamentary and local government elections can be general elections or by-elections (which may be held for non-list elections).

General parliamentary elections must be held every four years and local government elections every five years. The date of the parliamentary election is set by the President of the Republic no later than 72 days before the election.

== National Assembly elections ==
=== General elections ===
Among the members of the National Assembly, 106 representatives are elected in individual constituencies and 93 representatives are elected from a national list.

In the general elections held every 4 years, all members of parliament are reelected. In the election, voters may vote for an individual representative candidate in one of the 106 single-member constituencies, as well as for one party list or minority list in the national constituency.

In the election, citizens with a residential address in Hungary have two votes (individual and list), while Hungarian citizens across the border can only vote for a national list (they do not belong to any individual electoral district). With the vote of the national list, a citizen can vote either for a nationality list or a party list, but not for both - they must declare this before the election (if they wish to vote for a nationality list). The list vote is used in a closed list system, voters do not have the opportunity to influence the order of the candidates on the lists.

==== Constituencies ====
In the 106 individual constituencies, representatives are elected by plurality ("relative majority") voting, i.e. each voter can vote for one candidate and the candidate with the most votes wins (first-past-the-post). Unlike the previous system, the current system has a single round of voting, so the winning candidate does not have to get more than half of the votes (absolute majority).

==== List votes ====
The 93 national list mandates are allocated as follows

- The number of votes representing the electoral threshold is established, which is 5% in the case of party lists (10% in the case of a joint list of two parties, and 15% in the case of three or more parties). Minority lists receive a preferential quota: it is the number of votes for list mandates divided by the number of list mandates (93) times four (1/93×4, approx. 0.27%). Mandates cannot be obtained from party lists and national lists below the threshold.
- Minority list mandates, which can be obtained with a preferential quota, are distributed first.
- The votes cast for the losing candidates in the individual branch and the surplus votes cast for the winning candidate (result of the winning candidate - (result of the losing candidate + 1 vote)) shall be considered fractional votes and will be added (in the case of lists achieving a result above the threshold) to the list votes.
- The remaining list mandates (after the distribution of preferential minority mandates) are distributed among the lists using the D'Hondt method, and the candidates from the lists receive mandates according to their order (if they did not win in an individual branch).

=== Minority speakers ===
Those minorities that submitted a list that did not achieve the number of votes required for the preferential mandate have the opportunity to send a minority nationality advocate to the National Assembly. The Nationality Advocate will be the 1st person on their list.

=== Filling vacant seats, by-elections ===
By-elections must be called in individual constituencies if

- there are no candidates in the election,
- the most votes are obtained by two or more candidates with an equal number of votes,
- the mandate of the elected individual constituency representative is terminated (e.g. death).

In the case of a mandate obtained on a national list, the party or ethnic self-government may nominate someone from the list, otherwise the next representative fills the mandate. If there are no more representatives on the list, the mandate remains vacant. This is also how the position of national advocate will be filled.

=== Criticisms ===
According to critics, the new electoral system essentially makes it impossible for parties with separate lists to nominate common individual candidates, because in this case the fractional votes are lost, and this is an indefensible provision specifically aimed at hindering the unity of the opposition.

Kovács and Stumpf pointed out in their study that the current system shows a greater tendency towards disproportionality. In search of the source of the disproportionality, three internal and one external factor were identified in the model. The internal factors are: 1. the change in the proportions of individual and list mandates, 2. the introduction of "premiumization" for the winner, 3. the termination of the independent compensation list; external factor: the evolution of the power relations of the parties at national and district level. Although Századvég and Nézőpont tried in vain to refute the gerrymandering effect, the data from the 2014 elections showed a significant correlation between the popularity of Fidesz and the number of constituency voters. Thus, the votes of Fidesz were 3-4% stronger due to the inequality of the constituencies alone, and in addition, in terms of distribution, there was an apparently strong disproportion in favor of Fidesz (it represented 96/106 individual mandates) in the party structure at that time.

Another criticism arises that the fractional votes to be included in the national party list are formed from the votes cast for the representative who won the individual mandate. Legislators respond to this by ensuring that there are no wasted votes. However, since these votes were already partially valid in the individual category, and moreover with greater weight, this means further overcompensation of the winners, making the already disproportional system even more disproportional.

=== Legal framework ===
As a significant change to the laws defining election rules, the Basic Law effective from January 1, 2012 prohibited the holding of referendums on the content of election laws. The proponents did not justify the need to introduce the ban.

=== Primary elections ===
In 2021, six Hungarian opposition parties (DK, Jobbik, LMP, MSZP, Momentum, Párbeszéd) held national primaries on the occasion of their joint participation in the 2022 parliamentary elections. Within this framework, the selection of the common individual representative candidates and the common prime minister candidate in the 106 individual constituencies was entrusted to the voters. Citizens who turned 18 by the time of the 2022 parliamentary election could also participate in the vote. The individual representative candidates were elected in one round, and the prime minister candidate was elected in two rounds by plurality voting. A maximum of 3 candidates who achieved a result of at least 15% could advance to the second round. If no candidate obtained more than half of the votes in the first round, the 50% result was no longer necessary in the second round.

The first round of the primary election was held September 18–28, 2021, the second 10–16 October. Gergely Karácsony, who finished second in the first round, withdrew in favor of Péter Márki-Zay, so in the end only 2 candidates participated in the second round. The selection of the candidates on the joint list (with the exception of the Prime Ministerial candidate) was carried out jointly by the parties after the primaries.

== Local government and minority elections ==
=== Local governments ===
==== Mayors ====
Mayors and the mayor of Budapest can be elected everywhere from individual mayoral candidates by voting for one of the candidates. The Mayor is the candidate with the most votes (single round, plurality voting).

==== Councils ====
In settlements with more than 10,000 inhabitants mandates can be obtained in individual constituencies and from compensation lists in the mixed election system.

In the individual constituencies, one representative is elected in a plurality voting system, similar to the rules of the mayoral election, without a participation limit, that is, regardless of the number of participants and the distribution of votes among the candidates, the candidate who received the most votes wins the mandate. In the individual constituency, the election is indecisive only if several candidates obtain an equal number of votes (including the case where no candidate receives a vote), in which case no candidate is elected and a by-election must be held. Holding the election is not an obstacle if only one candidate is running in the constituency.

A compensation list can be submitted by the organization that nominates candidates in more than half of the individual constituencies. During the compensation, the fractional votes cast by each nominating organization for the unelected candidates in the individual constituencies must be taken into account. Only the list of the organization whose candidates received at least 5% of the aggregated compensation votes at the settlement level can receive a compensation mandate. In the case of a joint list, the limit is 10%, and in the case of a joint list of more than two organizations, it is 15%. The distribution of mandates among the compensation lists is prescribed by law according to a modified version of the D'Hont method, which makes it easier for smaller organizations to obtain their first mandate. However, since the number of mandates that can be distributed is very small in most settlements (for example, only 3 up to 25,000 inhabitants), this solution leaves the distribution of mandates highly disproportionate.

In settlements with no more than ten thousand inhabitants, the so-called "individual list" election system (block voting) is used to elect the members of the representative body. This means that, in addition to the names of the candidates, the ballot also shows how many representatives can be elected in the settlement, and the voter can cast his vote for a maximum of this number of representatives. A ballot is valid even if the voter votes for fewer candidates than can be elected. The representative mandates are awarded to the candidates with the most votes, in the event of a tie, a draw will be held. Who did not receive a vote cannot become representative, and if the number of elected representatives is less than the number of people who can be elected, by-elections must be called for vacant seats.

==== County assemblies, Budapest Assembly ====
The members of the Budapest Metropolitan Assembly are the mayors of the 23 districts, the Mayor of Budapest and another 9 mandates are distributed from compensation lists.

The composition of the county assemblies (or the capital assembly before 2014) can be voted on by voting on one of the lists established by parties and social organizations. The lists are allocated seats in the general assembly in proportion to the total votes obtained in the entire county (or in the capital before 2014). Mandates can only be obtained in the general assemblies from those lists for which the votes cast exceed 5% of all valid votes. In the case of a joint list, the limit is 10%, and in the case of a joint list of more than two organizations, it is 15%.

Since 2014, the 33-member capital assembly has been composed of the Lord Mayor (elected directly), 23 district mayors (elected directly) and 9 representatives from the compensation list. Only mayoral candidates and district mayor candidates may appear on the compensation list.

In December 2023, the Hungarian Parliament restored the party list system.

=== Minority local governments ===
In the settlements (and districts of Budapest) where minority elections have been initiated, no more than five candidates of one of the minorities can be elected. The vote is valid even if the voter marks fewer names than possible; representatives will be the candidates with the most votes. A minority local government can be formed by the minority for whose candidates at least one hundred voters cast valid votes in settlements with a population greater than ten thousand, and at least fifty voters in those with a population smaller than this. Minority municipalities of settlements with fewer than 1,300 inhabitants may consist of a maximum of three representatives, and those of more than five may consist of a maximum of five representatives. A minority that can form a self-government in at least one district in the capital can also establish a minority self-government in the capital, and minorities can also form a national minority self-government.

== European Parliament elections ==
The election, as in most EU member states, takes place in Hungary in a party-list proportional election system (in one round), which takes place every 5 years, and only parties can participate. The entire country is one multi-member constituency. The electoral system in Hungary uses closed lists, the electoral threshold is 5%, and the D'Hondt method is used for the proportional distribution of mandates. The number of mandates specified in the legal act of the European Union – 21 according to these rules – is allocated in Hungary.

Citizens of all other EU member states with registered residence in Hungary can vote in the election, if they indicate their intention to do so, in this case they will also vote for Hungarian parties. Hungarian citizens can participate in the EP elections of other countries in a similar way, in which case they vote according to the rules applied in the other EU country.

== Referendums and other initiatives ==
=== National referendums ===
A national referendum can be mandatory or discretionary (facultative referendum). In both cases, the result of the referendum is decisive and binding. The National Assembly - if the referendum gives rise to a legislative obligation - is obliged to create a law corresponding to the decision of the valid and successful referendum within one hundred and eighty days from the day of the vote, which decision is binding on the Parliament for three years from the promulgation of the law. The referendum must be scheduled for a date beyond 50 days after its order, so that it does not fall on the days specified in the law.

At the initiative of at least two hundred thousand voters, the National Assembly orders a national referendum. At the initiative of the President of the Republic, the Government or one hundred thousand voters, the Parliament can order a national referendum.

The decision made in a valid and decisive referendum is binding on the National Assembly. The referendum is valid if at least half of all voters voted validly, and it is decisive if more than half of those who voted validly gave the same answer to the formulated question.

The subject of a national referendum may be an issue within the tasks and powers of the Parliament.

=== Local referendums ===
A local referendum is the direct participation of the population of the village, the city, the capital district, the capital, or the county in the government of local affairs under the jurisdiction of the local government. A local referendum can be initiated by at least a quarter of the members of the local representative body, the committee of the municipality, and also a number of voters specified in the municipal decree (at least 10, maximum 25 percent of the voters).

Similar to the national referendum, the legislation distinguishes between compulsory and optional local referendums; in the latter case, the representative body may reconsider scheduling a local referendum.

=== Recognition of a native ethnic group ===
If a nationality living in Hungary wants to gain recognition, at least a thousand Hungarian citizens who claim to belong to this nationality and have the right to vote in the elections of local government representatives and mayors can initiate the declaration of the nationality as a native ethnic group in Hungary.

During the procedure, the provisions regarding the initiative of the national referendum must be applied, with the exception that the organizer of the initiative can only be a voter with Hungarian citizenship who is eligible to be elected in the election of local government representatives and mayors. In the course of its procedure, the National Election Commission is obliged to request the opinion of the Hungarian Academy of Sciences on the existence of the legal conditions. At the end of the procedure, the Parliament decides on the recognition of a native ethnic group.

=== European citizens' initiative ===
At least one million EU citizens can initiate that the European Commission - within its competence - present a suitable proposal in those cases in which, according to the citizens' opinion, the adoption of an EU legal act is necessary for the implementation of the Treaties.

== Historical electoral systems ==
=== Diet ===
In Hungary, by the end of the 15th century, three orders (nobility, clergy, burghers) were created, and with the disintegration of the noble order, four orders (nobility, common nobility, clergy, burghers) were created by the 16th century, and these orders survived until 1848. The legislature of the State was the Diet (Országgyűlés in Hungarian, meaning Country Assembly), which was convened by the monarch, and they had the right to dissolve it. The Diet did not mean an institution that meets continuously every year. Depending on the political situation, their interests, and the pressure of the orders, the rulers called or did not call a parliament, often there was no parliament for years. In the parliaments of the Hungarian order, among the orders, the nobility played a decisive role, the role of the clergy and especially the bourgeoisie was more complementary.

The Diets held during the 17th-18th century consisted of about 500 people. The parliamentary system was also based on the noble county, the county self-governing institution of the nobility, whose members were elected from the 13th century.

In 1608, the two-chamber system was introduced in the parliament of royal Hungary, separating the upper table (Magnates) and the lower table (Delegates). The members of the upper table (which later became the House of Magnates) were the nobles and high priests, by birth or office. At the meetings of the lower table (which later became the House of Representatives), delegates selected by election represented the other orders.

=== Diet (1608–1848) ===
The election of the delegates of the lower table took place in the elections taking place in the noble counties (the county self-governing institution of the nobility) that emerged from the 13th century. About 10% of the entire population of voting age could vote for the elected delegates of the lower table (5% county nobility, 5% residents of free royal cities). Even within this, the number of representative seats was not proportional: from the county nobility, each county was entitled to one vote, while the representatives of the free royal cities, the clergy, and the districts had only one vote each. Thus, most of the members of the lower table of the Diet were delegates of the county nobility. They were elected in the county elections, by the county nobility at the county hall, after a campaign of courtesies. The candidates were accompanied and assisted by professional courtiers. For the final decision, the crowd of nobles supporting the candidates gathered at the County Hall: most of them listened to the noise from outside, through the open windows, and cheered their candidate from time to time in accordance with the signals of the courtiers standing in the window. The noble crowd that entered the assembly hall engaged in a loud debate, which was accompanied by cheers and shouts led by the courtiers. According to the traditional rule, the final decision on the candidates was made on the basis of the opinion of the majority: there was no vote counting, but the majority was estimated based on the volume of the shouting of the crowd supporting the candidates. The elected county delegate was provided with instructions and could be recalled.

=== Representative parliamentary system (from 1848) ===
Act V of 1848 introduced the individual, single-round, plurality election system, in which Hungarian men who had reached the age of twenty and who met the financial threshold had the right to vote. The age limit for eligibility was 24, and the conditions were Hungarian citizenship and knowledge of the Hungarian language.

In the age of Austria-Hungary, an 1874 law tied the right to vote to taxation, and in 1899 those who did not pay their tax arrears were excluded from those entitled to vote. Act XIV of 1913. ordered non-secret voting (open ballot) and tied the right to vote to a wealth and literacy test.

General and secret suffrage, which also extends to women, was first introduced by the Károlyi government in 1918. All men over 21 and women over 24 who could read and write in any Hungarian language were given the right to vote.

In modern-day Hungary, free, democratic elections were held for the first time in 1920. [source?] According to a 1925 law of the Horthy era, voting was secret, but mandatory, only in Budapest and in cities with legislative authority, for which everyone over the age of 24 and men who completed four years of schooling and women over 30 who completed six years of schooling were eligible. Voting was made secret and compulsory everywhere in 1938, and the system of recommendations (for candidatures) was then introduced.

In 1945, after the Second World War, the Provisional National Assembly adopted the law which established general and equal suffrage and secret and direct voting with party-list proportional system, but at the same time excluded traitors, for example, from the right to vote.

In 1947, hundreds of thousands were disenfranchised based on political considerations. Free elections were finally abolished by the 1949 law, which gave the right of nomination to the National Council of the People's Front and limited the possibility of voting to a single, fixed (closed) list.

In 1953, the law set the voting age at 18 years, abolished the exclusions introduced between 1945 and 1947, and ordered the nomination of representatives by open ballot voting. The right to nominate came into the hands of the Patriotic People's Front in 1966, and the individual district system was also introduced at that time. From 1970, the participants of the nomination assemblies could nominate candidates themselves, then Act III. of 1983 made double nomination mandatory. According to the law, in addition to the two official candidates of the Patriotic People's Front, the participants of the nomination meetings could also propose another person. The candidate was the one who was supported by at least one third of all the participants of the minimum two nomination meetings.

In the 1985 elections, as a result, 32 of the 74 so-called spontaneous candidates entered parliament, including the MSZMP member Zoltán Király, a television editor-reporter, who won a seat in one of Szeged's electoral districts ahead of Mihály Komócsin, the retired first secretary of the county party committee at the time. In Budapest, the democratic opposition also tried to launch Tamás Bauer, Ferenc Langmár, László Rajk Jr. and Gáspár Miklós Tamás, among others, without success.

In 1989, the opposition revived the legal institution of the recall of representatives; the deputies who resigned as a result of this were replaced by opposition candidates in the parliament of the late Kádár era: among others, Gábor Roszík (MDF) in Gödöllő, József Debreceni (MDF) in Kecskemét, Gáspár Miklós Tamás (SZDSZ) in Budapest.

==== National Assembly elections between 1989 and 2011 ====
In the electoral system used from 1990 until the 2010 election, the National Assembly had 386 members, two-round voting was used in the individual constituencies, and seats were distributed at 3 levels (local, regional and national). Voters could only vote directly for individual candidates and regional lists. The election threshold was initially 4%, later raised to 5%.

==== Overview of the franchise (1848–1989) ====
Period	Law	Elections	Percentage of population	Female Suffrage?	Secret?	Age	Economic census	Education census
1848-1874	Article V of 1848	1848, 1861-1872	7.2%	No	No	20	House/Land worth ≥300 000 Ft Manufacturers, artisans with ≥1 assistant ≥100 Ft yearly income	Teachers, scientists, academic artists, doctors, lawyers, pastors, village clerks, regardless of income
1874-1913	Article XXXIII of 1874	1875-1910	6%	No	No	20	Pay income tax for ≥105 Ft yearly income Artisans paying taxes for ≥1 assistant	Teachers, scientists, academic artists, doctors, lawyers, pastors, village clerks, certified foresters and miners, regardless of income
1913-1918	Article XIV of 1913	-	10%	No	Only in large cities	21 (Intelectuals) 30 (others)	Elementary school (6th grade) graduates: Licensed industrialists; Employed as production supervisor; Employed for 3 years; Works as a supporting family member in a voter's farm, industrial business or company; Non-commissioned officers; Paying ≥2 Korona in taxes; Other literates: Licensed industrialists; Employers of ≥1 assistant; Paying ≥ 20 Korona in taxes; Illiterates: Paying ≥40 Korona in taxes	Secondary school graduates, regardless of income
1918	Article XVII of 1918 (Lex Vázsonyi)	-	15%	No	Only in large cities	21	Paying ≥ 10 Korona in taxes; Owning 8 acres of land; Licensed industrialists; Permanently employed in public or private services; Non-commissioned officers; Recipients of Medal for Bravery or Károly Cross	Elementary school (6th grade) graduates
1918-1919	No. I of 1918 people's law	-	50%	Partial	Yes	21 (men) 24 (women)	-	Literacy for women
1919		1919		Yes	Yes	18	Entrepreneurs, traders, unemployed excluded	Clergy excluded
1919-1922	5985. M.E. of 1919 s. decree	1920	40%	Yes	Yes	24	-	Literacy for women
1922-1925	2200 M.E. of 1922 s. decree (Lex Bethlen)	1922	29%	Partial	Only in large cities	24 (men) 30 (women)	Permanent residence for 2 years: Except for: Teachers, pastors, public officials, employed university graduates, members of the National Theater Association	Elementary school graduates: 4th grade for men, women who are self-sufficient or gave birth to ≥3 children (alive or died in war); 6th grade for other women; University graduates regardless of age or gender
1925- 1938	Article XXVI of 1925	1926-1935	29%	Partial	Only in large cities	24 (men) 30 (women)	Permanent residence for 2 years: Except for: Teachers, pastors, public officials, employed university graduates, members of the National Theater Association	Elementary school graduates: 4th grade for men, women who are self-sufficient or gave birth to ≥3 children (alive or died in war); 6th grade for other women; University graduates regardless of age or gender
1938-1945	Article XIX of 1938	1939		Partial (if wife or widow of a voter)	Yes	26 (men) 30 (women)	Permanent residence for 6 years Self-sufficient women Conditional on literacy: Non-commissioned officers; War invalids; Károly Cross recipients; Industrialists; Farmers with income ≥40 Korona; Farmers with land ≥4-10 acres; Employed for the same employer for 4 years	Literate women who gave birth to ≥3 children (alive or died in war) Elementary school (6th grade) graduates Secondary school graduates above 26 regardless of gender University graduates regardless of age or gender
1945-1947	Article VIII of 1945	1945	60%	Yes	Yes	20	-	-
1947-1949	Article XXII of 1947	1947	50%	Yes	Yes	20	-	-
1949-1989	Constitution of 1949	1949-1985		Yes	Yes	18	-	-
1989-	Article XXXIV of 1989	1990-		Yes	Yes	18	-	-

== See also ==
- Electoral systems
- Scorporo
- Electoral threshold
- Plurality voting
- Mixed single vote
- Block voting
- Referendum
- List of Hungarian constituencies

== Further information ==
- Website of the National Office of Elections
- Act CCIII. of 2011 on the election of members of the National Assembly (in Hungarian)
- Act XXXVI. of 2013 on electoral procedure (in Hungarian)
- History of elections (in Hungarian)
