= Elections in Bolivia =

Bolivia elects on national level a head of state – the president – and a legislature. The president and the vice-president are elected for a five-year term by the people. The National Congress (Congreso Nacional) has two chambers. The Chamber of Deputies (Cámara de Diputados) has 130 members, elected for a five-year term using a two vote seat linkage compensatory system (for mixed-member proportional representation) and in the case of seven indigenous seats by usos y costumbres. The Chamber of Senators (Cámara de Senadores) has 36 members: each of the country's nine departments returns four senators allocated proportionally.

Bolivia has a multi-party system, with numerous parties. During the first 23 years of renewed democracy beginning 1982, no one party succeeded in gaining power alone, and parties had to work with each other to form coalition governments. From 2005 to 2025, a single party enjoyed a parliamentary majority but that scenario changed in the 2025 elections.

Ahead of any national election a period of prohibition takes effect. This is with the intention of preventing inebriated nationals voting in error. Nationals are also forbidden from travelling around during the same period. This is to prevent voters from voting in more than one district. On polling day it is difficult to obtain a taxi or bus, due to the limitations placed upon travel and transport.

== Electoral system ==
The president is directly elected by a two-round runoff (ballotage) system. A candidate has to receive at least 50% of the vote, or 40% of the vote, and 10% more than the second candidate to be elected, otherwise a second round is held with the top two finishers to determine the winner.

The 130 members in the Chamber of Deputies (Cámara de Diputados) are elected using a seat linkage based mixed compensatory system using two votes: 63 deputies are elected by first-preference plurality to represent single-member electoral districts, 60 are elected by closed list party-list proportional representation from party lists on a departmental basis (in districts of varying sizes corresponding to Bolivia's nine departments with a threshold of 3%). The list seats in each region are awarded proportionally based on the vote for the presidential candidates, subtracting the number of single-member districts won (to provide mixed-member proportional representation). The remaining seven seats are reserved indigenous seats elected by the usos y costumbres. A voter can only vote in one of either the normal constituencies or special constituencies (coexistence). Party lists are required to alternate between men and women, and in the single-member districts, men are required to run with a female alternate, and vice versa. At least 50% of the deputies from single-member districts are required to be women.

The Chamber of Senators (Cámara de Senadores) has 36 members, four from each the country's nine departments, which are also elected using closed party-lists, using the D'Hondt method. The senate seats are also awarded based on the vote for president.

The election uses the same votes to elect the President (first round), the Chamber and the Senate, making it a double (triple) simultaneous vote. Voters may therefore not split their ticket between these elections, but they may vote for a candidate of a different list in the election of the Chamber as the deputies from the single-member districts are elected using separate votes.

== History of elections in Bolivia ==
=== Indirect elections, 1825–1850 ===
Elections were conducted in the early Republican period using multiple levels of electors, each of which would elect members of the next higher level, culminating in the president.

=== Direct elections with restricted suffrage, 1839 and 1850–1938 ===
In the elections of 1839, however, the president was elected by a majority of all voters. This system became the norm beginning in 1850. Voting requirements included a minimum property or income or service in one of the professions, and forbid all those "in domestic service" from voting. Indigenous peoples were effectively excluded from the franchise.

=== Expanding electorate, 1938–1951 ===
Under the Constitution of 1938, property restrictions on voting were removed however the vote was still restricted to those who were male, literate, and of age. Elections were held in 1940 and 1951, and saw a dramatic expansion of the electorate.

=== Universal suffrage and interruptions in democracy, 1952–1979 ===
Shortly after coming to power through the Bolivian Revolution of 1952, the National Revolutionary Movement instituted universal suffrage, ending literacy requirements and racial restrictions which had massively reduced the Bolivian electorate up to that time. General elections were held in 1956, 1960, and 1964; and purely legislative elections were held in 1958 and 1962. Democracy was interrupted in 1964 by René Barrientos Ortuño, who proceeded to hold and win an election in 1966 and to convoke the Constituent Assembly of 1966-67 to rewrite the Constitution of Bolivia. Following Barrientos' death in 1969, democracy was further interrupted by military rule until 1979, including the eight-year dictatorship of Hugo Bánzer Suarez.

=== Democratic transition and final dictatorship, 1979–1982 ===
In a chaotic period of transition marked by numerous coups d'état, three elections were held in 1978, 1979, 1980. Parliamentary majorities were not obtained in 1978 and 1979 and alliance building was interrupted by coups. Lydia Gueiler, an elected member of the National Congress assumed power constitutionally from November 1979 to mid-1980. The results of the 1980 elections were the basis for the post-1982 parliament and the 1982–85 government of Hernán Siles Zuazo.

=== Multiparty democracy, 1982–present ===
Elections have been held regularly in the democratic period that began in 1982. General elections were held in 1985, 1989, 1993, 1997, 2002, 2005, and 2009. A Constituent Assembly was elected in 2006. The 1985 Organic Law of Municipalities restored local elections for mayor and created a legislative body, the municipal council, in each municipality. The first local elections were held in 1987, followed by further elections in 1989, 1991, 1993, 1995, 1999, 2004, and 2010. Similarly, departmental elections for Prefect began in 2006 and elections for Departmental Legislative Assemblies began in 2010. Following the passage of the 2009 Constitution, the National Electoral Court was replaced in late 2010 by a fourth branch of government, the Plurinational Electoral Organ, whose highest body is the Supreme Electoral Court.

== Latest elections ==
=== 2025 Bolivian general election ===
On 19 October 2025, Bolivian voters elected Rodrigo Paz Pereira, a senator from the Christian Democratic Party, as Bolivia's president with 55% of the vote in the second round, marking the first time in Bolivian history that the presidency changed hands through a runoff election and ending two decades of MAS dominance. Incumbent party MAS suffered near total annihilation, retaining only two seats in the Chamber of Deputies and losing all seats in the Senate. Paz Pereira took the office of president on 8 November 2025.

== Other elections and referendum ==
=== 2015 Autonomy referendum ===
On September 20, 2015, five western and central departments—Cochabamba, Chuquisaca, La Paz, Oruro, and Potosí—voted on whether to approve "organic charters" (constitutions of autonomous governance), as did three municipalities and two indigenous territories. Voters in all five departments rejected their charters of autonomy, which were drafted by MAS-IPSP–led legislatures.

Department	Yes votes	%	No votes	%	Blank	Null	Total ballots cast	Eligible voters	Turnout as % of electorate
Cochabamba	335,464	38.42%	537,706	61.58%	17,910	57,930	949,010	1,137,872	83.4%
Chuquisaca	99,819	42.57%	134,652	57.43%	5,917	18,057	267,445	324,587	
La Paz	425,605	31.94%	906,759	68.06%	30,159	88,885	1,026,228		
Oruro	59,119	25.98%	168,443	74.02%	5,800	14,064		297,217	
Potosí	93,705	31.92%	199,823	68.08%	8,278	21,546	323,352	408,131	79.2%
Sources: "Referendo autonómico: A cómputo final ganó el No en cinco departamentos". Agencia de Noticias Fides. 2015-09-25.

=== 2011 Special municipal election ===
A special election is due be held for the mayor of five cities where mayors have stepped down or been indicted. In July 2011, the Supreme Electoral Tribunal formally convoked the elections for mayor in three cities: Sucre, Quillacollo, and Pazña for December 18, 2011.

City	Outgoing Mayor (Party)	Notes
Sucre, Chuquisaca	Jaime Barrón (PAÍS)	Resigned in July 2010 under indictment for May 24, 2008 violence
Quillacollo, Cochabamba	Héctor Cartagena (UNE)	
Punata, Cochabamba	Víctor Balderrama (Insurgente Martín Uchu)	Suspended under indictment for aggravated rape of a minor on August 10, 2010 (convicted September 2011); pledged to resign to allow new elections
Pazña, Oruro	Víctor Centeno (MAS-IPSP)	Resigned on 15 June 2010 under "psychological pressure and regional divisions"
Catacora, La Paz		

== See also ==
- Electoral calendar
- Electoral system
