= Double simultaneous vote =

Method of holding two elections with one vote

Double simultaneous vote (DSV) is a feature of some electoral systems in which multiple offices – such as the president and members of a legislature – are elected through a single vote cast for a party. It can be combined with other electoral systems; in Uruguay DSV is used to elect the president and members of the Senate and Chamber of Representatives, with the presidential election also using the two-round system; if no party/presidential candidate receives a majority of the vote, a second round is held for the presidential election.

The initial republican constitutions of several countries in the Commonwealth of Nations, such as Kenya, Guyana and Zambia, provided for presidential elections by double simultaneous vote. Occasionally, as in Tanganyika, a variant was used whereby the candidate who won a plurality of constituencies (as opposed to a plurality of votes) would be elected. Such systems have also been used in Latin America.

== Use ==
| Country | First election | | Second election | | Third election | | Simultaneous votes |
| Country | Offices | System | Offices | System | Offices | System | Simultaneous votes |
|---|---|---|---|---|---|---|---|
| Angola | Members of the National Assembly | Party-list PR | President | FPTP | | | Closed list party vote + personal vote |
| Bolivia | President (first round) | TRS | Chamber of Deputies | AMS | Senate | Party-list PR | Personal vote + mixed single vote + closed list party vote |
| Guyana | Members of the National Assembly | Party-list PR | President | FPTP | | | Closed list party vote + personal vote |
| Uruguay | President (first round) | TRS | Chamber of Representatives | Party-list PR | Chamber of Senators | Party-list PR | Personal vote + 2x closed list party vote |
| Zambia | President (first round) | TRS | National Assembly | Party-list PR in a parallel voting system | | | Personal vote + closed list party vote |

== See also ==
- Straight-ticket voting
