= Semi-proportional representation =

Family of electoral systems

Semi-proportional representation characterizes multi-winner electoral systems which allow some representation of smaller parties or candidates, but produce results that do not always reflect the strength of the competing political forces in a way that is proportional to the shares of the votes they receive. Semi-proportional voting systems are between proportional systems like party-list proportional representation or single transferable vote and winner-take-all systems. Examples of semi-proportional systems include the single non-transferable vote, limited voting, and parallel voting.

There are different measures of proportionality, and no objective threshold, so opinions differ on what constitutes a semi-proportional system, a non-proportional system and a proportional system.

== Single-vote systems ==
=== Semi-proportional systems ===
Election systems in which a party can achieve its due share of seats (proportionality) only by coordinating its voters are usually considered to be semi-proportional. They are not non-proportional or majoritarian, since in the perfect case the outcome will be proportional and in many cases it is close to proportional, but they are not universally proportional either, since the perfect case is not guaranteed without coordination. Such systems include the single non-transferable vote and cumulative voting, both of which are commonly used to elect a range of members based on party identification) and achieve approximately-proportional outcomes while maintaining simplicity and reducing the cost of election administration. Under these systems, parties may coordinate voters by limiting the size of the party slate or by using complex vote management schemes where voters are asked to randomize which candidate(s) they support or vote in specified ways, such as through differently-worded voting cards.

These systems are notable for the absence of an ordered party list. Candidates may coordinate their campaigns, and present or be presented as agents of a party, but voters may choose to support one candidate among the said group but not the others (that is, panachage is permitted).

=== Single transferable vote ===
Some writers consider the single transferable vote to be semi-proportional because of its favoritism towards major parties, sometimes caused by a combination of the Droop quota in small districts, as well as the vote management that may be involved when optional preferential voting is used, producing exhausted ballots. On the other hand, some describe it as proportional on the grounds that it is proportional in the limit of infinitely-large constituencies. However, on party basis, if first preferences are used as guide, STV is only proportional for solid coalitions, if voters rank candidates along party lines and no significant number of votes cross party lines. The proportionality of STV, as measured by first preferences, breaks down if voters are split across party lines or choose to mark preferences candidates of different parties. Under STV, each elected member is elected by the exact same number of votes (the quota) or something very close to it, so proportionality is produced that way.

=== Other ===
Other forms of semi-proportional representation are based on, or at least use, party lists to work. Looking to the electoral systems effectively in use around the world, there are three general methods to reinforce the winner-take-all principle of representation (but not necessarily majoritarianism or majority rule, see electoral inversion and plurality) starting from basic PR mechanisms: parallel voting, the majority bonus system (MBS), and extremely reduced constituency magnitude.

In additional member systems (AMS), the number of additional members may not be sufficient to balance the disproportionality of the original system, thereby producing less than proportional results. When this imbalance is created intentionally, the result could be described as a semi-proportional system — for example, in the Welsh Senedd, where only 33.3% of members are compensatory. The electoral system commonly referred to in Britain as the "additional member system" is also used for the Scottish Parliament and the London Assembly, with generally proportional results. Similarly, in vote transfer based mixed single vote systems, the number of compensatory seats may be too low (or too high) to achieve proportionality. Such a system is used in Hungary in local elections. The "scorporo" system used for the Parliament of Italy from 1993 to 2005 and the electoral system for the National Assembly of Hungary since 1990 are also special cases, based on parallel voting, but also including compensatory mechanisms – which however are insufficient for providing proportional results.

A majority bonus system takes an otherwise proportional system based on multi-member constituencies, and introduces disproportionality by granting additional seats to the first party or alliance. Majority bonuses help produce landslide victories similar to those which occur in elections under plurality systems. The majority bonus system was first introduced by Benito Mussolini to win the election of 1924. It has remained in use in Italy, as well as seeing some use in San Marino, Greece, and France.

The simplest mechanism to reinforce major parties in PR system is to severely restrict the number of seats per electoral district, which increases the Droop quota (the number of votes needed to be guaranteed a seat).

The last main group usually considered semi-proportional consists of parallel voting models. The system used for the Chamber of Deputies of Mexico since 1996 is considered a parallel voting system, modified by a list-seat ceiling (8%) for over-representation of parties.

Semi-proportional electoral systems can increase political polarization.

== Usage ==
| Country | Legislative body | Latest election (year) | Type of majoritarian system | (Seats per constituency) | Electoral system | Total seats | Governmental system | Notes |
|---|---|---|---|---|---|---|---|---|
| Andorra | General Council | 2018 | Mixed-member majoritarian | 2 (local districts) / 14 (nationwide constituency) | Parallel voting / superposition (MMM): Party block voting (PBV) locally + list PR nationwide | 28 | Parliamentary system | |
| Democratic Republic of the Congo | National Assembly | 2018 | Mixed-member majoritarian | 1–17 | Coexistence mixed majoritarian (MMM): First-past-the-post (FPTP/SMP) in single-member districts and List PR in multi-member districts (Largest remainder) | 500 | | |
| Djibouti | National Assembly | 2018 | Mixed-member majoritarian | 3–28 | Fusion / majority jackpot (MBS): 80% of seats (rounded to the nearest integer) in each constituency are awarded to the party receiving the most votes (party block voting), remaining seats are allocated proportionally to other parties receiving over 10% (closed list, D'Hondt method) | 65 | Presidential system | |
| France | French Polynesia Assembly | 2018 | Mixed-member majoritarian | 4–17 | Two-round majority bonus system (MBS) in multi-member constituencies | 57 | | |
| Georgia | Parliament | 2020 | Mixed-member majoritarian | 1 (local districts), 120 (national constituency) | Parallel voting / superposition (MMM): Party-list PR (closed list) + First-past-the-post (FPTP/SMP) | 150 | Parliamentary system | |
| Greece | | | Mixed-member majoritarian | | Majority bonus system (MBS) | | | |
| Guinea | National Assembly | 2020 | Mixed-member majoritarian | 1 (local districts), 76 (national constituency) | Parallel voting / superposition (MMM): Party-list PR (Hare quota) + First-past-the-post (FPTP/SMP) | 114 | | |
| Hungary | National Assembly (Országgyűlés) | 2018 | Mixed-member majoritarian | 1 (local districts), 93 (national constituency) | Supermixed / Mixed-member majoritarian (MMM): First-past-the-post (FPTP/SMP) + national list-PR for 93 seats (combination of parallel voting and positive vote transfer) | 199 | Parliamentary system | Before the 2014, a different mixed system was used with a two-round system in single-member districts |
| Iraq | | | | | Single non-transferable vote (SNTV) | | | |
| Italy | Chamber of Deputies | 2018 | Mixed-member majoritarian | 1 (local districts), 12 (Italians abroad constituency), ?-? (multi-member districts) | Superposition / Mixed-member majoritarian (MMM) using a single vote List PR + First-past-the-post (FPTP/SMP) | 630 | Parliamentary system | |
| Italy | Senate | 2018 | Mixed-member majoritarian | 1 (local districts), 6 (Italians abroad constituency), ?-? (multi-member districts) | Superposition / Mixed-member majoritarian (MMM) using a single vote List PR + First-past-the-post (FPTP/SMP) | 315 | Parliamentary system | |
| Republic of Korea (South Korea) | National Assembly | 2020 | Mixed-member majoritarian | 1 (local districts), 17 supplementary seats (parallel voting), 30 additional seats (AMS), | Supermixed / Mixed-member majoritarian (MMM): First-past-the-post (FPTP/SMP) and List PR (hybrid of parallel voting and AMS) | 300 | Presidential system | |
| Kuwait | | | | | Single non-transferable vote (SNTV) | | | |
| Kyrgyzstan | Supreme Council | 2021 | Mixed-member majoritarian | 1 (local districts), 54 (nationwide constituency) | Parallel voting / superposition (MMM): Party-list PR (open list) + First-past-the-post (FPTP/SMP) | 90 | Presidential system | |
| Lithuania | Seimas | 2020 | Mixed-member majoritarian | 1 (local districts), 70 (nationwide constituency) | Parallel voting / superposition (MMM): Two-round system (TRS) for 71 seats + List PR (Largest remainder) for 70 seats | 141 | Semi-presidential system | |
| Madagascar | National Assembly | 2019 | Mixed-member majoritarian | 1–2 | Coexistence: First-past-the-post (FPTP/SMP) in 87 single-member districts, party-list PR (Closed list, highest averages method) in 32 two-member districts (64 seats in binomial system) | 151 | Semi-presidential system | |
| Mauritania | National Assembly | 2018 | Mixed-member majoritarian | 1–3 (local districts), 40 (nationwide constituency) | Coexistence+superposition (parallel) supermixed/hybrid: Two-round system (TRS) in single-member districts, two-round block voting (BV) in dual-member districts, and List PR (simple quota largest remainder; closed-list) in larger districts + twice 20 nationally List PR (one set of 20 reserved for women) | 157 | Semi-presidential system | |
| Monaco | National Council | 2018 | Mixed-member majoritarian | 24 (nationwide constituency) | Superposition / Mixed-member majoritarian (MMM) using a single (panachage) ballot: Plurality block voting (BV) in single nationwide constituency for 16 seats; D'Hondt method (8 seats) | 24 | Parliamentary system | |
| Palestine | Legislative Council | 2006 | Mixed-member majoritarian | 1–9 (local districts), 66 (nationwide constituency) | Parallel voting / superposition (MMM): First-past-the-post (FPTP/SMP) in single-member districts and Plurality block voting (BV) in two-seat districts for 66 seats in total (some reserved for Christians) + List PR for 66 seats | 132 | Semi-presidential system | In the 1996 elections, 88 PLC members were chosen from several multi-member constituencies via block voting |
| Panama | National Assembly | 2019 | Mixed-member majoritarian | | Coexistence mixed majoritarian (MMM): First-past-the-post (FPTP/SMP) in single-member districts, Saripolo or Sartori method (Largest remainder, but remainders only for those with no seats) in multi-member districts | 71 | Presidential system | |
| Philippines | House of Representatives | 2019 | Mixed-member majoritarian | 1 (local districts), 61 (nationwide constituency) | Parallel voting / superposition (MMM): First-past-the-post (FPTP/SMP) in single-member districts (243 in 2019) + List PR (closed lists; modified Hare quota with 3-seat cap and no remainders) (61 in 2019) | 304 | Presidential system | |
| Russian Federation | State Duma | 2021 | Mixed-member majoritarian | | Parallel voting / superposition (MMM): First-past-the-post (FPTP/SMP) and List PR | 450 | Semi-presidential system | |
| San Marino | | | | | Majority bonus system (MBS) | | Parliamentary system | |
| Scotland | Parliament | 2021 | Mixed-member majoritarian | 73 (constituency), 56 (7 list MSPs elected in each of the 8 regions) | Additional Member System (AMS) | 129 | Parliamentary system | |
| Senegal | | 2017 | Mixed-member majoritarian | | Parallel | 165 | Presidential system | |
| Seychelles | | 2020 | Mixed-member majoritarian | | Parallel | 35 | Presidential system | |
| Singapore | | 2020 | Mixed-member majoritarian | | First-past-the-post (FPTP/SMP) and party block voting (PBV) | 104 (93 directly elected) | | |
| Sudan | | 2015 | Mixed-member majoritarian | | Parallel | 450 | | |
| Switzerland | Council of States Only in: names of cantons | | | 2 | Single non-transferable vote (SNTV) | 46 | | |
| Taiwan | | 2020 | Mixed-member majoritarian | | Parallel | 113 | | |
| Tajikistan | | 2020 | Mixed-member majoritarian | | Parallel | 63 | | |
| Thailand | | 2019 (using MMP) | Mixed-member majoritarian | | Parallel | 500 | | The next election is scheduled to be held under parallel voting again, after one election (2019) held using a single vote MMP system |
| British Overseas Territories (United Kingdom) | Gibraltar | | | | Limited voting (LV) | | | |
| British Overseas Territories (United Kingdom) | Pitcairn Islands | | | | Single non-transferable vote (SNTV) | | | |
| Vanuatu | | | | | Single non-transferable vote (SNTV) | | | |
| Venezuela | National Assembly | 2020 | Mixed-member majoritarian | | Parallel voting (MMM): First-past-the-post (FPTP/SMP) and list PR | 280 (277 directly elected) | Presidential system | |
| Zimbabwe | National Assembly | 2018 | Mixed-member majoritarian | 1 (local districts), 10 (proportional constituencies) | Mixed-member majoritarian (MMM): 210 seats by first-past-the-post (FPTP/SMP) in local districts 60 seats reserved for women by list PR | 270 | Presidential system | Voters cast a single vote |
