= Wasted vote =

Votes that do not impact an election

In electoral systems, a wasted vote is any vote cast that is not "used" to elect a winner, and so is not represented in the outcome. However, the term is vague and ill-defined, having been used to refer to a wide variety of unrelated concepts and metrics. The analysis depends on the way a "wasted vote" is defined.

Wasted votes seldom affect each party equally irrespective of the system that produces them. More wasted votes for one party and fewer for another create a chamber of elected members that is not proportional. Distortions produced by wasted votes work against the aim of fairly reflecting the wishes of the electorate. However, a system that produces wasted votes may prevent instability caused by many parties being elected to the legislature.

== Terminology ==
There are at least two different types of wasted votes:

- Lost votes are votes that make no impact on which candidates are elected. These votes do not actually elect anyone. They are cast for defeated candidates.
- Excess votes (surplus votes) are votes that a successful candidate receives above and beyond what they needed to be elected (anything more than one vote more than the nearest competitor or above the quota).

Some use the term "wasted vote" to refer only to "lost votes", while others use the term to refer to the sum of lost votes and excess votes.

The wasted vote share is calculated as:

$v_{wasted}=\sum_{i=1}^nv_i$

where $v_i$ is the vote share of unrepresented party $i$ and $n$ is the overall number of unrepresented parties. The lost vote can be given as a percentage of the total number of votes or as the absolute number of votes.

== By electoral system ==
=== First-past-the-post voting ===
In first-past-the-post voting, votes for candidates lower than the first or second place may be considered wasted since the strategic voting choice would involve picking the lesser of two evils among the top two frontrunners. The proportion of votes that are wasted in a district may exceed half of votes cast. This situation sometimes leads to an overall result where in total more votes are cast for defeated candidates than are used to elect anyone.

=== Proportional representation ===
In proportional electoral systems, representatives are elected in rough proportion to voter preferences, each being elected by about the same proportion of votes, resulting in almost all votes being used to elect someone. This results in fewer wasted votes than in plurality voting. This also results in each party being represented roughly in proportion to its share of the overall popular vote.

In list PR systems, this relationship is established based on party votes. In single transferable voting, most winners in each district are elected by the same number of votes (surplus votes are transferred away), and the rest of the successful candidates are elected by about that same number of votes, even if that number does not meet the quota. Under both list PR and STV systems, 80 to 90 percent of votes or more are used to elect the winners. That rule holds true both at the district level and overall.

== Thresholds and lost votes ==
In proportional representation, wasted votes increase with a higher electoral threshold. Higher electoral thresholds may prevent some candidates from being elected. Even with no explicit electoral threshold, the natural electoral threshold is determined by the district magnitude, the number of members elected in each district. Decreasing district magnitude (electing fewer members in the contest) is one of the ways to reduce political fragmentation in the chamber. However, it causes some wasted votes and produces more disproportionality. Under proportional representation, the more members being elected in the contest, the more fair the result. (Under non-proportional methods, the more members being elected in the contest, generally the less fair the result.)

On occasion, lost votes in proportional representation (arising from high electoral threshold) have resulted in a party winning an outright majority of seats without winning an outright majority of votes. For instance, in the 2002 Turkish general election, the AKP won more than two-thirds of the seats in the Turkish Parliament with just 34.28 percent of the vote due to a large electoral threshold of 10%. In the 2013 Bavarian federal state election in Germany, the CSU party won less than a majority of votes but won a majority of seats.

=== Ranked voting ===
Ranked voting, unlike traditional plurality systems and list PR systems, allow voters to redirect what would otherwise be a wasted vote to other candidates. The goal of ranked voting is to reduce the waste that occurs in many elections due to votes being cast for unsuccessful candidates or by the existence of winners' excessive leads over their nearest contenders. Additionally, the low number of wasted votes in conjunction with quota, used to measure the potentially wasted votes, ensures that most elected members are elected with the same number of votes, thereby producing fairness.

In instant-runoff voting, a single-winner election system, the quota is a majority of votes cast, or at least a majority of votes still in play when the seats are filled. The votes cast for the last-surviving losing candidate and those cast for the winning candidate if that candidate received votes in excess of what they needed to win are wasted. But at most, this will be less than half the votes cast, which is considerably fewer than some first-past-the-post elections where two-thirds or more of the votes may not be used to elect the winner.

When not all candidates are ranked by every voter, ranked vote systems can produce exhausted ballots – ballots with votes that could have been redirected to lower preferences if the voter had ranked all candidates. These can be considered part of the wasted vote.

Under the single transferable voting (STV), a multi-winner election system, the quota is something smaller than half of the votes. But because multiple members are elected, a large majority of votes cast are used to elect the winners. Thus, wasted votes are less common compared to single-winner ranked voting. Under STV, the number of votes not used to elect someone is commonly the same or close to one quota, so about 16 percent in a five-seat district, for example. Usually STV systems use the Droop quota.

A vote can also be thought of as at least partially wasted when a vote has been given to a candidate who is a lower preference for the voter than a higher-ranked candidate. For instance, the Australian Electoral Commission tells voters that "there is no such thing as a wasted vote" due to preferential voting preventing candidates from finishing in third place or lower in cases where the last runoff was between only two candidates. However, some votes may be considered partially wasted votes if they were transferred and then used to elect a lower-ranked preference. Excess votes and votes not being used to elect a winner occur often under first-past-the-post.

== Measuring the effect of wasted votes ==
Measuring wasted votes is done by examining the difference between how votes are cast and how seats are allocated. Nation-wide, it can be done by examining parties' vote shares. It may also take place at the level of electoral districts, which act as sub-units of the whole. Sometimes, it is done where party lists are not used and may be done whether only a single member or several members are elected in a district.

One measure of proportionality of representation is the Gallagher index. This measures the gap for each party between what was their share of votes and the share of seats it did receive.

Comparing wasted votes between parties in legislatures can also be measured by the efficiency gap. The efficiency gap is a frequently discussed method of measuring gerrymandering. A non-zero efficiency gap almost always indicates more wasted votes for one party and less for another, thus creating a disproportionate chamber of elected members. Where the first-past-the-post voting or other winner-take-all systems artificially create two types of voters, with the minority voters unrepresented in each, but in reverse ascendancy, the regionalized under-representation of the respective parties in each region may balance out, and the large number of wasted votes may be hidden in a system where the measure of the waste of a party's votes is offset in a relative manner. Such a situation may be the case when the large number of wasted Republican votes in New York are offset by the large number of wasted Democratic votes in Texas, or in Alberta, Canada, where urban provincial seats in the 2020s are held disproportionately by the social democratic NDP, while almost all rural seats are held disproportionately by the right-wing United Conservative Party. Such regionalized party-specific under-representation leads to polarized regional political and social behaviour, such as strategic voting.

Regionalized election patterns, where one party has repeatedly taken the same seat, lead to the artificial importance of swing seats and swing jurisdictions. Efficient election campaigns focus on swing seats because votes gained in swing seats are more likely to result in increased representation.

== Example calculations ==
=== Example 1 ===
Consider an election where candidates A, B and C receive 6000, 3100 and 701 votes respectively.

If this election is conducted to fill a single seat by a plurality or majority, Candidate A is elected because they received a majority of the vote. The wasted votes are:

- All 3801 votes for candidates B and C, since these "lost votes" did not elect any candidate
- In the wider definition, the 2899 excess votes for candidate A are wasted, since A would still have won with only 3101 votes. Therefore, 6700 out of 9801 votes are wasted.

If the same votes for A, B and C are cast in a d'Hondt method election for three parties (A, B and C) running for a fair share of 12 seats, then the seats are split 8-4-0 for A-B-C. The wasted votes are:

- The 701 votes for party C, which won no seats (the quota is about 754).
- In the wide definition, also wasted are:
  - 399 votes for A, since A would still have won eight seats with only 5601 votes against 3100 and 701 (with 5600 votes for A, the last seat would go to C)
  - 299 votes for B, since with only 2800 votes, B would lose the last seat to C

A majority of votes are wasted in a single-seat plurality election due to the large number of votes cast for unelected candidates or the successful candidate taking many more votes than they need to win. Multi-seat constituencies reduce the number of wasted votes as long as proportional representation is used. (When used with plurality block voting or other winner-take-all systems, multi-member constituencies may see the wasted vote exceed 50 percent.)

=== Example 2 ===
Consider an election where candidates A, B, C and D receive 6000, 3100, 2400 and 1701 votes respectively. This produces a total of 13201 valid votes where the majority is 6601.

If this is an instant-runoff voting election for a single seat, no one has a majority of votes so Candidate D is eliminated and the votes for them are transferred. If over 600 of them go to A, A has a majority and is declared elected; if instead the vote transfer from D does not produce a majority winner, then C would be eliminated (or B if C's new vote total surpassed B's) and either A or B (or C) would have a majority and would be declared a winner. The wasted votes are:

- 6600 at the most and potentially as few as 4300

If this is a vote using the single transferable vote for two seats, the Droop quota is 4401. Candidate A has that in the first count and is elected. Transfer of A's surplus may give B a quota and victory; otherwise, D is eliminated. It is likely that the second seat would be filled by someone with quota, hence wasted votes would have to be less than a third of votes cast. If two win seats by having quota, the wasted votes are one quota at the most so likely:

- less than 4400

It could be that the second seat is not filled by a candidate with quota, but by the candidate who is merely the most popular when the field of candidates thins to two. If so, the number of effective votes could be no greater than 4101, but that would assume a great number of exhausted votes. But even so, the wasted votes could be:

- no more than 4101

== Historical examples ==
=== Proportional representation ===
In the 1993 Polish election, the wasted vote reached 34.4 percent. The use of electoral thresholds, set at 5% for party lists and 8% for coalitions, resulted in some parties not being eligible for representation. The other 66 percent of votes were used to fairly allocate the seats to the remaining parties.

In the Russian parliamentary elections in 1995, more than 45 percent of party votes were wasted, due to the 5 percent electoral threshold. Nineteen of the parties that did not exceed the electoral threshold did win district seats so did have some representation. In 1998, the Russian Constitutional Court found the threshold legal, taking into account limits in its use.

In the 2002 Turkish general election, as many as 46.3 percent (14,545,438) of votes were cast for parties that went unrepresented in the parliament. An unusually large electoral threshold of 10 percent prevented all but two parties from taking seats. The justification for such a high threshold was to prevent multi-party coalitions and put a stop to the fragmentation of political parties seen in the 1960s and 1970s. However, coalitions ruled between 1991 and 2002, but mainstream parties continued to be fragmented; in the 2002 elections, as much as 45 percent of votes were cast for parties that failed to reach the threshold and were thus unrepresented in the parliament. All parties that won seats in 1999 failed to cross the threshold, thus giving Justice and Development Party 66 percent of the seats.

In New Zealand, the wasted vote was only 1.5 percent in the 2005 general election, 4.6 percent in the 2017 election, and 7.7 percent in the 2020 election.

In the Ukrainian elections of March 2006, 22 percent of voters were effectively disenfranchised due to an electoral threshold of 3 percent of overall votes, including invalid votes. In the 2007 Ukrainian parliamentary election held under the same system, fewer voters supported minor parties and the total percentage of disenfranchised voters fell to about 12 percent.

In Bulgaria, 24 percent of voters cast their ballots for parties that would not gain representation in the elections of 1991 and 2013.

In Germany in 2013, 15.7 percent or 6.9 million votes were unrepresented.

In the 2015 Israeli legislative election, the wasted vote was 7.1 percent. The election is held with the country as a single district, which reduces the potential effective threshold to a minimum but an electoral threshold of 3.25 percent means that several minor parties did not get representation.

When districts are used under PR, waste of district votes may occur. In the Danish general elections in 2015 and 2019, in the Faroe Islands, where only two members were elected and 23,000 votes cast, the wasted vote reached 51.3 percent (11,000) in 2015 and 46.2 percent in 2019. In Greenland, where two members were elected and 20,000 votes cast, in 2015 21.96 percent (4300 votes) of votes were wasted and in 2019, 34.2 percent of votes were wasted.

In the 2015 Danish general election, where MMP was used, the district magnitude in Denmark proper was 175 seats. The wasted vote calculated by the formula above was 0.92 percent. The wasted votes in Faroe Islands and Greenland, referred to above, made up a very small proportion of the total 3.5 million votes cast across the country.

In the Netherlands, the wasted vote was 1.6 percent in the 2017 general election and 1.99 percent in the 2021 election. The low percentage of wasted votes in the Netherlands was caused by a low electoral threshold. The threshold was set at 0.67 percent, which is the same as the effective threshold produced by electing 150 seats in a single district covering the entire country.

In the 2019 European Parliament election in France, 19.79 percent of voters were unrepresented. In the 2020 Slovak parliamentary election, 28.39 percent of all valid votes did not gain representation. In the 2021 Czech legislative election, 19.76 percent of voters were not represented. In the 2022 Slovenian parliamentary election, 24 percent of the vote went to parties that did not reach the electoral threshold. In the German federal state of Saarland 2022 election, the total wasted vote was 22.3 percent. In the 2022 Latvian parliamentary election, unrepresented voters reached 29 percent.

Examples of low wasted vote are the 2018 Swedish general election with a wasted vote of 1.5 percent, and the 2019 Swiss federal election with a wasted vote share of 1.3 percent, caused by natural electoral thresholds.

=== Plurality voting ===
Under the United States Electoral College system in 2024, 3.6 million votes were cast for the Republican candidate in New York; 4.8 million votes were cast in Texas for the Democratic candidate. None of those votes resulted in any electoral college seats.

== Legal status ==
For proportional representation, the German Federal Constitutional Court rejected in 2011 and in 2014 an electoral threshold for the European Parliament that led to wasted votes based on the principle of one person, one vote. In the case of Turkey, the Parliamentary Assembly of the Council of Europe declared in 2004 the 10% electoral threshold excessive and asked Turkey to lower it, which would reduce wasted votes. On 30 January 2007, the European Court of Human Rights ruled that the 10 percent electoral threshold in Turkey does not violate the right to free elections guaranteed by the European Convention of Human Rights. It held, however, that this same threshold could violate the Convention if not justified. It was justified in the case of Turkey in order to stabilize the volatile political situation over recent decades.

== Mitigation ==
Different electoral systems tend to have different amounts of wasted votes. An electoral system that reduces the number of wasted votes can be considered desirable on grounds of fairness or because of the danger that voters who feel their votes make no difference may feel detached from their government and the democratic process. Such disheartened voters may simply stay home, which is taken as an affront to democracy, or even go to the lengths of acting out their anger through social violence and direct action. Proportional representation was adopted in several countries that at the time were experiencing high levels of political and class violence and disorder, such as Belgium, Ireland, and the Netherlands. Two-round systems can reduce wasted votes.

=== Strategic voting ===
Strategic voting, also known as tactical voting, is a voting behaviour that attempts to reduce the chance of a vote being wasted. A voter misrepresents their true sentiment in order to try to ensure that their vote is used to elect someone. In election campaigns, a candidate who has good chance of being elected may appeal to voters who support a less-popular candidate to vote instead for themself for tactical reasons on the basis that a vote for their preferred candidate is likely to be wasted.

== See also ==
- Approval voting
- Electoral competition
- Electoral fusion
- Spoilt vote
- No taxation without representation
- One man, one vote
- Vote splitting
- Voter suppression
- Political bias
- Political censorship
- Political egalitarianism
