= Scorporo =

Mixed electoral system formerly used in Italy

Scorporo (Italian: [ˈskɔrporo], lit. 'parceling out') is a partially compensatory mixed-member majoritarian electoral system, sometimes referred to as a negative vote transfer system (NVT), whereby a portion of members are elected in single-member districts (SMDs) and a portion are elected from a list. It may be fully defined as a parallel voting system, which excludes a portion (up to 100%) of the SMD winners' votes in electing the proportional tier, to result in a more proportional outcome.

The exclusion of a portion of the SMD winners' votes is what makes scorporo fundamentally different from parallel voting and somewhat closer to the additional-member system in the United Kingdom (a form of mixed-member proportional representation) in theory; however, the design proved particularly susceptible to the decoy list (Italian: lista civetta) strategy, and as a result by 2001 had devolved into a de facto parallel voting system. Although the scorporo method is only known to have been used in Italy, a similar version is in used for the National Assembly of Hungary.

== History ==
=== Italy ===
Scorporo was a mechanism in place in the Italian electoral system, which was defined by the Italian electoral law of 1993 (Mattarellum) for the election or allocation of seats in the Chamber of Deputies and the Senate of the Republic (Law 277/1993), and was subsequently repealed in December 2005 and replaced by the Italian electoral law of 2005 (Calderoli Law, best known as Porcellum). It consisted of subtracting the votes obtained by candidates associated with the same list who were elected in single-member constituencies under the majoritarian system from the total votes for a list in the proportional portion of the vote. The aim of the mechanism was to provide greater representation to lists with few candidates elected under the majoritarian system, consistent with the purposes of applying the proportional quota.

To circumvent the proportional quota, decoy lists (liste civetta) were used, which were fictitious lists to which candidates in single-member constituencies were linked. In the 2001 Italian general election, one of these decoy lists, linked to the centre-right coalition, took the name Movement for the Abolition of the Decoupling and for the Respect of Popular Sovereignty – for the Abolition of the Decoupling, for Government Stability, No to Reversals Movimento per l'abolizione dello scorporo e per il rispetto della sovranità popolare – per l'abolizione dello scorporo, per la stabilità di governo, no ai ribaltoni. The centre-right coalition's sweeping success in those elections led to the paradoxical outcome that it was not possible to assign all the proportional quota seats because there were insufficient candidates on the true proportional lists, particularly those of Forza Italia.

=== Hungary ===
As part of the democratic backsliding and illiberal democracy in Hungary under Viktor Orbán, a system similar to the scorporo was adopted by the second Orbán Government. Still used as of the 2026 Hungarian parliamentary election, it was first adopted in the 2014 Hungarian parliamentary election.

== Implementation ==
Scorporo was in force for elections to the bicameral Italian Parliament based on Law 277/1993 from 1993 to 2005. The system was subject to the specific rules for each chamber. Under this system, members could be elected in two ways:

- 75% of elected members were elected in single member districts (SMDs) using first-past-the-post voting.
- 25% of elected members were elected on list basis based on the proportion of the votes received by the party (using the D'Hondt method), with the exclusion of a proportion of any first-placed winner's votes.

=== Senate of the Republic ===
- List seats were calculated at the regional level.
- All votes for winning candidates were excluded from the list allocation.
- No threshold was applied for list seats.
- The SMD vote and the list vote were linked (mixed single vote) limiting the use of decoy lists (see below).

=== Chamber of Deputies ===
- The list seats were calculated at the national level.
- The number of SMD winner's votes excluded from the list vote was equal to the second place candidate's vote total, representing the number of votes needed to elect the winner in the SMD (i.e. non-wasted votes).
- A 4% threshold was established for parties to qualify for the list seats.
- The local vote and list vote were not tied to each other, thereby providing an incentive for decoy lists.

== Abuse in the 2001 Italian general election ==
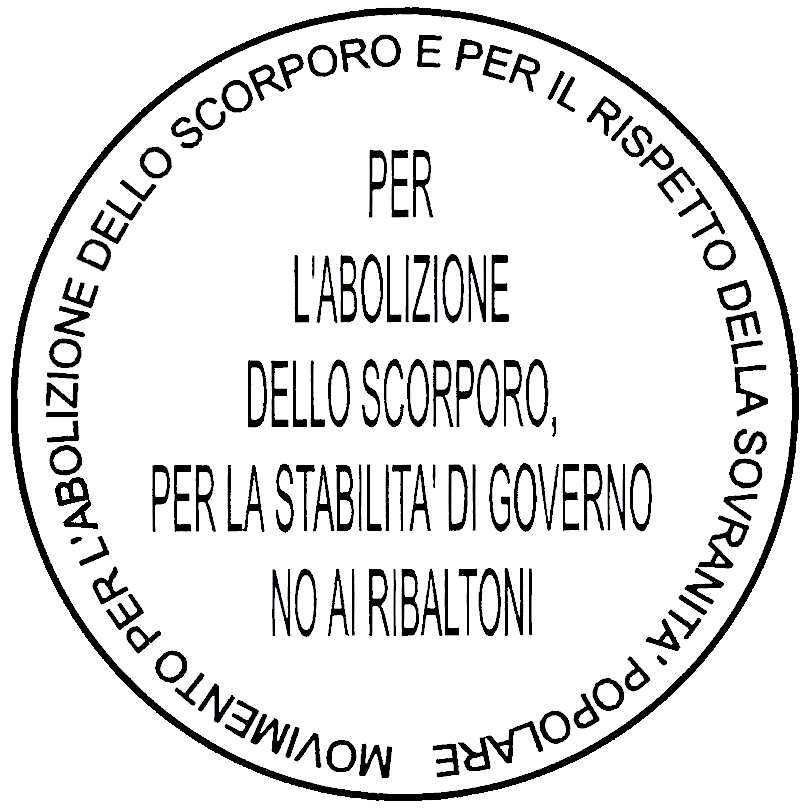
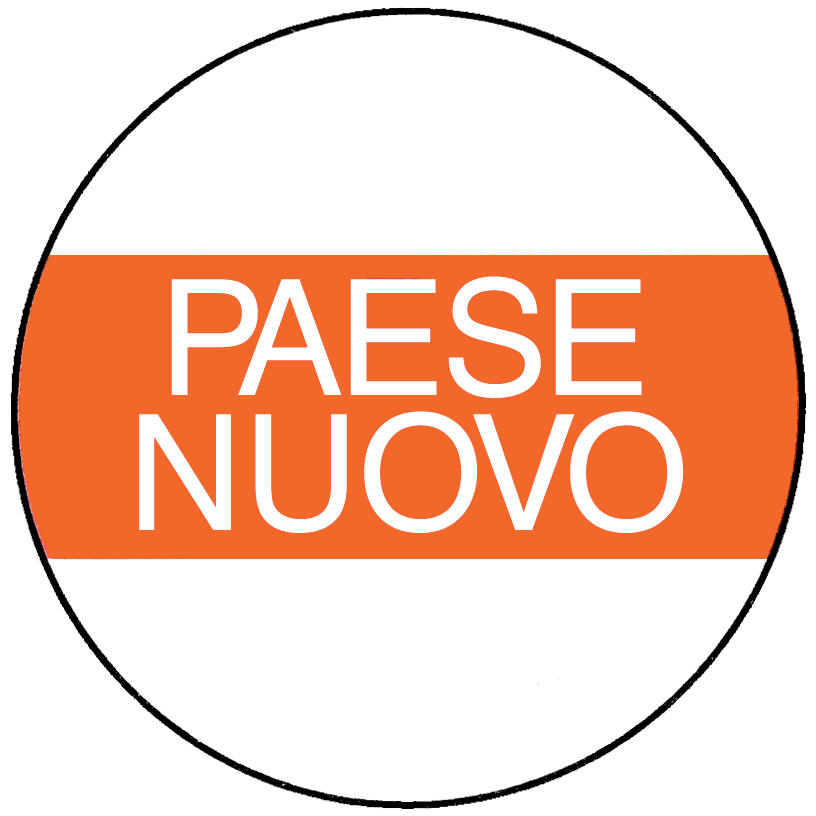
Symbols of the two liste civette

In the 2001 general election, one of the two main electoral alliances (the centre-right coalition known as the House of Freedoms, which opposed the scorporo system), linked many of their constituency candidates to a decoy list for the proportional component under the name Abolish Scorporo. This list was not designed to win proportional seats but only to soak up constituency votes for the House of Freedoms, enabling them to win a larger share of the proportional list seats than they would be entitled to if all candidates were linked other House of Freedoms parties. This intentionally undermined the compensatory nature of the electoral system. As a defensive move, the centre-left coalition, known as The Olive Tree, created their own decoy list under the name New Country (Paese Nuovo).

The decoy lists were extremely successful. Between them, candidates linked to the decoy lists won 360 of the 475 constituency seats, more than half of the total of 630 seats in the Chamber of Deputies. Meanwhile, the decoy lists won a combined total of less than 0.2% of the proportional part of the vote. For the two main coalitions, their vote totals in the proportional component were essentially unaffected by the constituency votes, enabling them to win far more proportional seats than the system was designed for. In the case of Forza Italia (the major political party within the House of Freedoms), the tactic was so successful that it did not have enough candidates in the proportional component, and its list exhausted before it could be awarded all the seats it had won, ultimately missing out on 12 additional seats. This was facilitated by the fact that this particular scorporo system allowed the single-member constituency vote and the proportional list vote not to be linked. Decoy lists are a common issue in all compensatory and pseudo-compensatory systems, and this was not a unique problem for scorporo.

== Abolition ==
Due to Silvio Berlusconi's opposition to the system, as the centre-right coalition won the 2001 general election, Italy ultimately changed to a majority bonus system in 2005 (Porcellum). For the 2018 Italian general election, parallel voting was brought back by the Italian electoral law of 2017 still in use as of 2026, best known as Rosatellum.

== See also ==
- Elections in Italy
- Electoral list
- Italian electoral law of 2015
- Leveling seat
- Mixed-member majoritarian representation
- Proportional representation
