= Split-ticket voting =

Voting for candidates of different parties

Split-ticket voting or ticket splitting is when a voter in an election votes for candidates from different political parties when multiple offices are being decided by a single election, as opposed to straight-ticket voting, where a voter chooses candidates from the same political party for every office up for election. Split-ticket voting can occur in certain mixed-member systems which allow for it, such as mixed-member proportional and parallel voting systems.

Consequently, in closed list electoral systems, which are used most notably in Argentina, Israel, South Africa, and Spain, voters are structurally unable to participate in split-ticket voting. These systems require individuals to vote for a party list, rather than for specific candidates in varying offices.

The behavior is often a result of candidate and voter dynamics; when individuals are evaluating elections based on each candidate's personal appeal, perceived performance, or connection to local issues, they are more likely to bypass partisan electoral norms. It has also been attributed to voters making a conscious choice to balance power in governmental branches between political parties.

== By country ==
=== Australia ===
In Australia, federal elections in recent times have usually involved a House of Representatives election and a half-Senate election occurring on the same day. The states, with the exception of Queensland and Tasmania, also hold elections for both houses of parliament simultaneously. An example of split-ticket voting in Australia is a voter who gives their first preference to the Liberal Party on the House of Representatives ballot paper and to the One Nation party in the Senate.

In the 2013 election, the Senate vote for both the Liberal and Labor parties was considerably lower than their lower house vote, demonstrating that a large number of people voted for a major party in the House of Representatives and a minor party or micro-party in the Senate. There are many reasons why a voter may do this, including the fact that many parties only stand candidates for the Senate (leaving their supporters unable to vote for them on their lower house ballot), the much lower quota required for election to the Senate compared to the House of Representatives (14.3% versus 50%), and a desire to check the power of the government by preventing it from controlling the Senate.

From 1978 to 2008, when the Australian Democrats held representation in the Senate, the Democrats benefited greatly from split-ticket voting, as their Senate vote was always much higher than their House of Representatives vote. The party built its campaigns around "keeping the bastards honest", a reference to holding the balance of power in the Senate so as to prevent the chamber from becoming either a rubber stamp for the government or a tool of obstruction for the opposition.

=== Ghana ===
Ghanaian federal presidential and parliamentary elections are held every four years, and local elections are held before or after a 6-month window. Presidents are elected using the two-round system, while MPs are elected with the first-past-the-post system.

In Ghana, split-ticket voting is called skirt-and-blouse voting, and refers to voting for a President and member of parliament of different parties. It can be seen as a form of protest against particular presidential or legislative candidates, or as a vote of no confidence. The phenomenon of skirt and blouse voting has grown in recent years, with 11 constituencies voting skirt and blouse in 1996 compared to 26 constituencies voting skirt and blouse in 2012.

During the 2024 election, 12% of New Patriotic Party members said that they intended to vote skirt-and-blouse. National Democratic Congress candidate John Dramani Mahama advocated against skirt-and-blouse voting, stating that a strong majority in both the presidency and parliament would allow the government to be more effective.

=== Indonesia ===
During the 2024 Indonesian general election, despite winning the most votes in the legislative election in traditionally PDIP-supporting provinces such as Central Java and Bali, the PDIP presidential ticket, Ganjar-Mahfud, failed to secure victories in those provinces. A similar phenomenon occurred in East Java, where PKB won the most legislative votes, but its presidential ticket, Anies-Muhaimin, also failed to win the province. The eventual winner, Prabowo-Gibran, won 36 out of 38 provinces, securing 58% of the national vote.

=== Italy ===
Since the reintroduction of a mixed electoral system in 2017, ticket splitting had been banned in national elections while some regions allow it. In the 2024 Sardinian regional election, centre-right candidate Paolo Truzzu received 45% losing the election while the parties who supported him got 48.4%. Some later accused of Lega of ticket splitting.

=== Philippines ===
In the Philippines, elections for multiple positions are held on the same day. In elections where the presidency is at stake, the vice presidency is elected separately. Voters have split their ticket to provide checks and balances to the top two positions. In the operation of the 1987 constitution until 2022, the president and vice president came from different parties in three out of four elections. Having the elected president and vice president coming from different parties is seen as undesirable.

The president may also endorse a senatorial slate, and candidates for House representatives and local officials; all of these are elected separately and voters may split their ticket down-ballot.

Split ticket presidential/vice presidential results:

- 1957 Philippine presidential election: Carlos P. Garcia (Nacionalista) was elected president, while Diosdado Macapagal (Liberal) was elected vice president
- 1992 Philippine presidential election: Fidel V. Ramos (Lakas) was elected president, while Joseph Estrada (NPC) was elected vice president
- 1998 Philippine presidential election: Joseph Estrada (LAMMP) was elected president, while Gloria Macapagal Arroyo (Lakas) was elected vice president
- 2010 Philippine presidential election: Benigno Aquino III (Liberal) was elected president, while Jejomar Binay (PDP–Laban) was elected vice president
- 2016 Philippine presidential election: Rodrigo Duterte (PDP–Laban) was elected president, while Leni Robredo (Liberal) was elected vice president

=== United Kingdom ===
In the United Kingdom the Additional Member System is used for the devolved assemblies of Scotland and Wales, as well as the London Assembly and is considered to increase the likelihood to split-ticket. As each voter casts two votes: one vote for a candidate standing in their constituency (with or without an affiliated party), and one vote for a party list standing in a wider region. In the constituency vote a single representative is elected using the traditional First-Past-The-Post system. The regional vote is used to elect multiple representatives from party lists to stand in regional seats, taking into account how many seats were gained by that party in the constituency vote, using a system of proportional representation: the number of seats a party receives will roughly reflect its percentage of the vote. Between the 1997 and 2003 elections in London, Scotland, and Wales between 17 and 28 percent of voters split their tickets.

=== United States ===
In the United States, multiple elections for many different offices are often held on the same day. This may be true of primary elections and may also include the placing of candidates for federal, state, and local offices on the same ballot. One of many possible examples of split-ticket voting in the United States is a voter who seeks to elect the Democratic Party's candidate for the Senate, the Republican Party's candidate for House of Representatives, the Green Party's candidate for County Supervisor, and the Libertarian Party's candidate for Coroner.

One example is the 2004 Montana gubernatorial election, where Democratic gubernatorial candidate Brian Schweitzer was elected governor 50.4% to 46.0%, while incumbent Republican President George W. Bush defeated Democrat John F. Kerry 59% to 39%. This suggests that a large number of the electorate voted for a split-ticket, selecting a Republican presidential candidate and a Democratic Party gubernatorial candidate. One later example is the 2016 West Virginia gubernatorial election, where Democrat (now Republican) Jim Justice won by eight points while Republican presidential candidate Donald Trump won in the state with 68% of the vote. Jim Justice later switched as a Republican in 2017. Four years later, in the 2020 United States Senate election in Maine, incumbent Susan Collins won by a 8.6% margin against Democratic challenger Sara Gideon, despite Joe Biden defeating Donald Trump in Maine by a 9.1% margin.

==== 20th century ====
Split-ticket voting in America was an electoral rarity before the 1950s; in 1948, for example, just six states split tickets between President and Senator. Political scientists generally locate the American emergence of ticket splitting in the 1950s and 1960s. As party loyalty began to decline and campaigns began centering around candidates, driven by television and emphasis on candidate image, voters became increasingly willing to evaluate leaders independently of party affiliation. By the late-1960s, split-ticket voting had become common in United States elections. The 1968 presidential election, specifically, featured a strong Electoral College victory for Republican nominee, Richard Nixon, while the Democratic Party maintained control of the House of Representatives by a significant 51-seat margin. Four years later, the nation reelected Nixon in one of the largest victories in American history, while simultaneously electing a Democratic majority in the House by a 50-seat margin.

In 1976, the nation saw a reversal from the increase of split-ticket voting, as Democrats maintained sweeping majorities in both houses of Congress, and Jimmy Carter became the first Democrat to win the presidency since 1964. As a Southern Democrat and Governor of Georgia, Carter benefited from significant regional support in the American South and considerable disillusionment with the Republican Party following the Watergate scandal. Ultimately, the aligned federal government of the Carter years was short-lived: split-ticket voting began its peak just four years later with the election of Ronald Reagan, and a continued Democratic House majority in 1980. Over the course of the 1980s, the Republican Party won three consecutive presidential elections by significant margins, while the nation elected Democrats to lead the House for all 10 years, and the U.S. Senate from 1987-1989.

In the 1990s, split-ticket voting remained prominent in American elections, even as Bill Clinton won the presidency in both 1992 and 1996. The 1994 United States elections in particular resulted in the first Republican House of Representatives majority in forty years, and put Republicans back in the majority in the Senate for the first time since 1986. This electoral result has often been referred to as the "Republican Revolution," and was responsible for the rise of figures like Newt Gingrich.

==== 21st century ====
In the 21st century, split-ticket voting has seen a drastic decline. The 2004 United States elections, specifically, saw a sharp decline in split-tickets among President and Senator with just seven total. 2016 and 2020 saw just one split-ticket victory combined: Republican Susan Collins defeated Sara Gideon by an eight-point margin while Joe Biden won the state of Maine. In the 2020 presidential election, only 16 "crossover districts" — congressional districts that elected a presidential candidate and a House candidate of a different party — were recorded, in comparison to 35 in 2016 and 83 in 2008. The 2020 numbers represent only four percent of the overall congressional districts in the U.S., and a record low. In addition, the 2020 United States Senate elections left six states with a split representation between Democrats and Republicans, in comparison to 21 states with a split representation after 1992. This was attributed to the increasing polarization and nationalization of politics in the U.S., in which members of both political parties have regarded one another with antipathy. That number further decreased to just three states (Wisconsin, Maine, and Pennsylvania) after the 2024 United States Senate elections, representing the fewest split delegations since the ratification of the 17th Amendment. However, after the 2026 United States Senate elections, that number increased to at least 10 due to historic Democratic gains in red states.

Later, in the 2022 United States elections, there was a resurgence in split-ticket voting in a number of states. In some cases, concurrent gubernatorial and Senate races went to candidates of different parties. For example, in Georgia, Republican Brian Kemp defeated Democrat Stacey Abrams in the gubernatorial election by seven points, drastically outperforming Republican Herschel Walker in the concurrent Senate race, which Walker lost to Democrat Raphael Warnock after a runoff election in December. In other cases, there was a performance gap between gubernatorial and Senate candidates in the same state. For example, in Ohio, Governor Mike DeWine won the gubernatorial election by about 26 percentage points, while JD Vance won the concurrent Senate race by less than seven percentage points. The results of the 2022 elections were attributed by experts to the quality of candidates. The number of "crossover districts" also slightly increased from 16 to 23.

In the 2024 United States elections, split-ticket voting saw a slight increase electorally. As Trump, the Republican nominee, won reelection to the presidency after his defeat four years prior, four states split in their results in United States Senate races, with Democrats being elected despite Trump winning the state. However, it was also analyzed that only one of those states, Arizona, saw Trump voters actually back a Democrat; in the three other states, it was analyzed that Republican voters simply failed to vote downballot. ABC News analyzed the correlation between presidential and Senate races was near the record high levels seen in 2020. In North Carolina, the result was split between the presidential and gubernatorial race, as Democrat Josh Stein defeated Republican Lieutenant Governor Mark Robinson in a landslide, while Trump carried the state by nearly 4%. A slew of scandals heavily damaged the Robinson campaign as the election neared; this is often credited as the main reason for Stein's victory. In New Hampshire and Vermont, Republicans Kelly Ayotte won her first term and Phil Scott won reelection as governor, while Democratic presidential nominee Kamala Harris won both states.

==== Notable split-ticket U.S. elections ====
- The 1964 U.S. presidential election in California saw Democrat Lyndon B. Johnson defeat his Republican challenger Barry Goldwater while Republican George Murphy won in the concurrent Senate election in the 1964 California Senate election.
- The 1968 U.S. presidential election in Pennsylvania saw Democratic Vice President Hubert Humphrey defeat his Republican challenger Richard Nixon while Republican Richard Schweiker won in the concurrent Senate election in the 1968 Pennsylvania Senate election.
- The 1968 U.S. presidential election in Maryland saw Democratic Vice President Hubert Humphrey defeat his Republican challenger Richard Nixon while Republican Charles Mathias won in the concurrent Senate election in the 1968 Maryland Senate election.
- The 1984 U.S. presidential election in Minnesota saw Republican Ronald Reagan lose to his Democratic challenger Walter Mondale, his only loss besides D.C., while Republican Rudy Boschwitz won the concurrent Senate election in the 1984 Minnesota Senate election.
- The 1984 U.S. presidential election in Massachusetts saw Republican Ronald Reagan defeat his Democratic challenger Walter Mondale while Democrat John Kerry won election in the concurrent Senate election in a landslide in the 1984 Massachusetts Senate election.
- The 2000 U.S. presidential election in West Virginia saw Republican George W. Bush defeat his Democratic challenger Al Gore while Democrat Robert Byrd won re-election in the concurrent Senate election in a landslide in the 2000 West Virginia Senate election.
- The 2004 North Dakota Senate election saw Democrat Byron Dorgan defeat his Republican challenger by 36 points while John Kerry lost the state by 27 points to George W. Bush in the 2004 concurrent presidential election.
- The 2020 U.S. presidential election in New Hampshire saw Democrat Joe Biden defeat his Republican challenger Donald Trump while Republican Chris Sununu won re-election in the concurrent gubernatorial election in a landslide in the 2020 New Hampshire gubernatorial election.
- The 2020 U.S. presidential election in Vermont saw Democrat Joe Biden defeat his Republican challenger Donald Trump in a landslide while Republican Phil Scott won re-election in the concurrent gubernatorial election in a landslide in the 2020 Vermont gubernatorial election.
- The 2022 Georgia Senate election saw Democrat Raphael Warnock narrowly defeat his Republican challenger Herschel Walker while Democrat Stacey Abrams lost the concurrent gubernatorial election to Republican Brian Kemp in the 2022 Georgia gubernatorial election.
- In the 2024 Senate elections, Democratic candidates Ruben Gallego, Elissa Slotkin, Jacky Rosen, and Tammy Baldwin won races in Arizona, Michigan, Nevada, and Wisconsin respectively while Republican candidate Donald Trump won all states in the concurrent presidential election. Only Gallego got significantly more votes than Democratic candidate Kamala Harris, while all four of their opponents got significantly fewer votes than Trump. Gallego, a Marine Corps combat veteran, and Slotkin, a former CIA analyst with three tours in Iraq, both emphasized their military and national security backgrounds in their campaigns. Political analysts noted that candidates with military service credentials demonstrated stronger appeal to independent voters in competitive districts, contributing to their ability to win in states carried by Trump. Also, the 2024 North Carolina gubernatorial election saw Democratic candidate Josh Stein defeat controversial Republican nominee Mark Robinson by 14.8%, despite Trump also winning North Carolina in the presidential election. This represented an increase in split-ticket outcomes compared to recent elections; the four 2024 Senate races with different presidential and Senate winners were twice as many as in the 2016, 2020, and 2022 Senate elections combined.

== Motivations ==
Although less common, split-ticket voting can potentially be used as a form of tactical voting. One possible example of this is a voter who prefers candidate A but does not believe that candidate A can win the election, so the voter votes for candidate B (who may be of a different political party from candidate A) because candidate B is better than other more competitive candidates C, D, etc.

Split-ticket voting may also occur in elections where multiple voting systems are employed. Another possible motivation is if the voter does not have significant preference to either party and tactically looks to elect different party members in symbiotic roles to limit the impact of each. One possible example of this is a voter who, in a parallel voting system selects a candidate from a minority party for seats allocated by a proportional representation election system and selects a candidate from a larger party for a seat decided by a first past the post system. In mixed-member proportional systems large-scale strategic split ticket voting and the use of decoy lists may be used to subvert the compensatory effect of the system.

== Split ticket preferences ==
Split ticket voting is different from split ticket preferencing, often referred to as a "split ticket". In the latter, the candidate for political office (or the party they are standing for) will issue 'How to vote' cards or pamphlets which provide two different suggested alternatives on how voters who wish to vote for them should direct their second, third and subsequent preferences.

== See also ==
- Decoy list
- Skirt and blouse voting
- Straight-ticket voting
- Swing vote
- Ticket (election)
