= Politics of British Columbia =

- Coat of arms of British Columbia
- Polity type: Province within a federal parliamentary constitutional monarchy
- Constitution: Constitution of Canada

Legislative branch
- Name: Parliament: Legislative Assembly
- Type: Unicameral
- Meeting place: British Columbia Parliament Buildings, Victoria
- Presiding officer: Speaker of the Legislative Assembly

Executive branch
- Head of state
- Currently: King Charles III represented by Lieutenant Governor Wendy Lisogar-Cocchia
- Head of government
- Currently: Premier; David Eby
- Appointer: Lieutenant governor
- Cabinet
- Name: Executive Council
- Leader: Premier (as president of the Executive Council)
- Appointer: Lieutenant governor
- Headquarters: Victoria

Judicial branch
- Court of Appeal
- Chief judge: Leonard Marchand
- Seat: Vancouver
- Provincial Court
- Chief judge: Ronald A. Skolrood
- Provincial Court
- Chief judge: Melissa Gillespie

The politics of British Columbia involve not only the governance of British Columbia, Canada, and the various political factions that have held or vied for legislative power, but also a number of experiments or attempts at political and electoral reform.

A constitutional monarchy, the Crown is the corporation sole, assuming distinct roles: the executive, as the Crown-in-Council; the legislature, as the Crown-in-Parliament; and the courts, as the Crown-on-the-Bench. Three institutions—the Executive Council (Cabinet); the Legislative Assembly; and the judiciary, respectively—exercise the powers of the Crown.

== Legislature ==
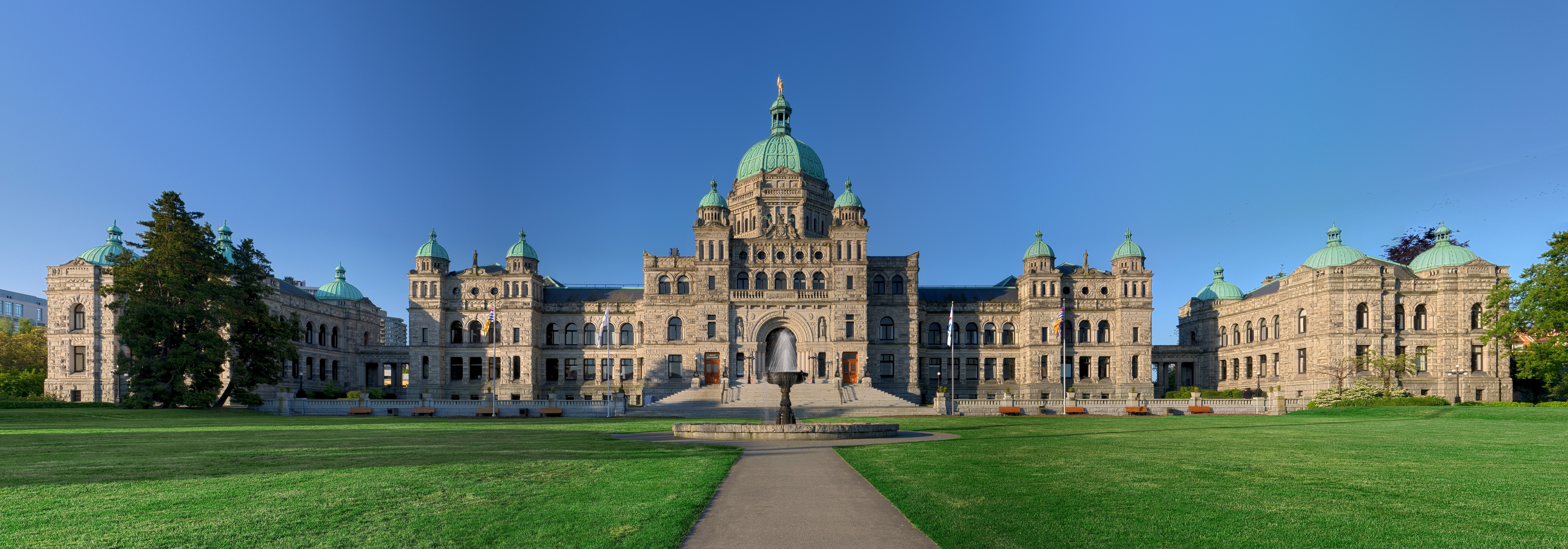
British Columbia Parliament Buildings, the seat of the Legislature

The Parliament of British Columbia consists of the unicameral Legislative Assembly of British Columbia and the Crown in Parliament. As government power is vested in the Crown, the role of the lieutenant governor is to grant royal assent on behalf of the monarch to legislation passed by the Legislature. The Crown does not participate in the legislative process save for signifying approval to a bill passed by the Assembly.

=== Government ===
The Legislature plays a role in the election of governments, as the premier and Cabinet hold office by virtue of commanding the body's confidence. Per the tenants of responsible government, Cabinet ministers are almost always elected MLAs, and account to the Legislative Assembly.

=== Opposition ===
The second-largest party of parliamentary caucus is known as the Official Opposition, who typically appoint MLAs as shadow ministers who critique and scrutinize the work of the government.

The Official Opposition is formally termed His Majesty's Loyal Opposition to signify that, though they may be opposed to the premier and Cabinet of the day's policies, they remain loyal to Canada, which is personified and represented by the King.

== History ==
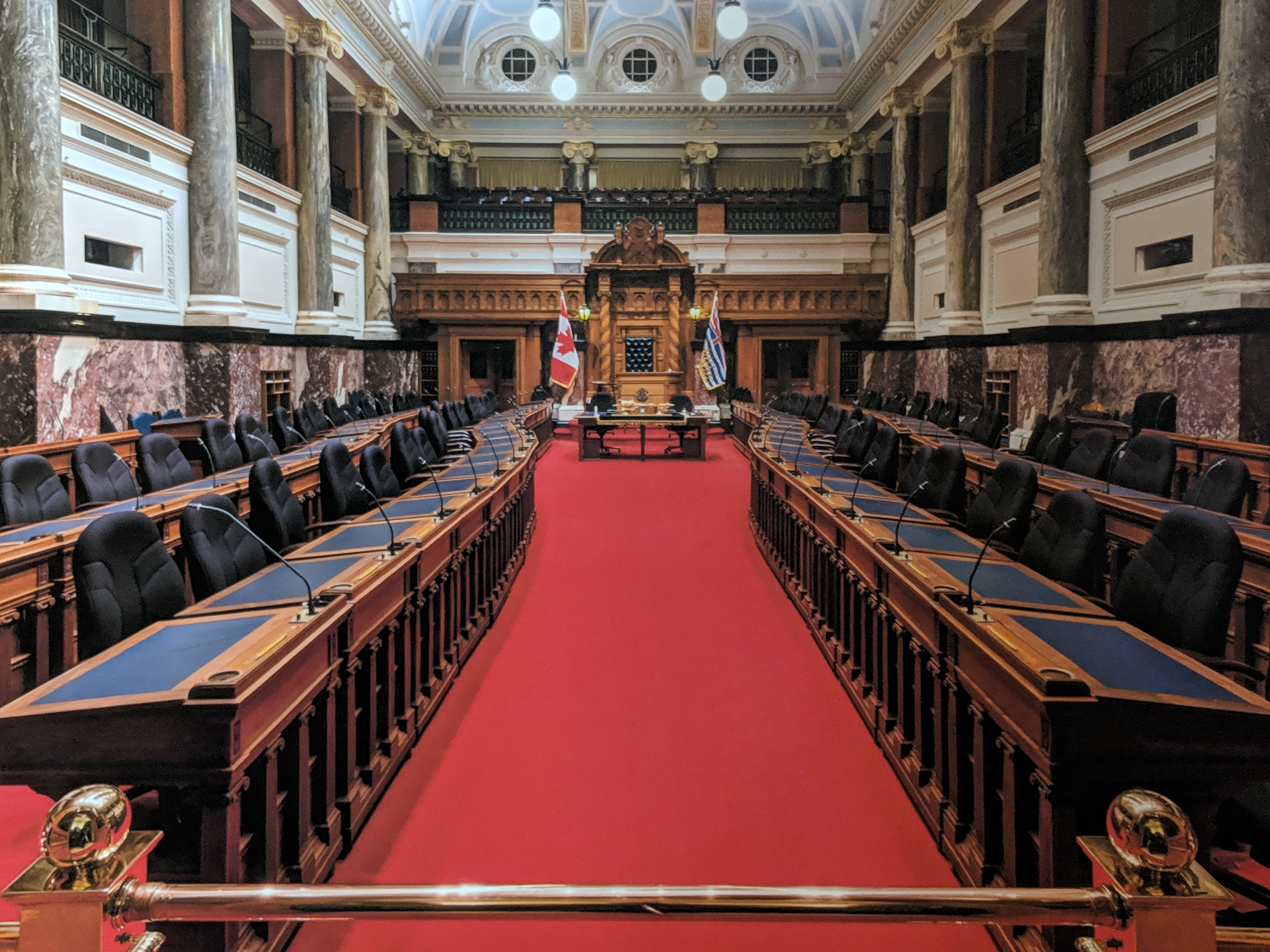
The chamber of the provincial legislature in Victoria

From British Columbia's start as a province, it used a mixture of the first-past-the-post (FPTP) electoral system in single-member districts and multi-member districts where voters cast multiple votes (plurality block voting). This was in use until 1990 (except for a small break in the 1950s when instant-runoff voting for each seat was used). In 1990, single-member districts were instituted across the province. After that, three referendums on electoral reform and adoption of proportional representation have been held, with the most recent in 2018. Despite a majority having voting in favour of change in 2005 (though failing to meet a self-assigned 60% threshold in each electoral district), the province continued to use FPTP. Subsequent referendums in 2009 and 2018 resulted in majorities opposed to changing the existing voting system.

Prior to the 1903 British Columbia general election, provincial politics were non-partisan. One exception to this was the Nationalist Party, BC's first labour party founded in 1894. It elected an MLA in the 1894 and 1898 provincial election – Robert Macpherson.

The first partisan government of BC was that of Richard McBride's Conservative Party. The Liberal Party would serve as the Opposition until 1916, when Harlan Carey Brewster became the first non-Conservative premier of the province.

During the 1940s, the Assembly was dominated by a coalition of Liberals and Conservatives. Neither party had enough seats to form a majority, so they formed a coalition to hold majority power and prevent the BC Co-operative Commonwealth Federation (CCF) (the forerunner of the BC NDP) from taking power. During this time, BC politics were dominated by the three parties. This situation continued until 1952, when the Social Credit ("Socred") government of W.A.C. Bennett was elected. It stayed in power until 1972, when the BC NDP were elected to their first government under Dave Barrett. During this period, Socreds and the BCNDP became the dominant forces in the Legislative Assembly, with Conservatives and Liberals entering the political wilderness. Socreds returned to government in 1975 under Bill Bennett before being routed by Mike Harcourt's BC NDP in 1991. The second run of the BC NDP was chaotic, with the party suffering a landslide defeat by a rejuvenated BC Liberal Party under Gordon Campbell in 2001. The BC Liberal Party is neutral federally and derives its membership from the centre to the centre right, and describes itself as a "free enterprise coalition". Gordon Wilson led the party from effective oblivion to Official Opposition status in the 1991 general election; some consider it to be effectively a rebirth of the defunct Socreds.

In 2017, Liberals under Premier Christy Clark took the most seats and formed a minority government, but they were soon replaced by the BC NDP who had signed a confidence-and-supply deal with the BC Green Party. In 2020, Premier John Horgan was the first leader in the history of the BC NDP to win a second consecutive term as premier.

After the Liberals' defeat in 2020, the party renamed itself to BC United. Between 2020 and 2024, the popularity of the BC United dropped in the opinion polls, while a rejuvenated BC Conservative Party led by John Rustad placed second in popularity after the BC NDP. Before the 2024 election, BC United withdrew from the campaign, and in the election the Conservatives narrowly lost to the BC NDP under Premier David Eby but took enough seats to form the Opposition. Despite the snap election being called amid a leadership crisis and infighting within the Conservative Party, Eby was defeated in the 2026 election, with Lorne Doerkson becoming Premier despite interim leader status.

Throughout BC political history, several third parties have emerged. They include: the BC Greens, BC Socialists, Labour Party, the Provincial Party of British Columbia, and the Progressive Democratic Alliance. Socred Premier Rita Johnston was the first female first minister in Canadian history, and Ujjal Dosanjh of the BC NDP was the first visible minority Premier in BC history.

BC also has municipal political parties. Almost all municipalities in British Columbia use "at-large" districting, rather than wards.

=== Conservative–Liberal era (1903–1952) ===
Elections to the Legislative Assembly of British Columbia (1903–1949) – seats won by party (An italicized number indicates a minority government.)
Government	Conservative				Liberal			Conservative	Liberal			Coalition	
Party	1903	1907	1909	1912	1916	1920	1924	1928	1933	1937	1941	1945	1949
Conservative	22	26	38	39	9	15	17	35		8	12		
Liberal	17	13	2		36	25	23	12	34	31	21		
Liberal-Conservative coalition												37	39
Cooperative Commonwealth Federation									7	7	14	10	7
Socialist	2	3	2	1									
Labour	1					3	3	1	1	1	1	1	1
Provincial Party							3						
Non-Partisan Independent Group									2				
Unionist									1				
Social Democratic				1									
People's Party						1							
Independent Conservative				1									
Independent Liberal							2						
Independent Socialist					1								
Independent					1	3			2	1			1
Total	42	42	42	42	47	47	48	48	47	48	48	48	48

=== Social Credit era (1952–1991) ===
Elections to the Legislative Assembly of British Columbia (1952–1986) – seats won by party (An italicized number indicates a minority government.)
Government	Social Credit							NDP	Social Credit			
Party	1952	1953	1956	1960	1963	1966	1969	1972	1975	1979	1983	1986
Social Credit	19	28	39	32	33	33	38	10	35	31	35	47
Cooperative Commonwealth Federation	18	14	10	16								
New Democratic					14	16	12	38	18	26	22	22
Liberal	6	4	2	4	5	7	5	5	1			
Progressive Conservative	4	1						2	1			
Labour	1	1	1									
Independent												
Total	48	48	52	52	52	55	55	55	55	57	57	69

=== Liberal–NDP era (1991–2024) ===
Elections to the Legislative Assembly of British Columbia (1991–2020) – seats won by party (An italicized number indicates a minority government.)
Government	NDP		Liberal				NDP	
Party	1991	1996	2001	2005	2009	2013	2017	2020
Liberal	17	33	77	46	49	49	43	28
New Democratic	51	39	2	33	35	34	41	57
Green						1	3	2
Social Credit	7							
Reform		2						
Progressive Democratic Alliance		1						
Independent					1	1		
Total	75	75	79	79	85	85	87	87

=== Conservative–NDP era (2024–present) ===
Elections to the Legislative Assembly of British Columbia (2024–present) – seats won by party
Government	NDP	Conservative
Party	2024	2026
New Democratic	47	26
Conservative	44	61
Green	2	2

== Electoral reform ==
=== Recall and initiative ===
British Columbia adopted recall-election and initiative legislation in the 1990s. These measures applied following the 1991 referendum.

Only one recall petition was ever successful: that compelling MLA Paul Reitsma to resign his seat in 1998 – hours before he would have been removed from office.

=== Fixed election dates ===
British Columbia was the first province in Canada to institute fixed election dates. In 2001 four year terms were institutionalized although exceptions are allowed. Previously, British Columbia elections were like most parliamentary jurisdictions, which only require an election within a specified period of time (being five years in all jurisdictions of Canada). Later, elections were changed from a spring date to an autumn date.

=== Alternative voting systems ===
==== 1870 to 1990 ====
From its start as a province, British Columbia used a mixture of single-member districts and multi-member districts. The SMDs used first-past-the post voting to decide the winner in each district; the multi-member districts used plurality block voting to decide the winners. This mixture of multiple-member districts using plurality block voting election system and single-member districts using the first-past-the-post election system was abolished before the 1952 election.

In 1951, the Liberal-Conservative coalition governing BC was falling apart. One of the last acts of the coalition government was to adopt the instant-runoff election system, which was implemented for the 1952 general election.

To make the instant-runoff voting system work, single-member contests were used for each seat (even in multi-seat districts). Preferential ballots were used -- rather than marking just one vote for one candidate by marking an X on their ballot, as was done under first past the post, under IRV an elector marked their choices of candidates by placing numbers next to the names of the candidates on the ballot. (However the vote used to help elect just one candidate, at most.) If a candidate received a majority of votes in the first count, that candidate was elected. If not, the candidate with the fewest votes was dropped and the second choice marked on each ballot held by that candidate was used to transfer the vote to one of the remaining candidates. This procedure was repeated until a candidate received a majority of votes, or the majority of votes still in play.

The coalition suffered a defeat due to receiving relatively few votes. Enough members of the Social Credit party were elected to form a Socred minority government, with the CCF forming the official opposition. The Liberals were reduced to four members in the Legislature. The Conservatives (who had changed their name to “Progressive Conservative” in tandem with their federal counterparts) elected only three.

The Socred minority government lasted only nine months. The IRV election system was again employed for the ensuing general election. The result this time was a Socred majority. During this term of office, the Socreds abolished the alternative voting system and returned the province to the traditional election system that used both single-member districts where first-past-the-post was used, and multi-member districts where the plurality block voting election system was used.

This mixture of multiple-member districts using plurality block voting election system and single-member districts using the first-past-the-post election system was abolished before the 1991 election, bringing single-member districts and FPTP into use universally.

==== 2000s ====
In 2004, a Citizens' Assembly recommended replacing the first-past-the-post system with the single transferable vote election system, to be implemented in 2009. A referendum was held on May 17, 2005, in conjunction with that year's general election to determine if voters approved of this change. Change received majority support (57% of the popular votes cast), but the government said it required passage by 60% of votes cast to make the proposal binding. A second requirement was a majority of votes in 60% of the districts and 77 of the 79 districts achieved this, far more than the 48 minimum. The close result provoked further interest in electoral reform, and the provincial government promised a second referendum on the issue. The second referendum was held in conjunction with the 2009 general election but in that vote change garnered just over 39% of voter support, much less than the required majority.

===== 2010s =====
In 2017 election, the BC NDP campaigned on the promise to hold a referendum on switching to an electoral system of proportional representation. In 2018, a referendum was held with two questions on the ballot. The first question was a binary choice of maintaining the existing first-past-the-post electoral system or moving to a proportional representation electoral system. The second question asked citizens to rank three specific types of proportional representation: dual-member proportional representation, mixed-member proportional representation, and rural–urban proportional representation. If a majority of citizens preferred proportional representation over first-past-the-post, this second question would determine which specific type of proportional representation the province would adopt.

When the votes in the first question were counted, most votes showed a preference for the first-past-the-post system (61.3%) over proportional representation (38.7%), making the second question moot.

Critics suggested that a major reason that proportional representation was defeated was the complexity of the second ballot question. Although much of the general public understood the difference between first-past-the-post and proportional representation, the subtle and numerous differences between dual-member proportional representation, mixed-member proportional representation, and rural–urban proportional representation (with its mixture of MMP and STV) were less easy to understand, possibly motivating many voters to vote to retain the existing electoral system.

== See also ==
- Outline of government and politics of British Columbia
- Executive Council of British Columbia
- Legislative Assembly of British Columbia
- List of political parties in British Columbia
- List of British Columbia general elections
- List of premiers of British Columbia
- Council of the Federation
- Politics of Canada
- Political culture of Canada
