= 2007 Ontario electoral reform referendum =

Canadian provincial referendum on establishing mixed member proportional representation

Referendum on Electoral Reform
- October 10, 2007
- Which electoral system should Ontario use to elect members to the provincial legislature? FR: Quel système électoral l'Ontario devrait-il utiliser pour élire les députés provinciaux à l'Assemblée législative?
- Website: Publications, Elections ON

Results
Choice	Votes	%
Mixed-Member Proportional Representation (MMP)	1,581,741	36.82%
First-Past-The-Post (FPTP)	2,714,020	63.18%
Valid votes	4,295,761	96.36%
Invalid or blank votes	162,068	3.64%
Total votes	4,457,829	100.00%
Registered voters/turnout	8,557,653	52.09%
- Results by riding

A referendum was held on October 10, 2007, on the question of whether to establish a mixed member proportional representation (MMP) system for elections to the Legislative Assembly of Ontario. The vote was strongly in favour of the existing plurality voting or first-past-the-post (FPTP) system.

As of 2026, this is the most recent referendum in Ontario.

== Background ==
Currently, Ontario elects Members of Provincial Parliament (MPPs) using the single member plurality, or first-past-the-post (FPTP), system. In this system, each voter gives one vote to a candidate in an electoral district; the candidate with the most votes wins. In most cases, the party with the most elected candidates is asked to form a government.

The initiative to reform this system was first proposed in 2001 by the Liberal Party opposition leader of the time, Dalton McGuinty. The impetus for the proposal was at least in part the experience of the province with two successive majority governments elected in three consecutive elections with less than 50% of the popular vote, the NDP from 1990-95 under Bob Rae (elected in 1990 with only 38% of the popular vote), and the Conservatives, twice elected with 45% of the vote in 1995 and 1999 under Mike Harris. When the Harris government enacted sweeping changes in public services, a feeling developed that both of these governments lacked a sufficient democratic mandate to justify the extent of such changes. The Liberals won a landslide majority of their own in October 2003, winning 70% of the seats with 45% of the vote.

On November 18, 2004, Premier McGuinty announced that a citizens' assembly would be established to examine the FPTP electoral system and recommend possible changes to be voted upon by referendum in the next provincial election. Enabling legislation to implement these measures —the Election Amendment Act, 2005— received Royal Assent on June 13, 2005. It included provisions for Elections Ontario to select volunteers for a Citizens' Assembly on Electoral Reform. An all-party Committee on Electoral Reform was also created to consider and report on options for electoral reform. Its report was submitted in November 2005. It included a number of recommendations and defined the Citizen's Assembly's mandate.

The Ontario Citizen's Assembly was modeled primarily on the British Columbia Citizens' Assembly on Electoral Reform established as the first of its kind in 2002, leading up to the British Columbia referendum in 2005. It was composed of 103 members, one from each of Ontario's existing ridings, including 51 women, 51 men, and one native member. Its deliberations began in September 2006 and ended with the Assembly's final meeting on April 28, 2007. Proceedings included a learning phase as members learned about the strengths and weaknesses of different electoral systems, a period of public consultations, and a "deliberative" phase during which the Assembly came to a consensus on its recommendations.

== Proposed changes to the electoral system ==
The Citizens' Assembly on Electoral Reform proposed a mixed member proportional representation (MMP) system. Although there exist slightly different variants of MMP, the model proposed for Ontario by the Citizen's Assembly was designed with simplicity and practicality in mind.

=== The general idea ===
As is usually the case in MMP systems, each voter would cast two votes:

- one for a local candidate and
- one for a political party.

The local member would be elected according to the usual FPTP mechanism. These members would represent the electoral district, as in the past.

However, there would also be a number of "list seats". The second ballot would be used to determine what share of total seats (local + list) should be proportionately assigned to each party to ensure proportionality of the overall result.

The proposed Legislature would have 129 seats consisting of 90 local members (70% of the Legislature) and 39 list members (30% of the Legislature). The conventions as to which party is asked to form a government would remain unchanged.

=== The use of party lists ===
List members would be chosen according to a ranked list of candidates proposed by each party before the election. In the Assembly's proposal, there would be only one such list per party for the whole province, as opposed to several regional lists, and it could include candidates also running for office locally. If a candidate for a list member seat had already been elected locally by the time that list seats were being allocated, that candidate's name would simply be passed over in favour of the next candidate on that party list.

=== The largest remainder issue ===
The number of seats won by a party would be calculated by multiplying a party's share of the party vote by the total number of seats in the province. As this multiplication would not automatically yield a round number, the fractional part would be allocated in favour of the party or parties with the largest fractions.

For example, if there were four parties with party votes yielding 45.43, 31.54, 24.76 and 5.27 seats respectively for a total of 107, the initial allocation without the fractions would be 45, 31, 24 and 5, for a total of 105 seats so far. This would leave two seats to be allocated on the basis of fractions; in this example, these seats would go to the second and third parties. The final tally of seats would thus be 45, 32, 25 and 5.

This approach to allocating the fractional seats is called the largest remainder method. The result is as close to proportionality as possible using a simple method given the need to allocate the fractional seats in some way. However it is not necessarily as close as that from the more complex Sainte-Lague method used for New Zealand's MMP system, given that unlike the latter formula the largest remainder method may result in the so-called Apportionment paradox in allocating seats.

=== The Allocation of list members seats ===
Since the number of local seats is established by the election results at the local level, what remains to be done is to fill in the difference with the required number of list member seats for each party. In the above example, if the first party had won 39 local seats, they would now be allocated 6 more seats from the list, for a total of 45 as determined by their share of the party vote.

=== No leveling seats for overhang ===
A particular situation that could arise, though rarely, is that a party might win more local seats than it would normally be allowed in total based on its share of the party vote. This excess of seats is called an "overhang" and in some systems, a form of compensation is made for this by adding "leveling seats" to the other parties. The Assembly did not allow for leveling seats, accepting instead that the system would be slightly less proportional in such cases (see the article "Overhang seat", section "Dealing with overhang seats" for the alternative method that was proposed).

== Referendum question and threshold ==
On June 20, 2007, the Ontario Democratic Renewal Secretariat announced that cabinet had decided on the following wording of the referendum question:

Which electoral system should Ontario use to elect members to the provincial legislature? / Quel système électoral l'Ontario devrait-il utiliser pour élire les députés provinciaux à l'Assemblée législative?

- The existing electoral system (First-Past-the-Post) / L'actuel système électoral (système de la majorité relative)
- The alternative electoral system proposed by the Citizens' Assembly (Mixed Member Proportional) / L'autre système électoral proposé par l'Assemblée des citoyens (système de représentation proportionnelle mixte)

This approach to wording the question was subtly more neutral than that adopted in the 2005 referendum in British Columbia in two ways:

- it gave equal billing to the existing FPTP system rather than asking if voters were for or against the proposed reform using a Yes / No format; and
- it used the word "proposed" rather than "recommended".

To pass, the alternative system required 60% support across the board, and at least 50% support in 64 of the 107 (60% of total) ridings. If successful, the new government would have proposed and passed a new law for MMP by December 31, 2008. and the resolution would have been in effect in any subsequent election.

The referendum was held on October 10, concurrently with the 2007 provincial election, which provided for a separate referendum ballot with the referendum question.

== Elections Ontario education campaign ==
The Ontario Citizens' Assembly recommended that a comprehensive, well-funded public education program, be undertaken to assist voters with their decision, beginning in May 2007 (right after it released its final report) and continuing through to the referendum in October. The Assembly recommended that the education campaign include a description of the new system and how it differs from the current system; a description of the Citizens' Assembly process; and the Assembly's rationale for recommending a Mixed Member Proportional system for Ontario. This would ensure that Ontarians could make an informed decision.

A June Environics poll showed that 70% of those polled were not familiar with the proposal, including over 50% who knew nothing at all about the upcoming referendum.

The McGuinty government decided to mandate Elections Ontario to direct the education campaign, but with the referendum scheduled for October 10, 2007, Elections Ontario didn't formally launch its public education campaign until August of that year. The projected cost for the referendum was $6.825 million, an amount that fell short of the minimum $13 million called for by Fair Vote Canada. The assigned money would give one mailout to each Ontario household, a part-time Referendum Resource Officer in each of the province's ridings, a call centre and a website.

According to LeDuc et al., "Elections Ontario interpreted its information mandate quite narrowly, and did not inform the public of the substance of the proposal or the competing arguments in favour of or against it." Citizens were expected to get the information they needed from various websites or from the press. Remarkably, although the Citizens' Assembly had produced a shorter version of their report and a short leaflet further summarizing it, Elections Ontario distributed neither, to the surprise and disappointment of the Citizens' Assembly. By contrast in British Columbia, the Citizens' Assembly material was distributed to every household.

Similarly, the government made no effort to explain why the Citizens' Assembly had been created, how it had conducted its hearings and deliberations, or why they had made the recommendations upon which voters were expected to pronounce themselves.

The lack of information was such that by late September 2007, public understanding of the question remained very low, with 47% of respondents telling pollster Strategic Counsel they knew nothing at all about the new system, and another 41% saying they knew only "a little". Only 12% said they knew a lot.

== Support and opposition for the proposed reform ==
=== Support ===
The Ontario New Democratic Party supported the referendum, although party leader Howard Hampton criticized the system for giving Northern Ontario a decreased number of ridings. The Green Party of Ontario also lent its support.

As can be seen in the individual endorsements for and against shown below, the Liberals were divided on the issue, with a greater number in support of reform than against it. However, the Premier himself did not take a position on behalf of the government.

Other political parties lending their support to electoral reform included the Family Coalition Party of Ontario and the Communist Party of Ontario.

The proposed system received critical support from Fair Vote Canada, which organized the Vote for MMP campaign, a multi-partisan citizen-based campaign. Vote for MMP had received a long list of public endorsements from all parts of the political spectrum. In addition, over 140 professors of law and politics have endorsed MMP.

The women's group Equal Voice were also critically supportive during Select Committee on Electoral Reform hearings, speaking in support of proportional representation. Equal Voice, with the support of the Doris Anderson Fund has organized the Equal Voice in Politics campaign to support MMP in the referendum.

MMP was endorsed by the Ontario chapter of the Canadian Federation of Students and sixteen other Ontario student unions.

==== Candidates endorsing MMP ====
There does not appear to exist any comprehensive review of the views of 2007 election candidates from each party on the referendum. The following identifies a selection of candidates upon which information could be found.

Although the Ontario Liberal Party had not taken a formal position on MMP, a number of Liberal candidates took a public position in favour of the proposal, including the following.

- Liberal
  - Michael Bryant, St. Paul's
  - Steven H. Fishman, Simcoe—Grey
  - John Gerretsen, Kingston and the Islands
  - Selwyn Hicks, Bruce—Grey—Owen Sound
  - Kate Holloway, Trinity—Spadina
  - Ted McMeekin, Ancaster—Dundas—Flamborough—Westdale
  - Shafiq Qaadri, Etobicoke North
  - Tony Ruprecht, Davenport
  - George Smitherman, Toronto Centre
  - Ian Wilson, Lanark—Frontenac—Lennox and Addington
  - Lorenzo Berardinetti, Scarborough Southwest

NDP and Green candidate support was basically universal, since those parties had taken a party position on the issue. The following provides a sample:

- NDP and Green Party
  - Edelweiss D'Andrea, Ottawa South (NDP)
  - Rick Downes, Kingston and the Islands (NDP)
  - Lyn Hamilton, Ottawa West—Nepean (NDP)
  - John David Ford, Ottawa South (Green)

=== Opposition ===
The Freedom Party of Ontario was the only party that officially opposed the proposed system, claiming that rule by a majority could be anti-democratic and incompatible with the protection of minorities and of individual rights.

Though the PC leader at the time, John Tory, and most PC candidates opposed electoral reform, the party itself did not formally take a position on the issue.

As explained by LeDuc et al., the mainstream print media were "uniformly opposed to both the Assembly process and the MMP proposal". This included the National Post, the Globe and Mail, and the Toronto Star. A content analysis conducted by the authors showed that newspaper coverage was predominantly negative, and that it failed to go beyond the statement of objections to explain the issue to the public.

Organized opposition to the proposal included the No MMP website.

==== Individual candidate opposing the proposed reform ====
The following candidates took a position in favour of the existing FPTP (and against the proposed MMP):

- Liberal:
  - Dwight Duncan, Windsor—Tecumseh
  - Steve Peters, Elgin—Middlesex—London
  - Greg Sorbara, Vaughan—King—Aurora
  - Jim Watson, Ottawa West—Nepean
- Progressive Conservative:
  - Mike Patton, Ottawa West—Nepean
  - Richard Raymond, Ottawa South
  - John Tory, Don Valley West
- Family Coalition:
  - David MacDonald, Ottawa South

=== No official position ===
As already noted, neither the Ontario Liberal Party nor the Progressive Conservative Party of Ontario took an official position on electoral reform. The positions of Liberal candidates on the issue varied, while most PC candidates opposed the initiative.

The Ontario Libertarian Party, Confederation of Regions Party, Republican Party of Ontario, Reform Party of Ontario and Party for People with Special Needs did not officially state a position on electoral reform.

== Results ==
The proposal was defeated, with 36.8% of the valid votes cast supporting MMP, and 63.2% in favour of retaining FPTP.

Option	# of votes in favour	% of votes in favour	# of ridings in favour
First-Past-the-Post	2,714,020	63.2	102
Mixed Member Proportional	1,581,741	36.8	5
Rejected, Unmarked and Declined	162,068		
Total	4,457,829	100.0	107

The result was decisive, with only five constituencies in the Toronto area returning a majority in favour of MMP. Four of these constituencies also elected an NDP candidate.

== Analysis ==
Explanations of the results that have been put forward are of three types: those having to do with the particular model that was put forward; the inadequacy of public education; and the interests of the political elite in favour of the status quo.

Analysis and polling conducted after the referendum identified two features that had not been well received: the proposal to increase the number of members in the legislature to make room for a certain number of list members; and the use of closed lists defined by the parties themselves as a mechanism. Fair Vote Canada points to two features of the MMP model proposed by the Citizen's Assembly that differed from that proposed in 2004 by the Law Commission of Canada in two significant ways:

- the Law Commission had proposed that voters have the ability to vote directly for party candidates in each region —an option that would have addressed voters' concerns about the use of closed lists as proposed by the Citizen's Assembly;
- the Law Commission had proposed that at-large members should be elected at the regional level, rather than province-wide —an option that would have alleviated any possible concerns about MLAs not being "locally anchored and accountable".

Design issues such as these aside, the major factor determining the outcome was widely seen to be the lack of adequate information and understanding of both the proposal itself and the Citizen's Assembly that had given rise to it. In a pre-referendum poll conducted in April 2007 by Stratcom Research, the most commonly cited argument in opposition to the MMP proposal was lack of information about it. For LeDuc et al., a victory for the reform proposal would have been surprising under the circumstances. As they argue based on the evidence of this case and others, "The political advantage in referendum campaigns, particularly those dealing with unfamiliar issues, often seems to rest with the NO side. Those opposed to a proposal do not necessarily have to make a coherent case against it. Often, it is enough merely to raise doubts about it in the minds of voters, question the motives of its advocates, or play upon a natural fear of the unknown."

The authors point to past surveys that tend to show a public that is aware of electoral issues and somewhat positive towards the issue of proportionality but does not have particularly strong views about it. They conclude that "in Canada, and particularly in Ontario, we do not find an underlying climate of opinion that would necessarily facilitate the passage of a reform proposal."

Pilon looks more closely at the role of the print media, which was expected to provide the required space for deliberation about the referendum question. He concludes that Ontario's print media was biased in favour of the No side, offered limited coverage, and was based predominantly on speculative or logical arguments rather than evidence or expert-based ones.

Arguments such as the above suggest the need for political leadership if a referendum such as this is to succeed. This leads analysts, such as LeDuc et al. to look to the ambivalence or hostility on the part of the political elite for an explanation. For them, the lack of information and balanced analysis available to voters was not an accident, but the result of inadequate funding, an excessively limited approach to public education by Elections Ontario, a last-minute approach to informing the public, the lack of attention to the role of the Assembly, and hostility from the media elite.

== See also ==
- Fair Vote Canada
- BC-STV
- 2018 British Columbia electoral reform referendum
