= Dual-member mixed proportional =

Mixed electoral system with compensation

The dual-member mixed proportional (DMP) voting method is a mixed electoral system using a localized list rule to elect two representatives in each district. It is similar to other forms of mixed-member proportional representation, but differs from the additional-member system in that all representatives are elected locally in small districts, rather than requiring separate list seats to be filled in large regional or nationwide districts. In the first step, one seat in each district is awarded to the candidate or party with the most votes, as with first-past-the-post voting rules. In the second step, underrepresented parties are assigned secondary seats in the districts in which they won the most votes, which creates an overall proportional result.

DMP was invented in 2013 by a University of Alberta mathematics student named Sean Graham. The system was intended as a possible replacement for single-member plurality (SMP) in Canadian national and provincial elections. After campaigns to adopt mixed-member proportional representation (MMP) or the single transferable vote (STV) had been defeated in a number of Canadian provinces (see 2005 British Columbia referendum, 2005 Prince Edward Island referendum, 2007 Ontario referendum, 2009 British Columbia referendum), the intent behind DMP was to gain broader acceptance by retaining the key features of SMP. These features include a one-vote ballot, small districts (unlike with STV), and a single tier consisting only of local representatives (in contrast to other MMP proposals).

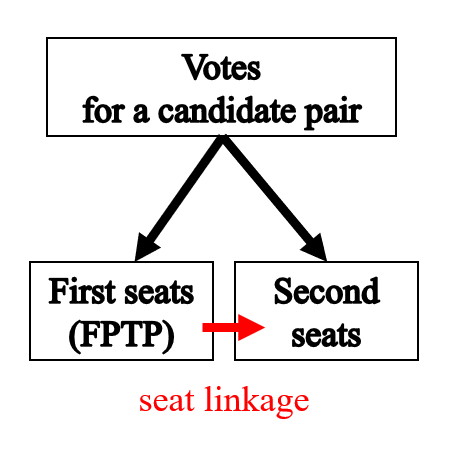
DMP uses one vote, cast for a pair of candidates (or a single candidate), making it a seat linkage MMP system using a mixed single vote. In contrast to other versions of MMP, all seats are assigned in the two-member districts.

== Voting ==
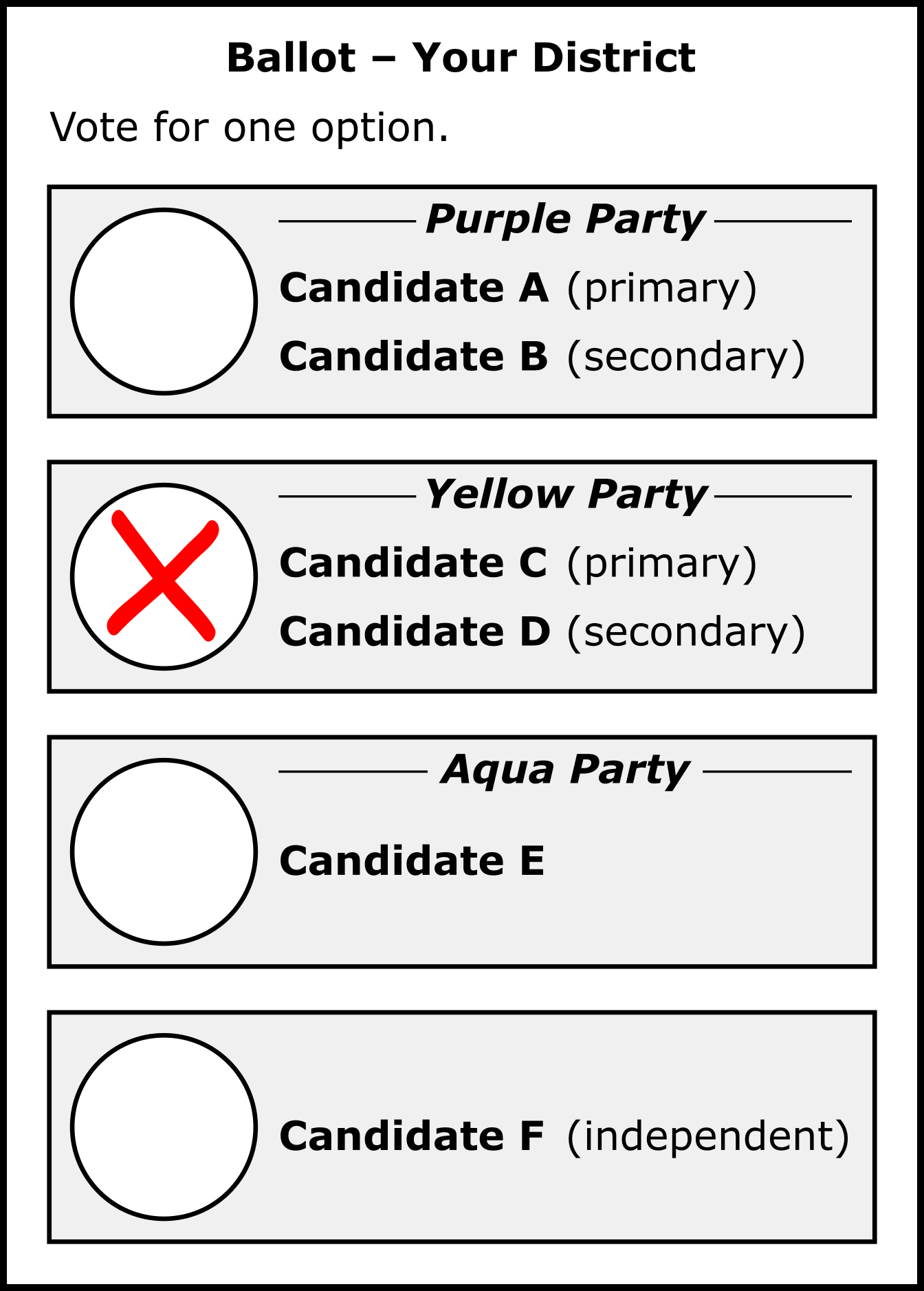
Possible layout of a ballot under DMP

Voting under DMP is similar to the standard first-past-the-post voting. Each voter is given a ballot, where they mark their preferred candidate or pair of candidates. This is called a mixed single vote because voters cast a single vote to indicate both their preferred (local) candidate and their preferred party; vote totals for each party are determined by adding up votes for all candidates of that party. Independents can run as in a normal election, with an independent winning if they have the most votes in a given district.

=== Step 1: Allocate seats to parties ===
Each party is allocated a certain number of seats in proportion to their share of the popular vote in the region. The report on DMP suggests Hamilton's method for apportionment. (Note: When using a largest remainders method like Hamilton's method, it is important to specify if votes for independents are included in the calculation because of the new states paradox. The official proposal suggests excluding independents' vote totals.) The number of seats allocated must be adjusted if independents are elected (as this takes seats away from the parties), or if a party wins more than its proportional share of the seats based on plurality (see step 2).

=== Step 2: Award seats based on plurality, and transfer votes ===
At least half the seats in the region are awarded based on plurality, going to the candidate or party with the most votes.

If the winning primary candidate is from a party that has also listed a secondary candidate on the ballot, then the votes are transferred at half weight to the secondary candidate. For example, if a party has won a district with 48% of the votes, their primary candidate is elected and the secondary candidate is treated as having a 24% vote share. After the vote transfer, if the remaining candidate with the highest vote share in any district is an independent, he or she is elected. All other independent candidates are eliminated.

=== Step 3: Award remaining allocated seats ===
At this point, most (if not all) districts in the region will have one unassigned seat. Each of these unfilled seats must be awarded to one of the remaining party-affiliated candidates. Each party's remaining candidates in the region are sorted from most popular to least popular according to the percentage of votes they received in their districts. Seats are then tentatively assigned to the most popular candidates in each party. The number of seats assigned in this manner is the number of seats initially allocated to each party in step 1, minus the seats each party received in step 2.

After the allocated seats are tentatively assigned, it may be necessary to resolve conflicts. A conflict is a situation where more than one candidate has been assigned a district's second seat. In such cases, the candidate with the highest percentage of votes retains his or her assigned seat, while the other candidates are eliminated. If a candidate is eliminated in this fashion, the seat that was tentatively assigned to him or her is reassigned to the party's most popular candidate still awaiting a seat. The reassignment may produce another conflict, which must itself be resolved. The process continues until no conflicts remain. At that point, any candidate with an assigned seat is elected. The order in which conflicts are resolved has no bearing on which candidates ultimately obtain seats.

It is possible for a party to run out of qualified candidates, in which case they may forfeit one or more of their allocated seats. This situation can occur only if the party nominates fewer than two candidates in at least one district, or if one or more of their candidates fails to meet the district threshold. All forfeited seats are re-allocated on a proportional basis by applying the calculation in step 1 to the parties still eligible for seats. These re-allocated seats are then awarded by performing step 3 an extra time.

=== Thresholds ===
The DMP algorithm can be slightly modified to include either a standard (nationwide) electoral threshold or a local threshold, where a party must win a certain number of votes to win. Either one of these modifications breaks the proportionality mechanism of DMP, creates a discontinuity in the results, and wastes votes, as any threshold does (regardless of the proportional representation rule).

== History ==
Proposals to consider DMP were submitted to the Government of Canada, Alberta, Prince Edward Island (PEI), and British Columbia (BC). In April 2016, the PEI Special Committee on Democratic Renewal officially recommended that DMP appear as one of five options on the 2016 PEI plebiscite, with the winning voting system determined by instant-runoff voting. The plebiscite took place from October 29 to November 7, 2016. DMP was eliminated in the third round, and after its votes were redistributed, MMP was declared the winner (ahead of FPTP). The referendum was non-binding and the government of the time ignored the result. In May 2018, DMP was one of three proportional systems selected to appear on the 2018 BC referendum. The referendum involved a two-question mail-in ballot to be returned by the extended deadline of December 7, 2018. On the first question, a 61% majority of voters chose to retain the current FPTP voting system instead of switching to proportional representation. On the second question, which would have decided the specific proportional system, MMP enjoyed the most support, with DMP collecting slightly more first-choice preferences than rural–urban proportional representation.

== Comparison with additional-member system ==
Dual-member mixed proportional is a variant of mixed-member proportional representation. One set of seats is awarded based on plurality, while the remaining seats are allocated to underrepresented parties in a compensatory manner. From a mathematical standpoint, the compensatory seats in any MMP are analogous to the second district seats in DMP. Both DMP and conventional MMP can be considered mixed electoral systems, meaning that two types of calculation methods are combined. Both are seat linkage compensatory systems (as opposed to vote linkage systems).

Of the various forms of MMP, DMP has most in common with the "best near-winner" system (second mandate, Zweitmandat) used in the German state of Baden-Württemberg. Whereas most implementations of MMP provide electors with two votes, both DMP and the Baden-Württemberg system employ a one-vote ballot. The number of votes candidates receive determines their eligibility for both the first set of seats (based on plurality) and the second set of seats (based in part on the popular vote).

Although MMP and DMP are both mixed systems, the main difference is that the original MMP features two tiers of representatives whereas DMP has only a single tier. Under conventional MMP, the first set of elected candidates serve a district whereas the other representatives serve the entire region. Under DMP, every elected candidate serves the district that they contested. Thus while the DMP calculation is comparable to that of conventional MMP, the resulting form of governance is similar to that of the single transferable vote and other systems based on multi-seat districts.

- DMP is designed to produce a more geographically balanced representation of the electorate, operating with the granularity of equal-sized dual-member districts. Compared to top-up MMP, DMP reduces the likelihood that a disproportionate number of elected representatives will share an association with a particular (local) district.
- DMP allows any seat to be obtained by an independent candidate (under top-up MMP – even the best near winner system – compensatory seats are filled by party lists). Although party-affiliated candidates benefit from the possibility of being elected despite a third- or fourth-place finish, independents have a compensating advantage in that they alone secure a seat by placing second.
- DMP prevents a major party from essentially guaranteeing the election of particular candidates by placing them near the top of a party list. This issue is also addressed by open-list MMP, a variant used in Bavaria where electors vote for individual list candidates.
- DMP avoids certain forms of tactical voting associated with MMP. Under two-vote MMP, an elector may give the first vote to his or her second- or third-favourite candidate if the favourite candidate has little chance of winning the district seat (as typical in first-past-the-post voting). Under DMP, there is less incentive to do this as there is no second vote; the same vote will be used to determine compensatory seats. Also, an elector may give the second vote to a second- or third-favourite party if his or her favourite party is expected to win so many districts seats that they become ineligible for compensatory seats (referred to as split-ticket voting). The Zweitmandat variant of MMP used in Baden-Württemberg also addresses these tactics.
- Regional or national top-up MMP can accommodate somewhat smaller districts than DMP, since without the restriction of all districts being represented by two representatives, it is possible to award fewer than half the seats in a compensatory manner.
- Some forms of MMP can give voters more options. For instance, in a two-vote open-list system such as the one used in Bavaria, voters choose both a local and a regional candidate; for the regional candidate, they have many options within each party. In DMP, by contrast, voters have only one option: a closed local list.
- Both open-list MMP and best near-winner MMP award compensatory seats strictly to the most popular remaining candidates of each party. Under DMP, one or more of a party's most popular candidates might be denied seats if they place third or lower at the district level. If this occurs for all of a small party's candidates who placed above the district threshold, that party will forfeit one or more seats.
- Under two-tier MMP variants, a province large enough to have regions within the province, every voter for a party winning enough votes to elect a regional MP will have, rather than only two MPs, an MP from their party elected by voters in that region, accountable to that region. And in smaller provinces, every voter for a party winning enough votes will have an MP from their party elected by voters in that province, accountable to that province.

== Comparison with other methods ==
One main feature of DMP is that it is designed to have districts of equal size and at the same time achieve proportional representation not within districts but over all seats. This makes it related to the concept of biproportional apportionment, which uses a unified algorithm for determining how many seats represent each region and to achieve party proportionality on the whole based on the votes cast. However, DMP is a mixed system and does not apportion seats between districts based on votes (under biproportional apportionment, each region's share of seats is proportional to its total votes).

Dual-member mixed proportional is not to be confused with the "proportional" system using dual-member districts known as the binomial system, which divides seats "proportionally" in two-member districts. Another difference is that the binomial system uses open lists, while proposals for DMP in Canada have suggested using a closed list system.

The system shares some similarities with Anton Buhagiar's proposed "priority queue" for STV in Malta (1995), and Rod Stringer's proposed version of PR-squared for Westminster elections (2010, 2023).

== See also ==
- Sekihairitsu
- List of electoral systems by country
