= Citizens' Assembly on Electoral Reform =

Citizens' Assembly on Electoral Reform may refer to:

- Citizens' Assembly on Electoral Reform (British Columbia)
- Citizens' Assembly on Electoral Reform (Ontario)
