= Citizens' Reference Panel =

A Citizens' Reference Panel is a non-compulsory public jury used in Canada to provide policy advice to public and elected officials. They are generally convened by the government or a public agency and typically meet several times over a period of weeks or months to learn about, discuss, and reach agreement on recommendations for how to address a contentious public issue.

== Overview ==
Citizens' Reference Panels will have anywhere from 24 to 54 citizens members, with equal numbers of men and women, while matching the age profile and geographic distribution of the population in the region or jurisdiction they represent.

Members of a Citizens' Reference Panel are randomly invited and selected during a civic lottery process. They are considered volunteers and with the exception of reimbursements for travel and childcare, they receive no financial compensation for their time. The idea being that the time each citizen volunteers to the panel is part of a public service, such as jury duty.

Much like a Royal Commission, the recommendations of a Citizens' Reference Panel are non-binding though they do carry moral stature.

Citizens' Reference Panels developed as an offshoot of the Citizens' Assembly on Electoral Reform in British Columbia in 2004 and in Ontario in 2006. As of 2016, MASS LBP reports having completed 25 Citizens' Reference Panels in Canada.

== See also ==
- Citizens' assembly
- Deliberative democracy
- Democracy
- Direct democracy
- Sortition
