= 2018 British Columbia electoral reform referendum =

Referendum on British Columbia's voting system

- October 22 – December 7, 2018
- Which system should British Columbia use for provincial elections?
- Outcome: The current first past the post voting system

Results
Choice	Votes	%
A proportional representation voting system	533,518	38.70%
The current first past the post voting system	845,235	61.30%
Valid votes	1,378,753	99.09%
Invalid or blank votes	12,670	0.91%
Total votes	1,391,423	100.00%
Registered voters/turnout	3,297,396	42.2%
Question 1 results by electoral district
First past the post	Proportional representation

A referendum on electoral reform took place by mail-in ballot between October 22 and December 7, 2018, in the Canadian province of British Columbia. 61.3% of voters supported maintaining the first-past-the-post voting system rather than switching to a proportional representation voting system, which was supported by 38.7% of voters. This was British Columbia's third referendum on electoral reform, following ones in 2005 and 2009.

Voters were asked two questions: first, what electoral system should be used to determine election results—the existing first-past-the-post (FPTP) system or a proportional representation (PR) system; and second, what type of proportional voting system should be used if PR were chosen. In the second question, voters were asked to rank three proportional representation voting systems: dual-member proportional representation, mixed-member proportional representation, and rural–urban proportional representation.

The referendum fulfilled an election commitment by the British Columbia New Democratic Party (NDP) during the 2017 election. Their platform promised a referendum and that the government would actively campaign for electoral reform. Results were released by Elections BC on December 20, 2018.

== Background ==
BC has a long history of changing its electoral system. For BC's first election in 1871, the majority of ridings were elected using an "at large" system (multi-seat districts using plurality block voting). This is the way city councillors are elected in BC to this day: a voter gets as many votes as there are seats to be filled in the riding. Outside the multi-seat districts, seats were filled through first-past-the-post voting.

Over its history, BC modified its electoral system at least 15 times without a referendum. These reforms usually changed the number of seats or districts, but there have been changes to the voting system used as well. From the start, BC used a mixed system of block voting and FPTP, then it used the alternative voting system (in both single- and multi-seat districts) in the 1952 provincial election, then it reestablished the previous mix of "at-large" (block voting) and first-past-the-post voting. FPTP was brought into use across the province in 1991, after the last "at-large" (multi-member) voting districts were abolished following a Supreme Court of British Columbia decision in Dixon v. British Columbia (Attorney General) ruled the existing dual-member districts violated the principle of "one person, one vote"; a subsequent government commission, the Fisher Commission, recommended the abolition of all of the province's dual-member districts.

=== Previous referendums ===
Before the 2001 provincial election, the BC Liberal Party committed to appoint a Citizens' Assembly to investigate electoral reform, hold consultations, and prepare a report recommending whether a different electoral system should be adopted. The commitment was driven in part by the anomalous provincial election result in 1996, in which the BC New Democratic Party won reelection as a majority government with 39.5% of the vote and 39 seats, despite gaining a 3% smaller share of the popular vote than the Liberals at 41.8%, which translated into 33 Liberal seats. In December 2004, the Assembly released its report recommending that the province adopt BC-STV, a BC-specific variant of the single transferable vote (STV) system. On May 17, 2005, a referendum was held in conjunction with the 2005 general election, in which voters were asked whether the province should adopt the recommendation of the Assembly to replace the first-past-the-post electoral system with BC-STV, or maintain the current system. While 57.7% of the electorate voted in favour of BC-STV, including a majority of voters in 77 of 79 ridings, its support failed to reach the 60% threshold set by the government and it was not adopted.

Following the 2005 referendum, British Columbia held a second referendum on electoral reform in conjunction with the provincial election on May 12, 2009. It was the most recent referendum on electoral reform that has been held in British Columbia. As in 2005, voters in 2009 were asked to provide their opinions on the BC-STV electoral system proposed by the British Columbia Citizen's Assembly on Electoral Reform to ensure more proportional representation in the provincial Legislative Assembly. British Columbians were asked which electoral system should be used to elect legislators: the existing first-past-the-post electoral system or the proposed BC-STV system.

The adoption of BC-STV in the 2009 referendum was defeated, with 60.9% voting against the reform and 39.09% of voters supporting the change.

=== Intervening federal developments ===
During the 2015 federal election, Justin Trudeau and the Liberal Party of Canada campaigned on the promise that it would be the last federal election under the first-past-the-post electoral system. The party's platform stated that a Liberal government would form an all-party Parliamentary committee, and introduce legislation within 18 months enacting electoral reform. On December 1, 2016, the House of Commons of Canada Special Committee on Electoral Reform released its report recommending Canada hold a referendum to adopt a proportional representation voting system for federal elections. Several months later, the government announced that it was no longer pursuing electoral reform.

=== Origin of third referendum ===
During the 2017 provincial election, both the NDP and the Green Party campaigned for PR and included the policy in their election platforms. On May 29, 2017, approximately three weeks after the election resulted in a BC Liberal minority government, the NDP and Green caucuses signed a supply and confidence agreement. The agreement included a section on PR, in which the parties agreed to put the issue to a referendum and that both parties would actively campaign for PR in the referendum. On June 22, 2017, the Liberal government tabled its throne speech, adopting the opposition parties' policy to hold a third referendum on electoral reform. On June 29, 2017, the BC Liberal government was defeated in a confidence vote. Lieutenant Governor Judith Guichon then invited the NDP to form a minority government with Green support. On November 30, 2017, the Electoral Reform Referendum 2018 Act was passed into law. It required the referendum to be held and authorized Cabinet to make various regulations.

== Consultation and implementation ==
Between November 2017 and February 2018, Attorney General David Eby conducted a public consultation entitled "How We Vote". On May 30, 2018, he released the report on the consultation and recommendations concerning how the referendum process should be conducted. Cabinet accepted the recommendations shortly thereafter, in early June. Later in June, Vote PR BC launched their campaign for proportional representation, canvassing in cities across the province.

Elections BC reviewed the referendum questions in June. On June 18, Chief Electoral Officer Anton Boegman wrote to the Speaker of the Legislative Assembly advising that in his view both questions were simple and clear enough for voters to understand. He also made recommendations for small changes to the questions. On June 22, 2018, the government released the regulations governing the referendum. The regulations adopted the changes to the question proposed by the Chief Electoral Officer, and set down other rules governing the campaign.

=== ICBA lawsuit ===
On June 28, 2018, the Independent Contractors and Business Association (ICBA)—a lobby group for the construction industry— filed a lawsuit seeking an injunction to stop the referendum, or alternatively, to strike down the campaign financing rules governing the referendum. The lawsuit contains various complaints about the process, the referendum, and the systems on the ballot. In response, NDP MLA Bob D'Eith called the lawsuit an attempt to stop people from having a choice in their electoral system, and said ICBA does not want "ordinary people to have a stronger voice in the elections and I think they're desperate to hang on to the status quo". The Ministry of the Attorney General defended the legislation in court. The official campaign began July 1, 2018.

On July 17, 2018, ICBA's court application for an early trial date was dismissed by Justice Miriam Gropper of the British Columbia Supreme Court, in order to allow the government time to respond. Following the hearing, ICBA's lawyer, Peter Gall, told reporters ICBA would be seeking an interim injunction.

On July 24, ICBA filed an application seeking an interim injunction to halt campaign financing rules and prevent ballots from being counted. The application was heard by Justice Gropper on August 7. In her decision handed down several weeks later, she dismissed the application calling ICBA's allegations about the referendum "rhetoric", "conjecture" and "exaggeration". In mid-September, the ICBA announced that they would be seeking leave to appeal Justice Gropper's ruling on the interim injunction. That same month, the British Columbia Government and Service Employees' Union was granted intervenor status by the court, siding against the ICBA.

The appeal of Justice Gropper's judgement concerning the interim injunction was heard on November 2. Justice Fitch of the British Columbia Court of Appeal dismissed the appeal, finding that there was no merit to the ICBA's argument.

== Ballot structure and details ==
Voters were asked two questions in the referendum. The first revolved around what electoral system should be used to determine election results: the existing first-past-the-post system or a proportional representation system. The second question explored what type of proportional voting system should be used if PR is chosen. This involved voters ranking three proportional representation voting systems: dual-member proportional representation, mixed-member proportional representation, and rural–urban proportional representation.

- Question 1: Which system should British Columbia use for provincial elections? (Vote for only one.)
  - The current First Past the Post voting system
  - A proportional representation voting system
- Question 2: If British Columbia adopts a proportional representation voting system, which of the following voting systems do you prefer? (Rank in order of preference. You may choose to support one, two or all three of the systems.)
  - Dual-member proportional (DMP)
  - Mixed-member proportional (MMP)
  - Rural–urban proportional (RUP)

== Proportional voting systems on the ballot ==
The referendum asked voters to rank three proportional representation voting systems in order of preference. Voters ranked one, two, or all three systems. The three systems were:

- Dual-member proportional (DMP)
- Mixed-member proportional (MMP)
- Rural–urban proportional (RUP)

=== Dual-member proportional (DMP) ===
Dual-member proportional is an electoral system designed to produce proportional election results across a region by electing two representatives in each of the region's districts. The first seat in every district is awarded to the candidate who receives the most votes, similar to first-past-the-post voting. The second seat is awarded to one of the remaining district candidates so that proportionality is achieved across the region, using a calculation that aims to award parties their seats in the districts where they had their strongest performances.

DMP was invented in 2013 by a University of Alberta mathematics student named Sean Graham. The system was intended as a possible replacement for first-past-the-post voting in Canadian national and provincial elections. Whereas campaigns to adopt MMP representation or the single transferable vote had recently been defeated in a number of Canadian provinces (such as the 2005 and 2009 British Columbia referendums, the 2005 Prince Edward Island referendum, and the 2007 Ontario referendum), the intent behind DMP was to gain broader acceptance by retaining salient features of first-past-the-post voting. These features include a one-vote ballot, relatively small districts (compared with STV), and a single tier of local representatives (in contrast to MMP).

=== Mixed-member proportional ===
Mixed-member proportional is a mixed electoral system in which voters get two votes: one to decide the representative for their single-seat constituency, and one for a political party. Seats in the legislature are filled firstly by candidates in local ridings, and secondly, by party candidates based on the percentage of nationwide or region-wide votes that each party received.

In 2004, MMP was recommended by the Law Commission of Canada to be adopted for federal elections. In 2007, Ontario held a provincial referendum to adopt the system, which failed to pass. In 2016, Prince Edward Island (PEI) voted to adopt MMP in a non-binding referendum. PEI held another referendum on the issue during the 2019 provincial election and narrowly voted against MMP.

A form of MMP is used for national elections in New Zealand and Germany, and in the United Kingdom for elections to the devolved parliaments of Scotland and Wales (where the system is referred to as the Additional Member System).

=== Rural–urban proportional (RUP) ===
The name rural–urban proportional representation (RUP) was coined by Fair Vote Canada in 2016 as part of an effort to design a made-in-Canada voting system adapted to Canada's geography of wide open spaces. Fair Vote Canada's RUP is based on multi-member districts of variable size, featuring more seats per district in urban areas and fewer seats in rural areas, including some single-member districts in the most sparsely populated areas, hence the rural–urban distinction incorporated in the name.

To ensure a high level of proportionality overall, RUP also allows for a limited number of regional top-up seats. An advantage of this approach, compared to MMP, is that it requires fewer top-up seats to achieve proportionality. Under Fair Vote Canada's RUP, no more than 10% to 15% of seats would need to be set aside as top-up seats to achieve a high level of proportionality, because the results from existing multi-member districts would already be relatively proportional.

In its scorecard of proportional voting systems, Fair Voting BC gave RUP its highest ranking. During the Canadian government's 2016 consultation on electoral reform at the federal level, both the New Democratic Party of Canada and Green Party of Canada recommended Canada adopt either RUP or MMP.

Simplified example of an STV ranked ballot used in an urban or semi-urban area under rural–urban proportional. A ranked ballot lets voters rank individual candidates in order of preference.

Fair Vote Canada's RUP did not specify whether the single transferable vote (STV) approach would be used in multi-member districts but left that as a possibility. The hybrid approach proposed under RUP reflects lessons learned from previous attempts to pass electoral reform. A rural–urban dichotomy of a sort has been tried in Canada before. From the 1920s to the 1950s, the provinces of Alberta and Manitoba used a hybrid rural–urban system where STV was used in large cities Calgary, Edmonton and Winnipeg) and the alternative vote was used in single-member rural districts.

However, the rural–urban option put forward in the BC referendum differed significantly from the rural–urban majoritarian system used in Alberta and Manitoba. What was put forward, instead, was the use of different models altogether in rural and urban areas: mixed-member proportional representation (MMP) in rural areas and STV in urban and semi-urban areas. This would allow rural areas to retain single-member districts using the MMP approach, while allowing for multi-member districts using STV in the rest of the province.

Of the three options put forward by the government, this version of rural–urban was the only one allowing voters to rank individual candidates in order of preference using STV in urban and semi-urban areas. Under STV, all candidates must compete with one another for enough votes to win, including candidates running for the same party. Voters can rank long-shot independent candidates or candidates from unpopular parties first without fear of wasting their vote because votes for badly performing candidates are transferred to another candidate during counting, based on the voter's next preference, until all of the seats have been won.

== Campaign ==
The official campaign began July 1, 2018. Groups had until July 6 to apply to Elections BC to be named the official proponent or opponent groups and receive $500,000 in public funding. On July 12, Elections BC announced that Vote PR BC would be the official proponent group and No BC Proportional Representation Society would be the official opponent group. Other individuals, groups and political parties were permitted to register as referendum advertisers with Elections BC but were not eligible for public funds.

The NDP and Green Party campaigned for proportional representation. Sonia Furstenau, a Green MLA, held town halls about electoral reform in cities across the province in July and August. BC Premier John Horgan launched the NDP's referendum campaign in early September, saying "Proportional representation means exactly what it says. Whatever proportion, or share, of the vote a party wins, they get that many seats in government." Andrew Wilkinson, BC Liberal leader, opposed the referendum and a change to a proportional representation system.

Elections BC mailed a referendum information card to every household in the province between September 10 and 28, and a voter's guide between October 15 and 26. Voters received their referendum voting package in the mail between October 22 and November 2. In early September, the members of the Canadian Union of Postal Workers voted in favour of job action. The strike resulted in Elections BC extending the voting deadline by a week.

In early November, Horgan announced that he had cast his ballot for proportional representation, and that his first choice was MMP. Vote PR BC, the official proponent group, flew Andrew Coyne to Vancouver to give a talk endorsing PR, where Coyne announced he supported Rural–Urban Proportional.

=== Debate ===
In late September, Andrew Wilkinson challenged John Horgan to a debate concerning the referendum, a challenge which Horgan accepted. The debate took place on November 8 at 7:00 pm. It was broadcast on CBC News and Global News.

=== Official campaign organizations ===
Official campaign organizations included the official proponent and opponent groups along with referendum advertising sponsors.

==== Official proponent and opponent groups ====
- Proponent: Vote PR BC
- Opponent: No BC Proportional Representation Society

==== Referendum advertising sponsors ====
- Asian Environmental Association
- British Columbia Conservative Party
- British Columbia Government and Service Employees' Union
- British Columbia Liberal Party
- British Columbia New Democratic Party
- Committee for Voting Equity in BC
- Communist Party of British Columbia
- Dogwood Initiative
- Fair Vote Canada BC
- Fraser Valley East Against Proportional Representation
- Green Party Political Association of British Columbia
- KnowB4UVote.com Society
- LeadNow
- No Pro Rep Fraser Valley East
- Rural–Urban Proportional for BC
- Wake Up BC
- Wildsight
- Wise Vote BC
- YES or NO, Rural Urban First

== Voting period extension ==
On November 23, 2018, due to a postal strike, Elections BC extended the voting period mailing deadline by a week – from November 30, 2018, to December 7, 2018. The deadline to register to vote remained midnight on November 23, 2018. Voters who were sent a voting package but did not receive it, or who need a replacement voting package, could request a replacement package up to December 7. All ballots must have been received by Elections BC by 4:30 p.m. on December 7. In response to a question from a constituent on Twitter, Elections BC clarified that ballots received by Elections BC's Referendum Service Offices or Service BC Centres up to and including 4:30 p.m. on December 7, 2018, but which had not been physically transferred to Elections BC's counting centre, would be accepted and counted as valid ballots.

== Post-referendum plans ==
The government had plans for the required next steps had proportional representation passed. However, as it did not pass, the government did not implement any of these. Had a proportional system been adopted, the independent BC Electoral Boundaries Commission would have determined the number and location of new electoral districts. A legislative committee would have been tasked with determining whether the number of members of the Legislative Assembly should increase, and if so by how many (to a maximum of an additional eight). Some other aspects of how the new system would have worked would have also needed to be determined by a legislative committee.

If a form of proportional representation had been adopted, the government had also committed to holding a further confirming referendum after two general elections. Voters in that future referendum would have had the option of maintaining the form of proportional representation adopted or switching back to the first-past-the-post electoral system. On October 2, 2018, the government introduced legislation to enact the requirement for this second referendum into law. If a change from the first-past-the-post system had been adopted in 2018, the bill would have required a second referendum on electoral reform to occur within 13 months of the second provincial general election held under the chosen proportional representation voting system (no later than November 30, 2026). As voters decided to keep the existing first-past-the-post system, this second referendum will not take place.

== Opinion polls ==
=== Question 1 ===
Referendum-style binary question
Question: "Based on what you know, please indicate which of these two broad options you prefer for BC"

Polling firm	Last date of polling	A new system of proportional representation	The current first-past-the-post system	Ref.
Angus Reid	June 20, 2017	59%	41%	
Angus Reid	September 26, 2017	65%	35%	
Angus Reid	December 31, 2017	57%	43%	
Angus Reid	May 9, 2018	57%	43%	
Angus Reid	September 17, 2018	57%	43%	
Mainstreet	November 8, 2018	49.5%	50.5%	

Multiple choice question allowing undecideds and opt-outs (options 3–5 will not be present on ballot)
Question: "Based on how you feel right now, if you were to receive a voting package, which way would you vote on the first question?"

Polling firm	Last date of polling	The current first past the post voting system	A proportional representation voting system	Undecided / Not sure	Would not vote on this particular question	Would ignore the voting package altogether	Ref.
Angus Reid	September 18, 2018	31%	33%	33%	1%	2%	
Google Survey	November 6, 2018	19.7%	19.8%	43.5%	n/a	17.1	

=== Question 2 ===
Polling firm	Last date of polling	Mixed-Member Proportional	Rural–Urban Proportional	Dual Member Proportional	Notes	Ref.
Angus Reid	September 28, 2018	49%	26%	24%	Percentage breakdown shows preference among decided voters; 54% of people polled report being undecided on which system to choose.	
Mainstreet Research	November 8, 2018	44.8%	38.2%	17%	RUP has large lead in interior BC. MMP and RUP tied on Vancouver Island. MMP leading in Metro Vancouver.	

== Results ==
On December 20, 2018, Elections BC announced that 61.3% of ballots were cast to maintain the first-past-the-post voting system.

A total of 1,391,423 ballots were considered. There were 1,378,753 valid votes for Question 1, and 831,760 valid votes for Question 2. 2,461 ballots were rejected.

=== Question 1 ===
The existing first-past-the-post voting system received a majority of votes with 61.30% (845,235) of the valid votes for Question 1. As a result, no electoral reform was approved.

Question 1: Which system should British Columbia use for provincial elections?

System	Votes	%
The current First Past the Post voting system	845,235	61.30%
A proportional representation voting system	533,518	38.70%
Total valid votes	1,378,753	100.0%
Invalid votes	10,209	
Rejected ballots	2,461	
Total ballots	1,391,423	

=== Question 2 ===
Per the Electoral Reform Referendum 2018 Regulation, STV rules were in effect to find the winner in Question 2 (although the question was moot as no electoral reform would take place as per the result of Question 1). Thus, when no system won a majority of first preferences, a second round of counting was required for Question 2. RUP had the fewest first preferences, so it was eliminated and its votes were transferred to the second preferences marked on the ballots. In the second count, the mixed-member proportional voting system had the most support on Question 2.

Question 2: If British Columbia adopts a proportional representation voting system, which of the following voting systems do you prefer?

	Round 1		Round 2		
System	Votes	%	Transfers	Votes	%
Mixed-Member Proportional (MMP)	343,038	41.24%	+148,592	491,630	63.05%
Dual-Member Proportional (DMP)	244,973	29.45%	+43,095	288,068	36.95%
Rural–Urban Proportional (RUP)	243,749	29.31%	−243,749		
Total continuing ballots	831,760	100.00%	−52,062	779,698	100.00%
Exhausted ballots				52,062	
Total valid votes	831,760			831,760	
Invalid votes	557,202			557,202	
Rejected ballots	2,461			2,461	
Total ballots considered	1,391,423			1,391,423	

== Exit poll and statistical analysis ==
An exit poll conducted by ResearchCo provided information on why people voted the way they did. The poll showed that many of those who voted "No" shared democratic values associated with support for proportional representation. According to the poll, majorities of British Columbians polled endorsed:

- being able to vote for one’s choice without worrying about splitting the vote (75%)
- a party not holding majority power only if its candidates won a majority of the votes (70%)
- the voting system not disadvantaging independent candidates (70%)
- a preference for almost all votes helping elect an MLA (64%)
- voters being able to choose among different candidates from their preferred party (58%)
- MLAs being elected from different parties in close proportion to how voters in each region voted (57%)

When presented with a number of potential reasons for having voted "No", respondents identified a range of reasons, including the following top responses:

- MLAs might be appointed from party lists (52%)
- The details of the three options on the second question were not fully fleshed out (52%)
- Fringe or extremist parties could win seats (51%)
- The three options listed on the second question were confusing and not clearly explained (50%)
- Smaller parties could hold the balance of power (49%)

The ResearchCo exit poll indicated that people voted very much along partisan lines. Supporters of the BC Liberals and Conservatives voted for the status quo (87% and 84% respectively), while NDP and Green Party supporters favoured proportional representation (62% and 65% respectively). The turnout was also considerably higher for Liberal party voters (94% vs. 85% for NDP voters). Another group that voted in the majority for proportional representation were young people ages 18 to 35. However, turnout rates in the exit poll sample were lower for this cohort (65% for youth aged 18–24 and 73% for ages 25–34, compared to a high of 92% for those aged 65 and above). Multivariate regression analysis of results by riding identified more detailed results by age and political stance: young Liberals strongly opted for the status quo along with their peers, and young Greens voted strongly for proportional representation; however, among NDP supporters, there was a split, with young people voting more strongly for proportional representation than older groups.

Max Cameron argued in the Vancouver Sun that the referendum was "rushed” and missing a process of "broad public consultations".
