= Rural–urban proportional representation =

Canadian hybrid proportional electoral system

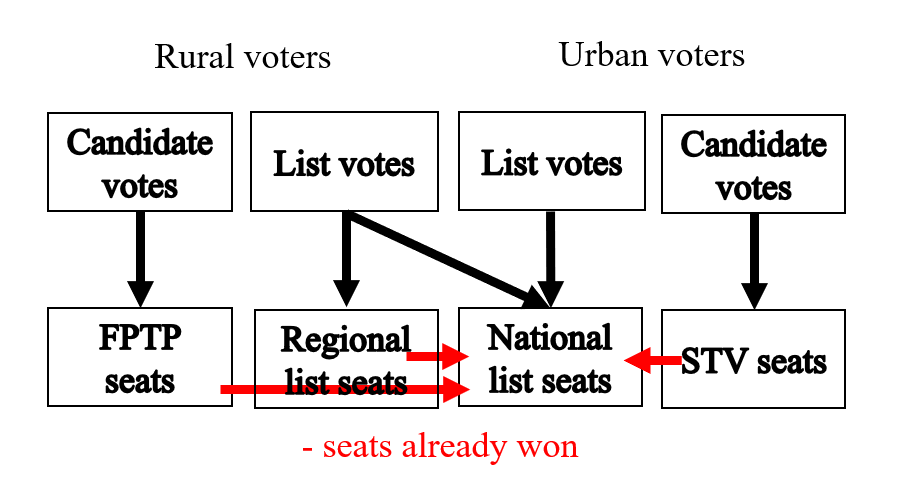
Rural-urban proportional, as proposed by the BC government in 2018, was a combination of STV and MMP systems. In its original formulation by Fair Vote Canada and Fair Voting BC, it was a combination of multi-member districts with a small percentage of regional top-up seats

Example of a ballot under rural–urban proportional for a voter who lives in an urban or semi-urban area with multi-member STV electoral districts

Rural–urban proportional representation (RUP), also called flexible district PR, is a supermixed electoral system which combines the use of single- and multi-member constituencies in a lower tier and top-up seats in an upper tier to meet the different needs of both rural and urban areas, while protecting the objective of proportionality. The term was coined by Fair Vote Canada and Fair Voting BC, which devised a rural–urban system with the intention of meeting the special challenges of Canada's geography, which includes wide-flung, sparsely populated areas.

Rural–urban proportional systems were first devised in Denmark and Iceland; Denmark's implementation used party-list proportional representation in urban areas, and a combination of first-past-the-post voting and regional leveling seats (which functioned similar to a mixed-member proportional system) in semi-urban and rural areas, alongside nationwide levelling seats; while Iceland's used party-list proportional representation in urban and semi-urban areas, pure first-past-the-post voting in rural areas, and nationwide leveling seats.

A version of rural–urban proportional was proposed in 2018 as one of three systems which could have been adopted in British Columbia if voters had decided to adopt a proportional voting system in a 2018 referendum in the province. This version of rural–urban proportional would have used single transferable vote (STV) in urban and semi-urban areas and mixed-member proportional representation (MMP) in rural areas.

Rural–urban proportional is the only proportional voting system proposed in BC's 2018 electoral reform referendum to include an approach previously used in Canada. Alberta and Manitoba used STV in major cities and single-member ridings in rural areas to elect provincial members of the Legislative Assembly (MLAs) for 30 years.

In a country like Canada, which already has some ridings of considerable geographic size, rural–urban proportional allows for the creation of smaller multi-member ridings, or even the retention of some single-member ridings, in rural areas. In more densely populated areas, it gives voters more choice of candidates to choose from and ensures representation by a number of elected representatives from different parties or points of view, including independents. The use of ranked ballot under the single transferable vote allows voters to more fully express their preferences than otherwise.

== Background ==
A rural–urban proportional representation system (though different from the one devised by Fair Vote Canada and Fair Voting BC) was first used in the 1918 Danish Folketing election: in Copenhagen, MPs were elected by proportional representation in a single tier; outside of Copenhagen, most MPs were elected via first-past-the-post voting in single-member constituencies, and there were also 20 regional leveling seats which were intended to make the results more proportional, in addition to three national levelling seats.

Iceland employed a rural–urban proportional system similar to the Danish one between 1946 and June 1959. Under that system, twenty-one members of the Althing were elected in single-member constituencies via first-past-the-post voting, while the remainder were elected using D'Hondt method proportional representation: twelve members in two-member constituencies and eight members in Reykjavík, as well as eleven members elected for nationwide leveling seats.

Fair Vote Canada and Fair Voting BC devised their own rural-urban system in response to a suggestion made by former chief electoral officer Jean-Pierre Kingsley to the House of Commons Special Committee on Electoral Reform on July 7, 2016. Kingsley proposed the idea of having proportional multi-member ridings of 4 to 5 representatives in urban areas while retaining single-member ridings in rural areas.

=== Proposed usage in Canada ===
The original Canadian version of rural–urban proportional was co-developed by Fair Vote Canada and Fair Voting BC and laid out in Fair Vote Canada's submission to the federal Special Committee on Electoral Reform in 2016. Byron Weber Becker and Antony Hodgson later described two variants of the rural–urban model at the request of the Special Committee – one based on the original FVC/FVBC proposal that would require the addition of a small number of top-up seats, and a second that could be implemented without changing the existing number of seats in parliament by integrating the compensatory seats into the largest multi-member districts within each region.

Later, in 2018, the BC government used the name rural-urban to describe a significantly altered version of FVC and FVBC's original rural-urban model and proposed it as one of three PR systems to be adopted in British Columbia (BC) had voters decided to adopt a proportional voting system in a 2018 referendum in the province. Rather than using a combination of multi-member districts and top-up seats throughout the province, as originally envisioned by FVC/FVBC, the BC government proposed using STV in the cities and mixed-member proportional in more rural areas.

This rural–urban model was the only proportional voting system proposed in BC's 2018 electoral reform referendum to include a proportional voting system previously used in Canada: Alberta and Manitoba used multi-member STV in major cities to elect provincial members of the Legislative Assembly (MLAs) for 30 years from the 1920s to the 1950s. This approach produced proportional outcomes in the cities where STV was used, but not in rural areas, which used STV's non-proportional single-member equivalent, instant-runoff voting (IRV), in single-member ridings. As a result, and because rural seats comprised a large proportion of the total, the overall election results under this system were not proportional. Since the rural–urban model proposed for BC would have used some form of proportional voting in all regions of the province, it would have ensured proportional results province-wide.

== Comparison to other proportional systems ==
As originally conceived by Fair Vote Canada and Fair Voting BC, rural–urban proportional requires fewer top-up seats compared to MMP because the use of multi-member ridings would include a more proportional base to begin with. It is estimated that only 10–15% top-up seats would be needed, versus 40% under MMP.

The inclusion of the redefined rural–urban proportional option in the BC referendum reflected lessons learned from previous referendums in British Columbia and other Canadian jurisdictions related to concerns about previously proposed systems requiring large rural ridings to achieve proportionality.

== Design and operation ==
As described above, the rural–urban PR model laid out by the BC government was a hybrid of two electoral options for achieving proportional representation: STV and MMP. Urban areas would use the single transferable vote for elections and rural areas would use the mixed-member proportional system.

In urban and semi-urban areas using STV, existing urban ridings would join together to form multi-member ridings and typically electing 3–7 MLAs using ranked ballot. The candidates elected would reflect the popular vote of the voters in these larger, multi-member ridings. The use of a ranked ballot permits a high degree of voter choice by permitting voters to rank preferences for multiple candidates. For urban and semi-urban voters, this makes rural–urban proportional very similar to BC-STV.

In rural ridings using MMP, voters would have two votes: one to elect their local MLA, and another that would be used to elect a regional MLA to ensure the proportionality of overall results in rural regions. Their first vote on the ballot would be used to elect a local MLA in the same way as the current first-past-the-post (FPTP) electoral system: the candidate with the most votes would be elected. The second vote would be used in either an open list or closed list system in which voters select either a candidate or party to represent them at a regional level. However, it is expected that only open list have any real likelihood of being implemented. These regional MLAs are used as "top-ups" so that overall proportionality is achieved in rural regional areas, given the lack of proportionality that results from first-past-the-post elections. Top-up MLAs would be elected using regional party lists. A commitment has been made that no region will lose ridings under any of the three proposed electoral systems in the 2018 electoral reform referendum.

== Support ==
Rural–urban proportional was one of three "made-in-Canada" systems endorsed by Fair Vote Canada in its submission to the 2016 Special Parliamentary Committee on Electoral Reform. The other two were MMP and STV. Fair Voting BC gave rural–urban proportional its highest ranking in its scorecard of proportional voting systems. During the federal government's consultation on electoral reform at the federal level in 2016, both the New Democratic Party of Canada and Green Party of Canada recommended Canada adopt either RUP or MMP.

The BC government's version of rural–urban proportional received 29.31% support in the 2018 referendum, just shy of the 29.45% received by dual-member proportional and over 10% behind the highest-scoring mixed-member proportional option at 41.24%.
