= 2005 British Columbia electoral reform referendum =

Referendum on electoral reform in 2005

- May 17, 2005
- Should British Columbia change to the BC-STV electoral system as recommended by the Citizens' Assembly on Electoral Reform?
- Outcome: No
- Website: Reports, Elections BC

Results
Choice	Votes	%
Yes	981,419	57.69%
No	719,716	42.31%
Valid votes	1,701,135	97.24%
Invalid or blank votes	48,204	2.76%
Total votes	1,749,339	100.00%
Registered voters/turnout	2,845,284	61.48%
- Results by riding

A referendum was held in the Canadian province of British Columbia on May 17, 2005, to determine whether or not to adopt the recommendation of the Citizens' Assembly on Electoral Reform to replace the existing first-past-the-post electoral system (FPTP) with a single transferable vote system (BC-STV). It was held in conjunction with the BC Legislative Assembly election of 2005. Voters were given two ballots at that time: a ballot to vote for a Member of the Legislative Assembly of British Columbia (MLA) in their constituency and a referendum ballot. The referendum received considerable support from the electorate but failed in meeting the 60-percent threshold that had been set. A second referendum was held in 2009.

== Background ==
The first half of the 2000s was marked by a growing movement in favour of electoral reform in Canada. Liberals in British Columbia, Quebec and Ontario campaigned successfully in each of these provinces with commitments to electoral reform. A reform initiative was launched as well in PEI, as well, in response to a series of lopsided elections in that province. In 2004, the Law Commission of Canada published an influential report on electoral reform, with a strong recommendation in favour of a mixed member proportional (MMP) system.

In British Columbia, impetus was created by the anomalous provincial election result in 1996, in which the NDP won reelection as a majority government with 39.5 percent of the vote and 39 seats, despite gaining 3 percent fewer votes than the Liberals at 41.8 percent of the total and 33 seats. The balance of the vote was picked up by the Reform Party, which won 9.3 percent of the vote (two seats) and the Progressive Democrats with 5.7 percent of the vote (one seat), representing a perfect example of vote-splitting by conservative and liberal parties leading the NDP to majority status. There followed another lopsided election in 2001, in which the Liberals won 77 out of 79 seats, virtually wiping out the opposition, with 57 percent of the vote.

According to Pilon, "British Columbia has had a long dalliance with voting reform initiatives" municipally and provincially since the 1930s, coinciding with the emergence of left-wing forces capable of splitting the vote and going "up the middle" to take power, such as the way that the NDP won the 1996 election. In his view, this is what led the Liberals to take up voting system reform at the provincial level in the late 1990s.

The Liberal government of Premier Gordon Campbell had campaigned in favour of electoral reform in 2001, and was under pressure to deliver. Following the Liberal victory in the 2001, the Liberals faced the political dilemma of having campaigned on an issue that no longer interested them in the same way. Meanwhile, the Green party attempted to use the provincial initiative referendum process to force the issue, and although they were unsuccessful, this kept the issue alive. In 2003, the Liberal government, with the agreement of the opposition New Democratic Party, established a Citizens' Assembly on Electoral Reform, mandating it to propose a new electoral system that would subsequently be put to a referendum.

== Timeline of Citizen's Assembly process ==
The following indicates some of the key events leading up to the referendum:

- September 20, 2002 — The government appoints former British Columbia Liberal Party leader Gordon Gibson to recommend the structure of the Citizens' Assembly.
- April 28, 2003 — The Citizens' Assembly on Electoral Reform is created by motion of the Legislative Assembly of British Columbia.
- January 2004 — The Citizen's Assembly is convened. It consists of 161 members, one woman and one man randomly selected from each of the 79 existing electoral districts, two first Nations members and a chair.
- January to October 2004 — Assembly proceedings include a learning phase, public hearings and a deliberative phase.
- October 23 and 23. Assembly members vote on different options in three separate votes. A first vote asked members to express their preference for MMP or STV. This vote yielded a strong, but not unanimous preference for STV: 123 votes for STV vs. 31 for MMP. Members then voted between retaining FPTP or moving to STV. There was a strong preference for STV: 142 votes for STV vs. 11 for retaining FPTP. Finally, the Assembly voted in favour of submitting a recommendation in favour of STV to the public in a referendum on May 17, 2005: 146 in favour vs. 7 against.
- December 10, 2004 — The final report of the Assembly, recommending BC-STV, is presented to the government.
- February 2005 — A separate Final Report on the work of the Assembly is submitted to the legislature by the Special Committee on the Citizens' Assembly on Electoral Reform in February 2005.
- May 17, 2005 — The referendum is held in conjunction with the 2005 BC election.

== Proposed changes to the electoral system ==
The current electoral system in BC is first-past-the-post (FPTP). In this system, a voter gives one vote to one candidate in one electoral district. Each political party runs no more than one candidate in each electoral district. The candidate with the most votes in the electoral district wins, whether they received a majority of votes or not, and is charged with representing all voters in the electoral district.

The proposed electoral system is a customized version of single transferable vote (STV) called BC-STV. In this system, each electoral district would have between 2 and 7 seats depending on its population and geographic size, and electors would vote for district representatives. Although each elector would have only one vote, as the expression STV indicates, the ballot would allow electors to rank their preferences. The STV model proposed by the Assembly avoided the use of party lists, which they felt would be unpopular with British Columbians. Instead, voters would choose among candidates by name and when ranking candidates, could choose candidates from different parties, thus retaining the maximum amount of freedom in choosing whom to elect.

Having multiple seats in one district would allow those seats to be allocated in a way that reflects the distribution of votes among the district's candidates in a roughly proportional way. Political parties may nominate as many candidates in an electoral district as there are available seats, or they might prefer to concentrate their efforts on a smaller number of candidates. Major parties will typically nominate more candidates than minor parties, as they will be hopeful of electing a larger number of MLAs. Candidates would be grouped by political party in separate columns on the ballot paper.

To establish the winners, a quota for the district would be determined based on the number of valid ballots cast and the number of seats available in the district. All the votes would be counted and sorted by the voters' first preferences. Those candidates with enough first-preference votes to meet or exceed the quota are elected. A multiple-step vote counting and transfer process is then used to determine the winners of the remaining seats in the district, based on voters' alternate preferences. Although the mechanics of the vote-transfer process can be complicated, the general principle is that all votes should count, so that if a voter's first-preference candidate is not elected, or has more votes than needed to be elected, the votes in question will be transferred to another candidate based on alternate preferences.

== Question and thresholds ==
The question asked was: Should British Columbia change to the BC-STV electoral system as recommended by the Citizens' Assembly on Electoral Reform?

Although according to Pilon, there was no compelling legal or historical precedent for doing so, the Electoral Reform Referendum Act established two super-majority thresholds for the referendum results to be binding on government:

- at least 60 percent of the valid votes cast in support of the proposal and
- a simple majority in favour in at least 60 percent of all electoral districts (48 out of 79).

== The campaign ==
Although the Citizen's Assembly had come to a remarkable degree of consensus in favour of BC-STV after months of study and deliberation, there is an important distinction to be made between such a consultative process and a general referendum in which there is much less opportunity for learning and deliberation by ordinary voters and where political interests are more likely to come into play. As LeDuc et al. point out, "Deliberative democracy and direct democracy are different processes, and the dynamic of a referendum campaign will typically be quite different than that of a deliberative body."

The referendum campaign started with the Citizen's Assembly's announcement of its conclusions in late October 2004. This was followed by an initial flush of media coverage, including a favorable op. ed. by the influential Gordon Gibson in the Globe and Mail. However, other Globe and Mail coverage was much less favourable, and indeed dismissive. Provincial media seemed more sympathetic, drawing attention to the work of the Citizen's Assembly. Some high-profile media and columnists eventually endorsed the STV proposal, based on the case put forward by the Citizen's Assembly but many others remained opposed.

Public efforts to educate the public about the referendum were under the responsibility of Elections BC and the BC government. In order to protect the neutrality of its role, Elections BC did not provide information on the Citizens' Assembly proposal in comparison to the FPTP system. Its role was to ensure that voters had information on voter registration opportunities and information on the administration of the referendum. This left responsibility for promoting awareness and understanding of the two electoral systems to the government. In March 2005, the government established a Referendum Information Office with a mandate to provide voters with information to make an informed choice on the referendum question. The Referendum Information Office created a website and fact sheets, mailed a brochure to every residential household in the province, and established a toll-free information line (Elections BC Report 2005: 36).

Poll results about the extent of voter knowledge about the referendum suggest that these efforts were ineffective (see the section on Voter polls and surveys, below). An unfortunate hiccup flagged by Dennis Pilon 2010: 78) is that the brochures distributed to each household by the Referendum Information Office resembled newspaper advertising inserts and were likely discarded unopened by most voters.

However, the onus of informing the public did not rest exclusively on public organizations. As noted, the media also played a role, and aside from expressing their own views or those of their columnists, they also provided a space for advocates on both sides to express their views (Pilon 2010: 79).

Legislation regulating the referendum process did not establish a formal role for "Yes/No" groups but required advertising sponsors to register, include identification statements on all advertising and submit financial reports following the referendum. No spending limits were imposed on referendum advertising sponsors" (Elections BC 2005: 36). Two groups did form in an attempt to fill the information gap and influence the outcome. In support of the STV proposal was a group called YES-STV led organizationally by a local advocacy group called Fair Voting BC. It included members of the former Citizen's Assembly, activists from Fair Vote Canada and a number of academics and celebrity supporters. The No side, calling itself KNOW-STV included a few former politicians, backroom operatives from the Liberal and NDP parties, and two former members of the Citizen's Assembly (Pilon 2010: 78).

Remarkably, as Pilon elaborates (Pilon 2010: 78-79), none of the major parties came out formally in support of the proposed reforms. Even Green Party leader Adrienne Carr expressed a preference for a different version of proportional representation than STV, although many Green candidates ignored their leader and openly supported the Citizen's Assembly proposal. The NDP and its leader Carole James were also critical of the proposed STV model while refusing to make it a campaign issue. Even though the BC NDP had committed to adopt proportional representation in 1999, they claimed to prefer a different model and the party was deeply split on the issue in general. As for the Liberals, Premier Campbell remained neutral but as a party, the Liberals were largely opposed to electoral reform. Indeed, the government imposition of a supermajority requirement for the referendum to be binding was widely seen as a concession to members of the Liberal caucus opposed to reform. Voters seeking guidance from the parties on how to vote in the referendum were thus left without very much direction.

== Voter polls and surveys ==
Voter polls and surveys conducted prior to the referendum dealt with the degree of voter awareness and knowledge about the referendum as well as voter intentions.

On the former subject, various surveys pointed to low levels of awareness that did not seem to improve significantly as the referendum approached. Pilon 2010: 77) cites the following results:

- a February 21, 2005, poll by Ipso-Reid (conducted in early February) showing that 50 percent of respondents were aware of the referendum but two-thirds of them claimed to know "very little" or "nothing" about BC-STV;
- a Strategic Council poll in April 2005 finding that nearly half of respondents knew "nothing at all" about the proposal, while another 42 percent claimed to know "a little." Only 10 percent felt they knew "a lot" about it;
- Angus Reid polling in the final weeks of the campaign (published April 30 and May 14), showing 64 percent to 66 percent of respondents still claiming they knew "nothing" or "very little" about the proposal.

As Pilon concludes, "the public seemed only vaguely aware of the referendum and poorly informed of what was at stake in making their decision" (ibid.).

Meanwhile, surveys on voter intentions such as the following showed rising support for the referendum over time, and some decline in the share of undecided voters.

- Nordic Research Group April 28, 2005
  - Yes: 32 percent; no: 16 percent; undecided: 52 percent
- Ipsos-Reid April 30, 2005
  - Yes: 42 percent; no: 38 percent
- Ipsos-Reid May 14, 2005
  - Yes 47 percent; no: 35 percent; undecided: 13 percent; will not vote: 3 percent

By the time of the above Ipso-Reid survey results announced on the eve of the referendum, the referendum seemed destined to secure majority support and might even pass the 60 percent threshold. Much would depend on how voters would swing at the last moment on an important issue about which most of them felt ill-informed.

== Results ==
The final result of the referendum was favourable to the proposed reform, which was supported by 57.7 percent of the electorate, vs. 42.3 percent voting against it. A majority of pro-reform votes was obtained in 77 out of 79 districts. The following table provides the details.

Option		Popular Vote		Districts carried
Option		#	%	#	%
X	No	719,716	42.31%	2	2.53%
	Yes*	981,419	57.69%	77	97.47%
Total		1,701,135	100.0%	79	100.0%

Although the proposal failed to meet the thresholds established for the reform to be binding, the result was very close. The threshold requiring majority support in at least 60 percent of districts was easily met, with 97 percent of districts satisfying this criterion, and the overall popular vote was just 2.3 percent shy of the threshold.

== Analysis ==
The unexpectedly high popularity of the voting reform surprised many. Although polls conducted in April and May indicated more support for the proposal than against it, the number of undecided voters remained high, and there was an expectation that "a bewildered public would simply vote it down on election day" as can typically happen (Pilon 2010: 80). Yet despite this, the measure gained a 57.7 percent approval in the province on voting day.

That the public was poorly informed right up to the date of the referendum is certain. Post-referendum research and analysis pointed to the ineffectiveness of public education efforts, of the YES-STV and KNOW-STV campaigns, and of the media to act as "effective grassroots indicators" (Pilon 2010: 81). Meanwhile, the referendum campaign received limited media attention, as both major parties were officially neutral on the proposed change. Just days before the referendum, two thirds of British Columbians admitted to knowing "nothing/very little" about the proposed STV system (Pilon 2010: 77 and 79).

However they were strongly inclined towards proportionality, choice among multiple parties, and even coalition governments. Post-election analysis confirmed that most people knew little about the details of STV. Better informed voters did tend to vote in support of the proposal, but other supporters of the proposal seemed to rely on a positive appreciation and respect for the work of the Citizen's Assembly. Positive appreciation of the Citizen's Assembly thus appears to have been an important factor in the level of approval that was achieved, and the Assembly members played a role in this, by calling attention to the role of the Assembly in drafting the referendum question.

According to a post-referendum survey conducted by Nordic Research, over half of those who voted against STV said that they did so because they did not feel knowledgeable.

A remarkable feature of the BC 2005 referendum was the extent of voter support across party lines. In particular, the research showed Liberals, Greens and undecided voters quite supporting of STV, with well over 60 percent support among these groups, but support among Liberals was fairly high as well, at about 50 percent (Carty et al., op. cit.). As Pilon points out, the aftermath of the 1996 and 2001 elections had left many partisans of both the NDP and Liberal parties unsure about their parties future and open to proposals for reform and the moment was ripe for the referendum to secure support across party lines, despite the lack of support or even opposition from party leaders (Pilon 2010: 80)

== Aftermath ==
There was some ambivalence on how to proceed following the referendum, considering the strong support that it had shown, while falling short of the threshold for it to be binding. The Liberal government, which had been reelected the day of the referendum, put off any comment on how it would respond until the fall of 2005. The public itself was quite divided; and some in the electoral reform community expressed concern that the Legislature might impose a "watered-down" or partisan-inspired system in lieu of the STV model.

The Liberals' response came in Premier Gordon Campbell's September 12 Speech from the Throne. The speech rejected the call for introducing STV immediately and rejected a re-opening of the process to consider other options. Instead, it announced a second referendum on the STV proposal, with some adjustments: this time, a provisional map of STV ridings would be prepared in advance, and public funds would be provided to both pro- and anti-STV groups "to support active information campaigns for supporters and detractors of each model." BC-STV would remain intact as the proposed alternative to FPTP and the 60 percent threshold would also remain in place.

The original intent in the Speech from the Throne was that the referendum would be rerun in conjunction with the B.C. municipal elections in November 2008 in time to be implemented in the next provincial election should it be approved. However, the Premier later issued a statement, on April 27, 2006, indicating that the date of the referendum would be postponed until May 2009 to coincide with the next provincial election. He explained that this was being done after consulting with Elections BC to reduce the cost of running the referendum while ensuring that there would be enough time to prepare for the next election should the referendum call for an STV model to be implemented.

== See also ==
- Fair Vote Canada
- 2009 British Columbia electoral reform referendum
- BC-STV
- 2018 British Columbia electoral reform referendum
