= 2009 British Columbia electoral reform referendum =

Referendum on electoral reform in 2009

- May 12, 2009
- Which electoral system should British Columbia use to elect members to the provincial Legislative Assembly?
- Outcome: The existing electoral system (first-past-the-post)
- Website: Reports, Elections BC

Results
Choice	Votes	%
The single transferable vote electoral system (BC-STV), proposed by the Citizens' Assembly on Electoral Reform	623,420	39.09%
The existing electoral system (first-past-the-post)	971,353	60.91%
Valid votes	1,594,773	96.59%
Invalid or blank votes	56,366	3.41%
Total votes	1,651,139	100.00%
Registered voters/turnout	2,995,465	55.12%
- Results by riding

Following the 2005 electoral reform referendum, British Columbia held a second referendum on electoral reform in conjunction with the provincial election on May 12, 2009. As in 2005, voters in 2009 were asked which electoral system should be used to elect legislators: the existing first-past-the-post electoral system or the BC single transferable vote electoral system (BC-STV) proposed by the British Columbia Citizen's Assembly on Electoral Reform to ensure more proportional representation in the provincial Legislative Assembly.

The referendum was defeated, with 60.9 percent voting against the reform and 39.09 percent of voters supporting the change.

BC later held another referendum on electoral reform in 2018.

== Scheduling ==
The government of British Columbia initially scheduled the second referendum to be conducted alongside the 2008 municipal elections. On April 26, 2007, Premier Gordon Campbell announced that the referendum date would be shifted to May 12, 2009. Conducting a referendum alongside the May provincial election was estimated to cost between $1 million and $2 million. The chief electoral officer had warned that a referendum in tandem with the municipal election would have cost up to $30 million. The chief electoral officer had also raised concerns regarding to adequacy of facilities, a shortage of trained voting officials, and differing voter eligibility requirements for local and provincial voters' lists.

== Proposed electoral boundaries ==
In the 2005 referendum, voters cast ballots for or against BC-STV without knowing how the new system would affect their electoral ridings. This uncertainty led to voter concerns that, to create ridings large enough to support the multiple representatives preferred under BC-STV, ridings would be merged into unmanageably-large districts, particularly in the less densely populated north and interior of the province.

The post-election Speech from the Throne identified this as a critical piece to be addressed for the second referendum: "One task that was never assigned to the Citizens' Assembly was to show precisely how its proposed STV model might apply on an electoral map. This was arguably a design flaw in its terms of reference that in retrospect may have impacted how people voted in the referendum. Your government believes that establishing STV constituency boundaries may provide the public with a critical piece of information that was missing at the time of the referendum."

The ensuing electoral boundaries redistribution prompted significant controversy for reasons largely unrelated to the BC-STV system, and on several occasions it seemed possible that the commission's work, including its STV recommendations, might be rejected altogether. Ultimately, a bipartisan agreement between the governing Liberals and opposition New Democrats saw the passage of the Electoral Districts Act, 2008 on April 10, 2008, which implemented, with modification, the report of the Electoral Boundaries Commission. 20 STV electoral districts returning a total of 85 MLAs were accordingly established.

== Question ==
In 2005 voters had been asked: "Should British Columbia change to the BC-STV electoral system as recommended by the Citizens' Assembly on Electoral Reform?"

But in 2009 they were asked:

Which electoral system should British Columbia use to elect members to the provincial Legislative Assembly?
- The existing electoral system (First-Past-the-Post)
- The single transferable vote electoral system (BC-STV) proposed by the Citizens' Assembly on Electoral Reform

== Campaigns ==
Legislation to allow a second referendum on an alternative electoral system, the Electoral Reform Referendum 2009 Act, was introduced in the provincial legislature on March 8, 2008, by Attorney-General Wally Oppal.

Public funding was available to groups who are supporters or detractors of both the single transferable vote (STV) and the first-past-the-post election systems. Through the chief electoral officer, registered groups were to be given funds to provide information and educational material about their positions. Each side had access to a total of $500,000 in public funding and an equivalent amount funded a neutral public information campaign.

On January 12, 2009, the Attorney General issued an information bulletin announcing the proponent and opponent groups. The officially recognized proponent group was Fair Voting BC, which operated under the campaign name "British Columbians for STV", while the recognized opponent group was the No STV Campaign Society led by Bill Tieleman, which campaigned under the name "No STV". The Citizens' Assembly Alumni group, representing the bulk of the original Citizens' Assembly members, continued to play an active role in promoting their recommendation working in close cooperation with Fair Voting BC.

== Results ==
Option		Popular Vote		Districts carried
Option		#	%	#	%
X	FPTP	971,350	60.91%	77	90.59%
	BC-STV	623,420	39.09%	8	9.41%
Total		1,594,770	100%

The referendum would have required 60 per cent overall approval and 50 per cent approval in at least 60 per cent (51 out of 85) of the province's electoral districts in order to succeed. If the vote had been in favour of BC-STV, the new electoral system would have been scheduled to be in place for BC's 2013 election. However, the province's voters defeated the change with only 39.09% of 1,651,139 votes in favour of BC-STV (representing a 55% voter turnout).

== Opinion polls ==
On April 15, Yes for BC-STV published a press release stating that an Angus Reid Poll, conducted between March 9 to 12, showed 65% support for BC-STV, but that awareness for the referendum was at 44%.

== See also ==
- BC-STV, which provides succinct coverage of the BC-STV proposal and both the 2005 and 2009 referendums
- 2005 British Columbia electoral reform referendum
- Fair Vote Canada
- 2018 British Columbia electoral reform referendum
