= Nordic Research Group =

Canadian research company

NRG Research Group
- Founded: 2005
- Headquarters: Vancouver, Canada
- Key people: Brian Owen; Andrew Enns

NRG Research Group is a Canadian public affairs and market research company that provides strategic consulting and analytical services.

NRG was formed in 2005 from the merger of Western Opinion Research and Nordic Research Group. Its senior management includes CEO Brian Owen (founder of Western Opinion Research and later NRG) and President Andrew Enns.

NRG is headquartered in Vancouver with offices in Winnipeg, Calgary, and Ottawa. NRG operates 140 CATI stations and has focus group facilities located downtown in Winnipeg and Vancouver.
