= List of British Columbia provincial electoral districts (2001–2009) =

This is a list of British Columbia's 79 provincial electoral districts (also known as ridings in Canadian English) as defined by the 1999 Representation Order, which came into effect for the 2001 election. Obsolete historical districts are listed in the British Columbia provincial electoral districts category page, which can be reached via the Canadian electoral districts category link at the bottom of the individual riding pages listed below.

Electoral districts are constituencies that elect MLAs to the Legislative Assembly of British Columbia every election.

- Abbotsford-Clayburn
- Abbotsford-Mount Lehman
- Alberni-Qualicum
- Bulkley Valley-Stikine
- Burnaby North
- Burnaby-Edmonds
- Burnaby-Willingdon
- Burquitlam
- Cariboo North
- Cariboo South
- Chilliwack-Kent
- Chilliwack-Sumas
- Columbia River-Revelstoke
- Comox Valley
- Coquitlam-Maillardville
- Cowichan-Ladysmith
- Delta North
- Delta South
- East Kootenay
- Esquimalt-Metchosin
- Fort Langley-Aldergrove
- Kamloops
- Kamloops-North Thompson
- Kelowna-Lake Country
- Kelowna-Mission
- Langley
- Malahat-Juan de Fuca
- Maple Ridge-Mission
- Maple Ridge-Pitt Meadows
- Nanaimo
- Nanaimo-Parksville
- Nelson-Creston
- New Westminster
- North Coast
- North Island
- North Vancouver-Lonsdale
- North Vancouver-Seymour
- Oak Bay-Gordon Head
- Okanagan-Vernon
- Okanagan-Westside
- Peace River North
- Peace River South
- Penticton-Okanagan Valley
- Port Coquitlam-Burke Mountain
- Port Moody-Westwood
- Powell River-Sunshine Coast
- Prince George North
- Prince George-Mount Robson
- Prince George-Omineca
- Richmond Centre
- Richmond East
- Richmond-Steveston
- Saanich North and the Islands
- Saanich South
- Shuswap
- Skeena
- Surrey-Cloverdale
- Surrey-Green Timbers
- Surrey-Newton
- Surrey-Panorama Ridge
- Surrey-Tynehead
- Surrey-Whalley
- Surrey-White Rock
- Vancouver-Burrard
- Vancouver-Fairview
- Vancouver-Fraserview
- Vancouver-Hastings
- Vancouver-Kensington
- Vancouver-Kingsway
- Vancouver-Langara
- Vancouver-Mount Pleasant
- Vancouver-Point Grey
- Vancouver-Quilchena
- Victoria-Beacon Hill
- Victoria-Hillside
- West Kootenay-Boundary
- West Vancouver-Capilano
- West Vancouver-Garibaldi
- Yale-Lillooet

== See also ==
- List of British Columbia provincial electoral districts
- Canadian provincial electoral districts
