= BC-STV =

Proposed voting system in British Columbia

BC-STV is the proposed voting system recommended by the Citizens' Assembly on Electoral Reform in October 2004 for use in British Columbia and belongs to the single transferable vote family of voting systems. BC-STV was supported by a majority (57.7 percent) of the voters in a referendum held in 2005 but the government had legislated that it would not be bound by any vote lower than 60 percent in favour in every electoral district. Because of the strong majority support for BC-STV, the government elected to stage a second referendum in 2009, but with increased public funding for information campaigns to better inform the electorate about the differences between the existing and proposed systems. The leadership of both the "yes" side and the "no" side were assigned by the government. The proposal was rejected with 60.9 percent voting against, vs. 39.1 percent in favour, in the 2009 vote.

== Background ==
In 2003, the Liberal government of Premier Gordon Campbell, with the agreement of the opposition New Democratic Party, established a Citizens' Assembly on Electoral Reform, mandating it to propose a new electoral system, which would subsequently be put to referendum. The assembly designed and recommended a system that it named BC-STV (British Columbia Single Transferable Vote), as described in the Assembly's final report. A referendum was held on that recommendation in conjunction with the 2005 BC election.

=== Law preventing promotion of referendum ===
The law governing STV advertising changed after the 2005 referendum. Although it was included as a referendum on the May 12, 2009, ballot, STV promotion was banned from election advertising.

The BC Electoral Reform Referendum 2009 Act Regulation Section.29.4 reads:

Referendum advertising must not, directly or indirectly, (a) promote or oppose a registered political party or the election of a candidate, or (b) form part of election advertising. Section.1 definition – "referendum campaign period" means, in relation to the referendum, the period beginning on February 1, 2009 and ending at the close of general voting for the referendum.

== First referendum ==
The referendum was presented as a Yes/No question, with a Yes vote leading to adoption of BC-STV, and a No vote leading to retention of the existing single-member plurality system. However, the government also legislated that the referendum results would not be binding unless a supermajority of 60 percent of the voters voted the same way (and also formed a simple majority in at least 60 percent (48 of 79) of British Columbia's electoral districts).

While voters in 97 percent of the electoral districts (77 of 79) voted to adopt the BC-STV system, in the province-wide popular vote, only 57.69 percent of the population voted for BC-STV, falling 2.3 percent short of the 60 percent threshold.

Consequently, the results of the referendum were not binding on the government, and the government did not adopt the BC-STV system. However, a decision was taken to hold a second referendum, given how close the results were.

== Second referendum ==
A second referendum on electoral reform was held in conjunction with the provincial election on 12 May 2009. The BC-STV electoral system was again voted on by the British Columbia electorate. To be binding, similar to 2005, the referendum required 60 per cent overall approval and 50 per cent approval in at least 60 per cent of the province's electoral districts. Partially addressing concerns expressed during and after the first referendum campaign, voters were able to consult a map of proposed electoral boundaries under the BC-STV system, and advocacy groups were given some public funding to campaign for and against the new electoral system.

The province's voters defeated the change with only 39.09 percent voting in favour.

== System design ==
=== Summary of system mechanics ===
Since Confederation with Canada in 1871, British Columbia had a system of primarily single-member electoral districts with some multi-member districts, with each voter casting as many votes as there were open seats on an unranked ballot. This mixture of first-past-the-post and block voting was used until 1988, except for two elections in the 1950s, when BC adopted instant-runoff voting (including the use of instant-runoff voting in multi-member districts by filling each seat in the multi-member district in a separate contest). The 17 multi-member districts were eliminated in 1988, with first-past-the-post being used for all seats thereafter.

Unlike the fully single-member system in place since 1988, STV groups all legislative seats regionally into multiple-member electoral districts. This is done so that seats in the region can be allocated in a way that reflects the distribution of votes cast by the district voters. For example, Richmond and Delta's five constituencies at the time would have been combined into one electoral district that would have produced five winners, proportional to the votes in the multi-member district. It is very unlikely that all would have been from the same party, in contrast to the situation in the 1996 election, when one political party captured all five of these seats.

Ranked votes are an integral part of BC-STV. This allows a vote to be transferred to another candidate if the vote is cast for someone who is unelectable and in other cases as well.

Although each voter has only one vote, if the first choice is un-electable, the vote may be transferred to someone who is electable also preferred by the voter. If the first choice marked on the ballot is elected, the winner's surplus votes are determined and part of the surplus vote will be transferred to possibly help elect someone else. This fractional transfer is performed as per the weighted inclusive Gregory method (WIGM).

Thus, a voter's single vote may be apportioned and may be used to elect multiple candidates, based on the voter's ranked preferences if the voter has marked more than one preference. To this end, the voter is invited to rank-order at least several candidates, although they are not required to do so.

On the ballot, the candidates will be grouped by political party in separate columns, as is the practice in the Australian state of Tasmania. However, voters would be allowed to express ranked preferences for candidates of different parties if they chose to do so.

Because of the flexibility allowed by ranked votes, political parties may nominate multiple candidates in a district, sometimes as many candidates in an electoral district as there are available seats, although experience with STV elsewhere (and all elections in general) suggests that not all parties will do so. For instance, in Ireland in a five-seat district, five or more parties run candidates but such a district would typically have a total of about 10 or 15 candidates. Major parties will typically nominate more candidates in a district than will minor parties, as they will be hopeful of electing more representatives.

A quota for the district is determined based on the number of valid ballots cast in the district and the number of seats available in the district. The Droop quota would be used in BC-STV. All the votes in the district are counted and sorted by the voters' first preferences. Those candidates with enough first-preference votes to meet or exceed the quota are declared elected. If not all seats are filled in the first count, a multiple-step candidate-elimination and vote-transfer process is then used to concentrate votes behind successively fewer candidates until the sets are filled by candidates achieving the quota (or winning by plurality if the field of candidates is thinned to the number of remaining open seats).

Although the transfers can be complicated, the assembly expressed the general principle in the following simplified way in its Final Report: "If a voter's favourite candidate (#1) is not elected, or has more votes than are needed to be elected, then the voter's vote is 'moved' to his or her next most favourite candidate (#2). The vote is transferred rather than wasted. The aim of this system is to make all votes count."

=== Proposed electoral district boundaries ===
Under the first-past-the-post or FPTP system, British Columbians elected members from 79 one-member districts in 2005, but this expanded to 85 for the 2009 election. Boundaries commissions, appointed after alternate elections, use census data to maintain a nominally uniform population level across districts (within court-mandated bounds) so that voters have approximately equal representation. Currently, districts have a mean population of about 50,000. However, there can be considerable discrepancies between electoral districts, because districts are permitted to be as small as 75 percent or as large as 125 percent of the provincial average, and even these bounds may be exceeded in special circumstances. Moreover, population migrations between redistrictings can lead to further drift away from uniformity. Vancouver-Burrard has the largest population at about 67,000 people and North Coast has the smallest population at about 27,000 people. As well, a winner in one district under first-past-the-post may be elected with a much higher or lower vote tally than the winner elsewhere, due to lower or higher voter turn-out and to the fact that a winner only needs plurality of valid votes in the district to win. Winning pluralities in Canadian history have ranged from as little as 18 percent to as much as 75 percent.

One of the criticisms of the use of single-member districts is that in many populous communities, in order to create districts with a population of approximately 50,000, it may be necessary to draw arbitrary boundaries that do not necessarily reflect a community of interest.

The Electoral Boundaries Commission which reported in 2008 was charged with drawing up new boundaries for both the single-member system and the proposed new BC-STV system. Under BC-STV, much larger districts would be created that will elect multiple members. Proponents argue that this creates districts with a stronger sense of community and common interest, in which voters will have several MLAs and can get service or representation from any of them. For example, the 11 new single-member constituencies within the municipality of Vancouver would be combined under STV to form two electoral districts, one West, one East. The five electoral districts within Richmond and Delta would be combined to form one electoral district. Each STV district is formed by amalgamating a collection of single-member constituencies; therefore, the total number of MLAs per region, and the population per MLA within each region, is independent of the choice of system.

== Foreign comparisons ==
The proposed BC-STV system was chosen by the members of the Citizens' Assembly to best suit B.C. However, it has specific similarities to and distinctions from STV electoral systems currently being used in other countries:

- Unlike in elections to the Australian Senate and similar to elections in Ireland, Northern Ireland, voters will not be required to rank every candidate; the purpose of this provision is to avoid forcing voters to rank candidates they either do not know or do not support.
- If votes are transferred because a candidate has exceeded the quota and been deemed elected, all of that candidate's ballots are examined for transfer votes using the Gregory method that is used for elections in Northern Ireland and to the Irish Senate (sometimes referred to as "Senatorial rules"). This is different from the Hare method used for Ireland's lower house, the Dáil, whereby if a candidate reaches the quota after the first count, only secondary preferences on the last parcel of votes transferred to that candidate are examined to determine how the surplus, a subset of the last parcel, will be transferred.
- In the case of a vacancy, a by-election would be held under the BC-STV system, as opposed to countback as is used in some STV systems. In a riding with a single vacancy, the alternative vote system would be used. This is similar to the Irish system but differs from the system used in Malta and Tasmania, where the original ballots are recounted with the departing members' votes transferred to their next preferences to determine a new winner.

== See also ==
- 2005 British Columbia electoral reform referendum
- 2009 British Columbia electoral reform referendum
- Citizens' Assembly on Electoral Reform (British Columbia)
- Single transferable vote
- Fair Vote Canada

== Bibliography ==
- Review of STV systems used in Australia, Ireland, Northern Ireland, Estonia, Malta and the Isle of Man
- Ireland: The Archetypal STV System
- Irish Proportional Representation System
