= Citizens' Assembly on Electoral Reform (Ontario) =

2006 independent deliberative body in Canada

The Citizens' Assembly on Electoral Reform was established by the government of the province of Ontario, Canada, in March 2006. Modelled on the British Columbia equivalent, it reviewed the first past the post electoral system currently in use to elect members of the Ontario Legislature, with the authority to recommend an alternative. In May 2007, the assembly recommended, in a decision of 94 to 8, that Ontario adopt a form of mixed member proportional representation (MMP).

== Report of the Select Committee on Electoral Reform ==
The mandate of the assembly was created by the Report of the Select Committee on Electoral Reform of the Ontario legislature. It was made up of members of Provincial Parliament (MPPs) from the Liberal, Progressive Conservative and New Democratic parties. The committee studied electoral systems and issued a report to the Ontario Legislature in November 2005. It recommended the assembly be provided the latitude necessary to recommend whatever electoral system is consistent with Ontario's (and Canada's) constitution. It assessed several alternatives.

== Selection ==
Similar to the British Columbia equivalent, the Ontario assembly was composed of 103 randomly selected citizens, one from each Ontario constituency. As well, the selection process controlled for the age distribution of the province. The selection process for the Ontario Citizens' Assembly began in April 2006 and was completed in June 2006.

Prospective members of the assembly were selected at random by Elections Ontario from the Permanent Register of Electors of Ontario. Every registered voter was eligible with the exception of elected officials. Citizens that received an invitation letter were asked if they would be interested in placing their name in the draw. Of the approximately 12,000 respondents, about 1,200 were invited to attend selection meetings across the province.

At each selection meeting, candidates decided whether to put their names into a ballot box from which one member and two alternates were selected. Ultimately, 52 of the members of the assembly were female and 51 were male. At least one member of the assembly was Aboriginal.

== Process ==
Under chairperson George Thomson, the independent body of citizens met twice a month from September 9, 2006 (six weekends in the third quarter of 2006 and six from February 17 to April 29) to examine the current electoral system. Queen's University Associate Professor of Political Science, Jonathan Rose, led the assembly in the Learning and Deliberation Phase in the fourth quarter of 2006 and the first quarter of 2007. The assembly also held public meetings across the province between November and January under the direction of Susan Pigott. After learning and consultation, they spent an additional six weekends deliberating on options and whether or not to change the current system.

The assembly's work ended with the submission of their final report due on May 15, 2007, recommending a mixed member proportional system similar to that used in New Zealand.

As a result of their recommendation, Ontario voters considered changing their electoral system in an electoral reform referendum held on October 10, 2007, concurrent with the 2007 Ontario general election. The question was, "Which electoral system should Ontario use to elect members to the provincial legislature?" with the options being MMP or first-past-the-post. The referendum result was binding if passed by 60 percent of the vote overall, and by 50 percent of the vote in each of at least 60 percent, or 64, of the 107 electoral districts. This threshold was decided by the Ontario cabinet, despite the recommendation of the Select Committee that it require only 50 percent support in two-thirds, or 71, of the 107 ridings.

=== Students' Assembly ===
To complement the work on the assembly, the provincial government provided financial support for the Students' Assembly on Electoral Reform. Composed of secondary students from across Ontario, it also concluded that Ontario should switch to the MMP (mixed member proportional) system. These findings were presented to the Citizens' Assembly on Electoral Reform on February 17, 2007.

== Results ==
The assembly's recommendation was voted upon by Ontario voters in the referendum held on October 10, 2007, at the same time as the provincial election. 63 percent of Ontarians voted in favour of first-past-the-post and no change to the Ontario electoral system was made as a result.

=== Reaction ===
By the end of the campaign, assembly members were critical of both the media coverage of their work and of the $6.8 million educational campaign, directed by Elections Ontario.

The assembly member for Beaches-East York, Catherine Baquero, stated "I'm very disappointed there's been a lack of meaningful debate. [...] I'm disappointed that Elections Ontario's education campaign has been so toothless. What I expected was a more detailed discussion of the pros and cons of each system."

Another assembly member, Rich Browridge, concurred with Baquero: "There's an awful lack of understanding on the proposition. I think that's too bad. Elections Ontario isn't doing its job. [...] There's been no real attempt at a major public education campaign, and that's what was needed."

== Significance ==
The assembly process was premised on the idea that average citizens can come together to make good decisions on various policy issues by means of deliberating these issues. In particular, it is seen as a good method for studying electoral reform as politicians face a fundamental conflict of interest when it comes to evaluating the system that elects them.

Advocates of Canadian federal electoral reform considered the Ontario vote as crucial because they felt the adoption of proportional representation in Canada's most populous province would have provided impetus for reform and practical Canadian evidence on how proportional systems respond to voters.

== See also ==
- Citizens' assembly
- Elections in Canada
