= Fair Vote Canada =

Electoral reform nonprofit organization

- Founded: July 27, 2001; 25 years ago
- Founder: Chris Billows, Doug Bailie and Larry Gordon
- Purpose: Electoral reform in Canada, proportional representation
- Location(s): 88 North Drive; Kitchener, Ontario; N2M 1K8
- Region served: Canada
- Key people: Anita Nickerson (executive director)
- Website: www.fairvote.ca

Fair Vote Canada (FVC) (French: Represéntation équitable au Canada) is a grassroots, nonprofit, multi-partisan citizens' movement for electoral reform in Canada. Headquartered in Kitchener, Ontario, it promotes the introduction of an element of proportional representation for elections at all levels of government and throughout civil society, instead of the first-past-the-post electoral system currently used at all levels of government in Canada.

== Purpose ==
Its aim is "to gain broad, multi-partisan support for an independent, citizen-driven process to allow Canadians to choose a fair voting system based on the principles that all voters are equal, and that every vote must count." Fair Vote Canada does not advocate for any particular form of proportional representation but has been involved in the design and discussion of different models from a made-in-Canada perspective.

It has worked to mobilize its supporters in support of proportional representation in the context of several initiatives coming out of the Canadian provinces and was one of the prime drivers of citizens' engagement federally as part of the public consultation process in 2016.

== History ==
Fair Vote Canada was created in June 2001, following a founding conference in Ottawa. It is a membership organization headed by a national council of 15 members and has chapters and action teams across the country.

Over the years, it has:

- organized events, tables and presentations
- written letters, articles and op-eds
- educated and lobbied MPs and politicians
- pulled together research and worked with academics
- participated in six referendum campaigns (two in PEI, one in Ontario and three in BC)
- maintained a strong social media presence through its website and on Facebook and Twitter

Additionally, it has submitted briefs to numerous electoral reform committees and commissions.

In British Columbia and Quebec, there exist parallel organizations, Fair Voting BC and Mouvement Démocratie Nouvelle respectively, which are independent of Fair Vote Canada but share similar goals. Fair Vote Canada collaborates closely with these organizations.

Fair Vote Canada strives to maintain a nationwide, multi-partisan support base, with members from all points on the political spectrum, regions and walks of life. Its work is endorsed by its National Advisory Board, which includes prominent Conservatives, Liberals, New Democrats, and Greens. It supports political parties and politicians that share its aspirations for electoral reform.

== Documentation ==
Fair Vote Canada maintains a Review of Evidence based on comparative research about countries with different types of electoral systems and tracks the various Commissions, Assemblies and Reports that have been produced in Canada and its provinces over the years. Fair Vote Canada's "Resources" webpage provides a wide range of public education materials.

== Democracy Day ==
On August 2, 2011, Fair Vote Canada launched Democracy Day and Democracy Week in Canada annual events encouraging participation, education, and celebration of Canadian democracy. In its first year events were held by different groups in cities across Canada. Fair Vote Canada designated Democracy Day to be Canada's celebration of the United Nations International Day of Democracy and Democracy Week to be the seven-day calendar week in which Democracy Day falls (September 15 each year). A number of Canadian non-profit and governmental organizations participate in and promote the events, including Elections Canada.

== See also ==
- Canadian House of Commons Special Committee on Electoral Reform
- Citizens' Assembly on Electoral Reform (British Columbia)
- Citizens' Assembly on Electoral Reform (Ontario)
- Electoral reform in Canada
- Elections in Canada
- Referendums in Canada
