= Citizens' Assembly on Electoral Reform (British Columbia) =

2004 independent deliberative body in Canada

The Citizens' Assembly on Electoral Reform was created by the government of British Columbia, Canada to investigate changes to the provincial electoral system. On October 25, 2004, the citizens' assembly proposed replacing the province's existing first past the post (FPTP) system with BC-STV, a single transferable vote (STV) system. This recommendation was put to the electorate in a referendum in 2005 held during that year's provincial election. The provincial government required the referendum to achieve a super-majority of 60 percent of voters and simple majorities in 60 percent of the 79 districts in order to pass. The second of these thresholds was easily met, with a majority supporting the reform in 77 out of 79 electoral districts, but the overall vote fell short of the 60 percent requirement, with 57.69 percent of the votes in favour. A second referendum in 2009 on adopting the STV system also failed to pass carrying 8 electoral districts and 39.09 percent of the overall vote.

The assembly has been credited with inspiring experiments in Canada (including Ontario), Ireland and Australia among others.

== History ==
During the 2001 provincial election, the Liberal Party promised to create a citizens' assembly to consider changes to the provincial electoral system (as opposed to forming a Royal Commission, as New Zealand did). The recommendation of the assembly would then be put as a referendum. In December 2002, Gordon Gibson submitted his report, recommending an assembly composed of randomly selected citizens, two from each of the province's 79 electoral districts. In April 2003, the Legislature unanimously adopted the concept and most of the details.

== Selection process ==
Counting the chair, the BC Citizens' Assembly on Electoral Reform was composed of 161 members: one man and one woman randomly selected from each of BC's 79 electoral districts, two Aboriginal members and a chair. Assembly members were selected by a civic lottery that aimed for balance by gender, age group and geographical distribution of the population.

Selection of members for the assembly involved a three-stage process:

- Stage one began in August 2003 when 15,800 invitations were mailed to randomly identified British Columbians. To ensure even geographical representation, 200 invitations were extended in each constituency. Invitees were asked if they were willing to put their names into a draw for future candidacy.
- In stage two, the names of respondents expressing interest went into a pool for their constituency. Positive respondents were organized into 79 groups of 20, with some structuring to ensure an even split between men and women and reflect the age distribution of individuals in the constituency. These candidates were then invited to information meetings where they heard presentations about the assembly and were asked to publicly confirm their eligibility and interest in participating.
- In stage three, the names of those who responded positively were sealed into envelopes and entered into a final draw. Two people from each district pool, one man and one woman, were selected by random draw for membership in the Citizens' Assembly. Selection into the assembly continued until December 2003. Two additional members, representing First Nations communities, were added after the selection of the original 158.

== Assembly proceedings ==
From January to May 2004, the assembly conducted a twelve-week "learning phase" involving expert presentations, group discussions and access to source materials. Work included a review of electoral systems in use around the world and their various effects on the political process. This was followed by a public consultation phase lasting from May to June. Assembly members held over 50 public hearings and received a total of 1603 written submissions.

Between September and October 2004, the members deliberated over which electoral system to recommend, emphasizing three values deemed most important: fairness of representation, local representation and voter choice. Among the alternatives considered were a mixed member proportional system (MMP) and a single transferable vote (STV) system.

On October 23 and 24, 2004, the assembly voted on different options in three separate votes. A first vote asked members to express their preference for MMP or STV. This vote yielded a strong but not unanimous preference for STV: 123 votes for STV versus 31 for MMP. Members then voted between retaining FPTP or moving to STV. There was a strong preference for STV: 142 votes for STV versus 11 for retaining FPTP. Finally, the assembly voted on whether to submit a recommendation in favour of STV to the public in a referendum on May 17, 2005, which passed with 146 in favour and 7 against.

On December 10, the assembly's final report, titled Making Every Vote Count: The Case for Electoral Reform in British Columbia, was presented to the BC legislature by the assembly. It recommended changing the electoral system to a localized version of STV called BC-STV. A separate final report on the work of the assembly was submitted to the legislature by the Special Committee on the Citizens' Assembly on Electoral Reform in February 2005.

== Outcomes ==
In May 2005, the recommendations from the assembly were approved by 57.7 percent of voters in a referendum and were supported by a majority of voters in 77 of the province's 79 electoral districts. However, the provincial government at the time required the referendum to attain a super-majority to pass, including:

1. 60 percent popular support across the province
2. 50 percent approval in 60 percent of the province's 79 electoral districts or 48 electoral districts

With the first condition unmet, no change ensued. Similar recommendations received support from 39.1 percent of voters in a follow-up referendum in 2009.

The assembly has been credited with inspiring and popularizing the concept of Citizens' Assemblies around the world, including in Canada (including Ontario), Ireland and Australia among others.

== Analysis ==
Michael Pal noted that had the decision been made to set a threshold below 60 percent, that the measure likely would have passed.

James Fishkin argued that because the process was not public, and was not widely understood, that the recommendations did not carry as much weight as they otherwise would.

The resulting assembly had representation biases due to its geographical selection, with the impact of self-selection on the process resulting in fewer non-voters and disproportionately middle-aged and educated participants.

According to André Blais, Kenneth Carty and Patrick Fournier, members of the assembly appeared dissatisfied with BC's current electoral system, while surveys of the public indicated it to be relatively satisfied.

Lang noted two similarities across the assembly: an interest in learning, especially about the political process, and a commitment to process once it started. She wrote, "this is likely to have contributed to the excellent working dynamic within the Assembly".

== See also ==
- Citizens' Assembly on Electoral Reform (Ontario)
- Citizens' Reference Panel
- Deliberative democracy
