= History of the Republican Party (United States) =

A red elephant, a symbol of the Republican Party

The Republican Party, also known as the Grand Old Party (GOP), is one of the two major political parties in the United States. Founded in 1854, it is the second-oldest extant political party in the United States after its main political rival, the Democratic Party.

The Republican Party emerged to combat the expansion of slavery into western territories after the passing of the Kansas–Nebraska Act. The early Republican Party consisted of northern Protestants, factory workers, professionals, businessmen, prosperous farmers, and after the Civil War also of black former slaves. The party had very little support from white Southerners at the time, who predominantly backed the Democratic Party in the Solid South, and from Irish and German Catholics, who made up a major Democratic voting bloc. While both parties adopted pro-business policies in the 19th century, the early GOP was distinguished by its support for the national banking system, the gold standard, railroads, and high tariffs. The party opposed the expansion of slavery before 1861 and led the fight to dismantle the Confederate States of America (1861–1865). While the Republican Party had almost no presence in the Southern United States at its inception, it was successful in the Northern United States, where by 1858 it had enlisted former Whigs and former Free Soil Democrats to form majorities in nearly every Northern state.

With the election of its first president, Abraham Lincoln, in 1860, the party's success in guiding the Union to victory in the Civil War, and the party's role in the abolition of slavery, the Republican Party largely dominated the national political scene until 1932. In 1912, former Republican president Theodore Roosevelt formed the Progressive Party after being rejected by the GOP and ran unsuccessfully as a third-party presidential candidate calling for social reforms. The GOP lost its congressional majorities during the Great Depression (1929–1940); under President Franklin D. Roosevelt, the Democrats formed a winning New Deal coalition that was dominant from 1932 through 1964.

The party's platform changed abruptly in the mid-1960s, a moment in which the two parties essentially traded platforms, especially with regard to civil rights and social justice plank. After the Civil Rights Act of 1964, the Voting Rights Act of 1965, and the Southern strategy, the party's core base shifted with the Southern states becoming more reliably Republican in presidential politics and the Northeastern states becoming more reliably Democratic. White voters increasingly identified with the Republican Party after the 1960s. Following the Supreme Court's 1973 decision in Roe v. Wade, the Republican Party opposed abortion in its party platform and grew its support among evangelicals. The Republican Party won five of the six presidential elections from 1968 to 1988. Two-term President Ronald Reagan, who held office from 1981 to 1989, was a transformative party leader. His conservative policies called for reduced social government spending and regulation, increased military spending, lower taxes, and a strong anti-Soviet Union foreign policy. Reagan's influence upon the party persisted into the 21st century.

In 2016, businessman and media personality Donald Trump became the party's nominee for president, won the presidency, and shifted the party further to the right. Since the 1990s, the party's support has chiefly come from the South, the Great Plains, the Mountain States, and rural areas in the North. It supports free market economics, cultural conservatism, and originalism in constitutional jurisprudence. There have been 19 Republican presidents, the most from any one political party.

Since 1980, Republicans have won seven out of the last twelve presidential elections, winning in the presidential elections of 1980 and 1984 (with Ronald Reagan, 1981–1989), 1988 (with George H. W. Bush, 1989–1993), 2000 and 2004 (with George W. Bush, 2001–2009), and 2016 and 2024 (with Donald Trump, 2017–2021 and since 2025). However, Republicans have lost the popular vote in 2000 and 2016 but won the Electoral College in both elections (with George W. Bush and Donald Trump, respectively). These were two of the four presidential elections in which Republicans lost the popular vote but won the Electoral College, the others being the presidential elections in 1876 and 1888.

== Beginnings: 1854–1861 ==
The American party system had been dominated by Whigs and Democrats for decades leading up to the Civil War. But the Whig party's increasing internal divisions had made it a party of strange bedfellows by the 1850s. An ascendant anti-slavery wing clashed with a traditionalist and increasingly pro-slavery Southern wing. These divisions came to a head in the 1852 election, and the party collapsed rapidly in the next four years.

The decisive factor in realignment was the Kansas–Nebraska Act, passed by Democrats in 1854. It opened western territory to slavery, and made the expansion of slavery the most important issue. The Act opened Kansas Territory and Nebraska Territory to slavery and future admission as slave states, thus implicitly repealing the prohibition on slavery in territory north of 36° 30′ latitude that had been part of the Missouri Compromise. This change was viewed by anti-slavery Northerners as an aggressive, expansionist maneuver by the slave-owning South. Opponents of the Act were intensely motivated and began forming a new party. Opponents created the new Republican Party, which took in many Whigs and most Free Soilers. The Party began as a coalition of anti-slavery Conscience Whigs such as Zachariah Chandler and Free Soilers such as Salmon P. Chase.

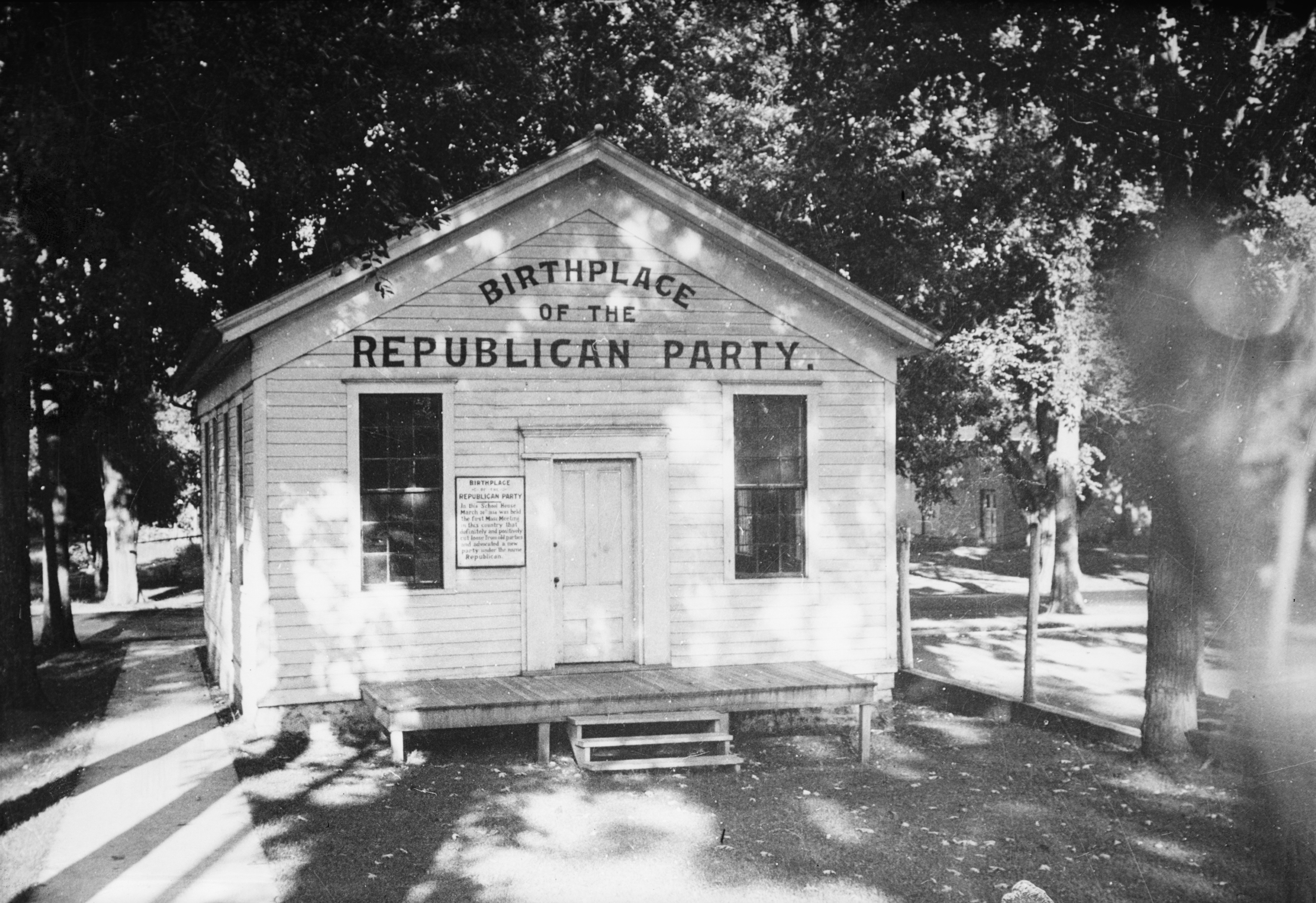
Birthplace of the Republican Party at a schoolhouse, in Ripon, Wisconsin

The first anti-Nebraska local meeting where "Republican" was suggested as a name for a new anti-slavery party was held in a Ripon, Wisconsin schoolhouse on March 20, 1854. The first statewide convention that formed a platform and nominated candidates under the Republican name was held near Jackson, Michigan, on July 6, 1854. At that convention, the party opposed the expansion of slavery into new territories and selected a statewide slate of candidates. The Midwest took the lead in forming state Republican Party tickets. Missouri had slavery and in St. Louis and areas adjacent to free states came the only efforts to organize the new party in the South.

On September 20, 1854, a "People's Convention" was held in Aurora, Illinois, at the First Congregational Church to discuss slavery. L.D. Brady was elected chairman of that first Republican convention. It was a representative gathering of 208 delegates who had been selected to form an anti-slavery party. The name "Republican" was adopted at this convention, together with a platform that formed the basis of the Lincoln-Douglas debates.

The new Republican Party envisioned modernizing the United States, emphasizing expanded banking, more railroads and factories, and giving free western land to farmers ("free soil") as opposed to letting slave owners buy up the best properties. It vigorously argued that free market labor was superior to slavery and was the very foundation of civic virtue and true republicanism; this was the "Free Soil, Free Labor, Free Men" ideology. Without using the term "containment", the Republican Party in the mid-1850s proposed a system of containing slavery. Historian James Oakes explains the strategy:

The federal government would surround the south with free states, free territories, and free waters, building what they called a 'cordon of freedom' around slavery, hemming it in until the system's internal weaknesses forced the slave states one by one to abandon slavery.

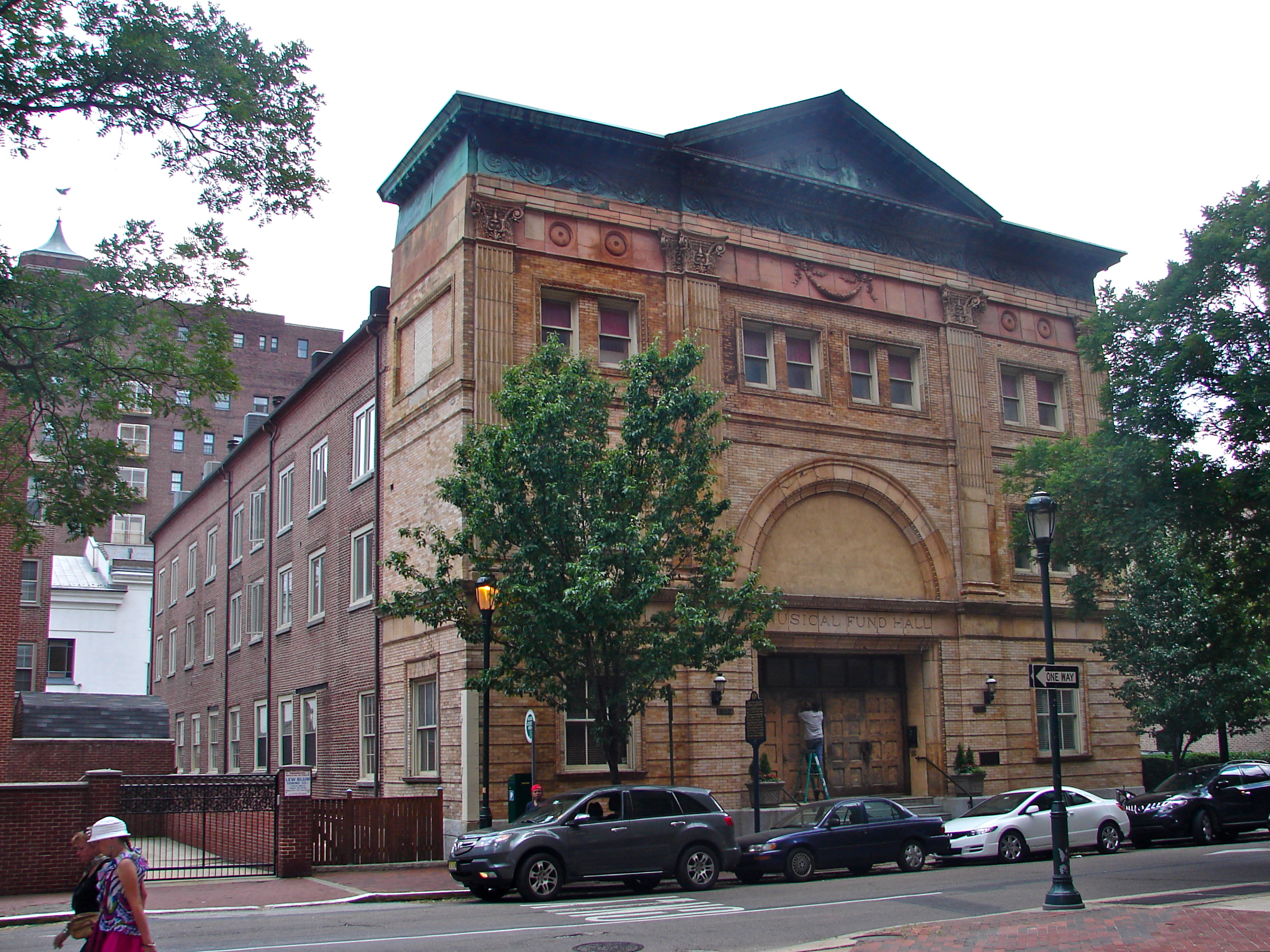
Musical Fund Hall at 808 Locust Street in Center City Philadelphia, where the first Republican nominating convention for president and vice president was held from June 17 to 19, 1856

The Republican Party launched its first national organizing convention in Pittsburgh, Pennsylvania, on February 22, 1856. This gathering elected a governing National Executive Committee and passed resolutions calling for the repeal of laws enabling slaveholding in free territories and "resistance by Constitutional means of Slavery in any Territory", defense of anti-slavery individuals in Kansas who were coming under physical attack, and a call to "resist and overthrow the present National Administration" of Franklin Pierce, "as it is identified with the progress of the Slave power to national supremacy". Its first national nominating convention was held in June 1856 in Philadelphia. John C. Frémont ran as the first Republican nominee for President in 1856 behind the slogan "Free soil, free silver, free men, Frémont and victory!" Although Frémont's bid was unsuccessful, the party showed a strong base. It dominated in New England, New York, and the northern Midwest and had a strong presence in the rest of the North. It had almost no support in the South, where it was roundly denounced in 1856–1860 as a divisive force that threatened civil war.

The Republican Party absorbed many of the previous traditions of its members, who had come from an array of political factions, including Working Men, (Note: Including Orestes Brownson of New York. There were Working Men's Parties in New York, Philadelphia, Boston, and other urban areas in the North.) Locofoco Democrats, (Note: Including William Cullen Bryant and John Bigelow, both of the New York Post.) Free Soil Democrats, (Note: Including David Wilmot of Pennsylvania, John C. Fremont of California, and Isaac P. Christiancy of Michigan.) Free Soil Whigs, (Note: Including Salmon P. Chase of Ohio, Henry Wilson of Massachusetts, and James Harlan of Iowa.) anti-slavery Know Nothings, (Note: Including Nathaniel P. Banks of Massachusetts, Henry S. Lane of Indiana, and Thaddeus Stevens of Pennsylvania.) Conscience Whigs, (Note: Including Abraham Lincoln of Illinois, Schuyler Colfax of Indiana, and William H. Seward of New York.) and Temperance Reformers of both parties. (Note: Including Whigs Neal Dow of Maine and Alvan E. Bovay of Wisconsin, and Democrats Hannibal Hamlin of Maine and John Bidwell of California.) Many Democrats who joined were rewarded with governorships, (Note: Including Nathaniel P. Banks of Massachusetts, Kinsley Bingham of Michigan, William H. Bissell of Illinois, Salmon P. Chase of Ohio, Hannibal Hamlin of Maine, Samuel J. Kirkwood of Iowa, Ralph Metcalf of New Hampshire, Lot Morrill of Maine and Alexander Randall of Wisconsin.) or seats in the U.S. Senate, (Note: Including Bingham and Hamlin, as well as James R. Doolittle of Wisconsin, John P. Hale of New Hampshire, Preston King of New York, Lyman Trumbull of Illinois and David Wilmot of Pennsylvania.) or House of Representatives. (Note: William D. Kelley of Pennsylvania.)

During the presidential campaign in 1860, at a time of escalating tension between the North and South, Abraham Lincoln addressed the harsh treatment of Republicans in the South in his famous Cooper Union speech:

[W]hen you speak of us Republicans, you do so only to denounce us as reptiles, or, at the best, as no better than outlaws. You will grant a hearing to pirates or murderers, but nothing like it to "Black Republicans." ... But you will not abide by the election of a Republican president! In that supposed event, you say, you will destroy the Union; and then, you say, the great crime of having destroyed it will be upon us! That is cool. A highwayman holds a pistol to my ear and mutters through his teeth, "Stand and deliver, or I shall kill you, and then you will be a murderer!"

=== Ethnocultural voter base ===
New England Yankees, who dominated that region and much of upstate New York and the upper Midwest, were the strongest supporters of the new party. This was especially true for the pietistic Congregationalists and Presbyterians among them and, during the war, many Methodists and Scandinavian Lutherans. The Quakers were a small, tight-knit group that was heavily Republican. By contrast, the liturgical churches (Roman Catholic, Episcopal, and German Lutheran) largely rejected the moralism of the Republican Party; most of their adherents voted Democratic.

=== Cause of realignment ===
William Gienapp argues that the great realignment of the 1850s began before the Whig party's collapse, and was caused not by politicians but by voters at the local level. The central forces were ethno-cultural, involving tensions between pietistic Protestants versus liturgical Catholics, Lutherans, and Episcopalians regarding Catholicism, prohibition, and nativism. Anti-slavery did play a role, but it was less important at first. The Know-Nothing party embodied the social forces at work, but its weak leadership could not solidify its organization, and the Republicans picked it apart. Nativism was so powerful that the Republicans could not avoid it, but they did minimize it and turn voter wrath against the threat that slave owners would buy up the good farm lands wherever slavery was allowed. The realignment was powerful because it forced voters to switch parties, as typified by the rise and fall of the Know-Nothings, the rise of the Republican Party, and the splits in the Democratic Party.

== Republican dominance: 1861–1897 ==
=== Civil War ===
Abraham Lincoln, the first Republican President (1861–1865)

The election of Lincoln as president in 1860 opened a new era of Republican dominance based in the industrial North and agricultural Midwest. The Third Party System was dominated by the Republican Party (it lost the presidency only in 1884 and 1892). Lincoln proved brilliantly successful in uniting the factions of his party to fight for the Union in the Civil War. However, he usually fought the Radical Republicans who demanded harsher measures. Led by Senator William P. Fessenden and Congressman Thaddeus Stevens, Congress took the lead in economic policy, bringing in high tariffs, a new income tax, a national banking system, paper money ("Greenbacks") and enough taxes and loans to pay for the war.

Many conservative Democrats became War Democrats who had a deep belief in American nationalism and supported the war. When Lincoln added the abolition of slavery as a war goal, the Peace Democrats were energized and carried numerous state races, especially in Connecticut, Indiana and Illinois. Democrat Horatio Seymour was elected Governor of New York and immediately became a likely presidential candidate. Most of the state Republican parties accepted the antislavery goal except Kentucky.

During the Civil War, the party passed major legislation in Congress to promote rapid modernization, including a national banking system, high tariffs, the first income tax, many excise taxes, paper money issued without backing ("greenbacks"), a huge national debt, homestead laws, railroads and aid to education and agriculture.

The Republicans denounced the peace-oriented Democrats as disloyal Copperheads and won enough War Democrats to maintain their majority in 1862. In 1864, they formed a coalition with many War Democrats as the National Union Party. Lincoln chose Democrat Andrew Johnson as his running mate and was easily re-elected. During the war, upper-middle-class men in major cities formed Union Leagues to promote and help finance the war effort. Following the 1864 elections, Radical Republicans led by Charles Sumner in the Senate and Thaddeus Stevens in the House set the agenda by demanding more aggressive action against slavery and more vengeance toward the Confederates.

=== Reconstruction (freedmen, carpetbaggers, and scalawags): 1865–1877 ===
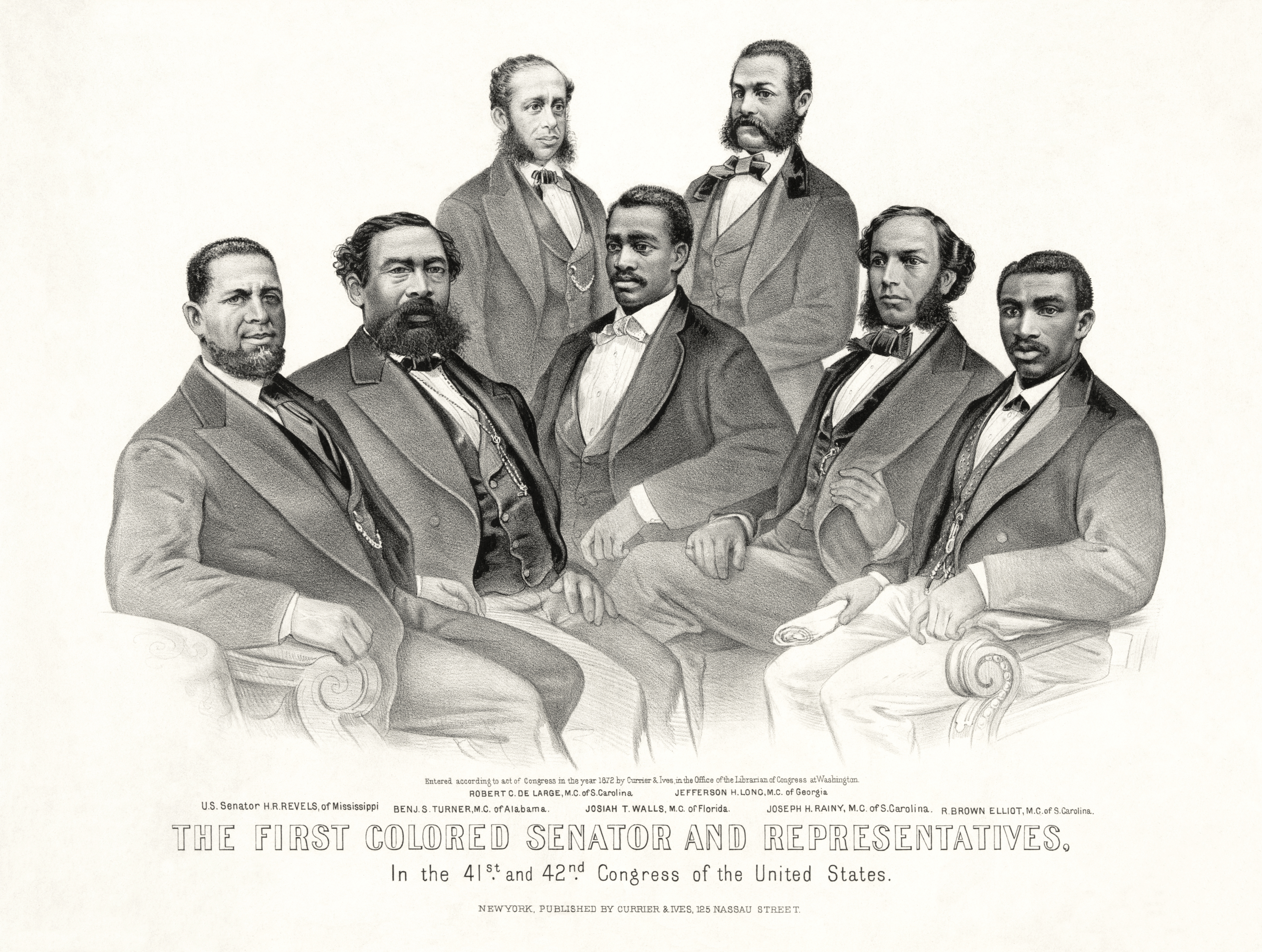
African-American members of the United States Senate and the United States House of Representatives: Sen. Hiram Revels (R-MS) and Reps. Benjamin Turner (R-AL), Robert DeLarge (R-SC), Josiah Walls (R-FL), Jefferson Long (R-GA), Joseph Rainey (R-SC), and Robert B. Elliott (R-SC), 1872

Under Republican congressional leadership, the Thirteenth Amendment to the United States Constitution – which banned slavery in the United States – passed the Senate in 1864 and the House in 1865; it was ratified in December 1865. In 1865, the Confederacy surrendered, ending the Civil War. Lincoln was assassinated in April 1865; following his death, Andrew Johnson took office as President of the United States.

During the post-Civil War Reconstruction era, there were major disagreements on the treatment of ex-Confederates and of former slaves, or freedmen. Johnson broke with the Radical Republicans and formed a loose alliance with moderate Republicans and Democrats. A showdown came in the congressional elections of 1866, in which the Radicals won a sweeping victory and took full control of Reconstruction, passing key laws over the veto. Johnson was impeached by the House, but acquitted by the Senate.

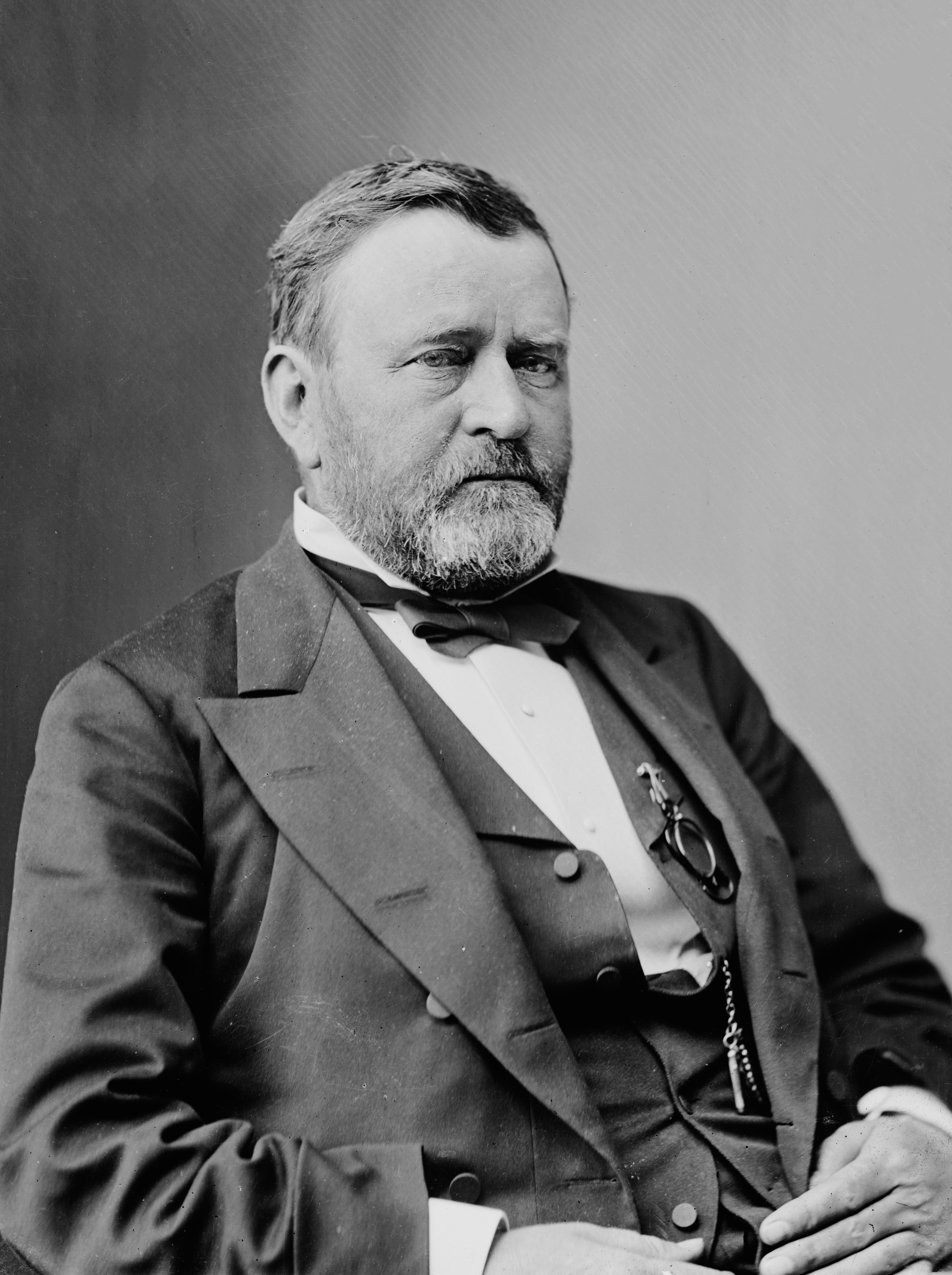
Ulysses S. Grant was the first Republican president to serve for two full terms (1869–1877).

With the election of Ulysses S. Grant in 1868, the Radicals had control of Congress and the party attempted to build a solid Republican base in the South using the votes of Freedmen, Scalawags and Carpetbaggers, supported directly by United States Army detachments. Republicans all across the South formed local clubs called Union Leagues that effectively mobilized the voters, discussed issues, and when necessary, fought off Ku Klux Klan (KKK) attacks. Thousands died on both sides.

Grant supported radical reconstruction programs in the South, the Fourteenth Amendment and equal civil and voting rights for the freedmen. Most of all he was the hero of the war veterans, who marched to his tune. The party had become so large that factionalism was inevitable; it was hastened by Grant's tolerance of high levels of corruption typified by the Whiskey Ring.

In 1869, the Republican-controlled legislature in Wyoming Territory and its Republican governor John Allen Campbell made it the first jurisdiction to grant voting rights to women. In 1875, California swore in the first Hispanic governor, Republican Romualdo Pacheco.

Many of the founders of the GOP joined the liberal movement, as did many powerful newspaper editors. They nominated Horace Greeley for president, who also gained the Democratic nomination, but the ticket was defeated in a landslide. The depression of 1873 energized the Democrats. They won control of the House and formed "Redeemer" coalitions which recaptured control of each southern state, in some cases using threats and violence.

Reconstruction came to an end when the contested election of 1876 was awarded by a special electoral commission to Republican Rutherford B. Hayes, who promised through the unofficial Compromise of 1877 to withdraw federal troops from control of the last three southern states. The region then became the Solid South, giving overwhelming majorities of its electoral votes and congressional seats to the Democrats through 1964.

Back in the late 19th century, when Senate Republicans pushed hard for civil rights, the GOP had a reputation for supporting minorities such as black people. Black people generally identified with the GOP until the 1930s. Every African American who served in the U.S. House of Representatives before 1935 and all of the African Americans who served in the Senate before 1979, were Republicans. Frederick Douglass after the Civil War and Booker T. Washington in the early 20th century were prominent Republican spokesmen. (Note: The first African American Senator, Hiram Rhodes Revels, was appointed by the Mississippi state legislature to an unexpired term in 1870. Blanche Bruce was the first African American elected to the Senate, elected by the Mississippi state legislature to a full term in 1874. Prior to the 17th Amendment in 1913, U.S. Senators were elected by state legislatures.)

Social pressure eventually forced most Scalawags to join the conservative/Democratic Redeemer coalition. A minority persisted and, starting in the 1870s, formed the "tan" half of the "Black and Tan" Republican Party, a minority in every Southern state after 1877. This divided the party into two factions: the lily-white faction, which was practically all-white; and the biracial black-and-tan faction. In several Southern states, the "Lily Whites", who sought to recruit white Democrats to the Republican Party, attempted to purge the Black and Tan faction or at least to reduce its influence. Among such "Lily White" leaders in the early 20th century, Arkansas's Wallace Townsend was the party's gubernatorial nominee in 1916 and 1920 and its veteran national GOP committeeman. The factionalism flared up in 1928 and 1952. The final victory of its opponent the lily-white faction came in 1964.

==== Moderates ====
The Moderate Republican faction were known for their loyal support of President Abraham Lincoln's war policies and opposed the more militant stances advocated by the Radical Republicans. According to historian Eric Foner, congressional leaders of the faction were James G. Blaine, John A. Bingham, William P. Fessenden, Lyman Trumbull, and John Sherman. Their constituencies were primarily residents of states outside New England, where Radical Republicanism garnered insufficient support. They included "Conservative Republicans" and the moderate Liberal Republicans, later also known as "Half-Breeds".

During the 1864 United States presidential election, amidst the backdrop of the ongoing Civil War, moderate Republicans supported merging the Republican Party with the War Democrats (Democrats who supported the continuation of the Union war effort) to form the National Union Party alliance. At the Republican National Convention (which operated under the name of the "National Union National Convention" that year), they spearheaded the effort to replace Lincoln's vice president Hannibal Hamlin with Tennessee Democrat Andrew Johnson, acting out of the belief that placing a War Democrat on the presidential ticket would solidify support to ensure Lincoln's re-election.

Moderate Republicans were less enthusiastic than Radical Republicans about Black suffrage, even though they otherwise embraced civil equality and the expansion of federal authority during the American Civil War. They were also skeptical of the lenient, conciliatory Reconstruction policies of President Andrew Johnson. Some moderate Republicans were previously Radical Republicans who became disenchanted with the alleged corruption of the latter faction. Charles Sumner, a Massachusetts senator who led Radical Republicans in the 1860s, later joined reform-minded moderates as he later opposed the corruption associated with the Grant administration.

==== Conservatives ====
Conservative Republicans was a designation applied in reference to a faction of the early Republican Party during the American Civil War and Reconstruction era which advocated a lenient, conciliatory policy towards the South in contrast to the harsher attitudes emphasized by Radical Republicans. Conservatives such as Pennsylvania senator Edgar Cowan generally opposed efforts by Radical Republicans to rebuild the Southern U.S. under an economically mobile, free-market system.

Members of the faction primarily thrived politically on antipathy towards civil rights and black suffrage. In states outside New England, Republicans such as Thurlow Weed, Oliver P. Morton, Jacob Dolson Cox, and James R. Doolittle touted their alliance with President Andrew Johnson and/or exploited racist opposition towards suffrage for political gains and to drastically reduce influence by Radical Republicans. In such states, amendments and referendums to enfranchise blacks would fail due to small fractions of Republican voters voting with Democrats to defeat them. Both Radicals and Conservatives in the Republican Party were firm and unwavering in their viewpoints. Senator William E. Chandler of New Hampshire observed: "I notice, that everyone who goes South, whether Radical or Conservative, comes back confirmed in his previous opinion."

=== Gilded Age: 1877–1891 ===
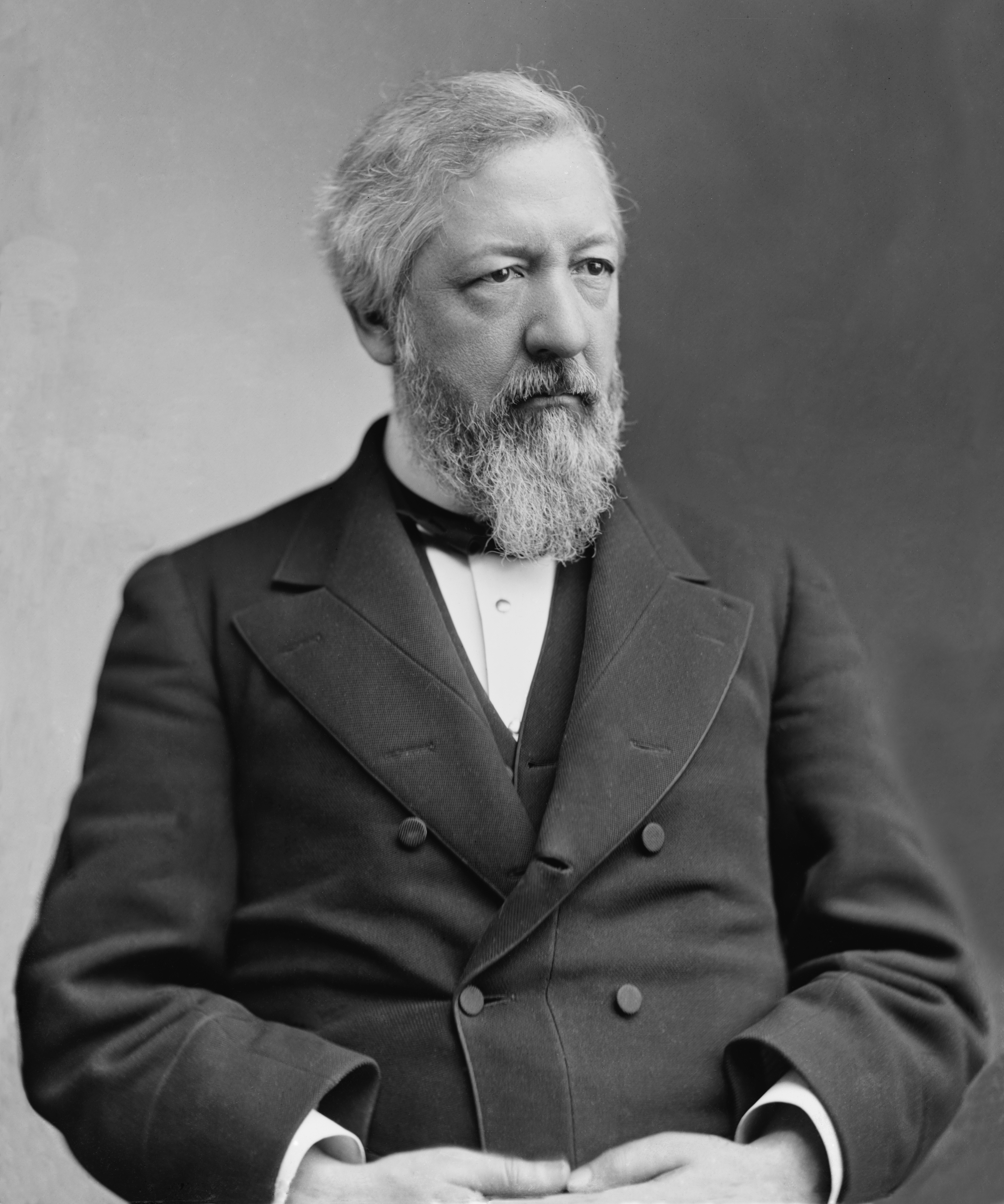
James G. Blaine, the 28th and 31st U.S. secretary of state (1881; 1889–1892)

The party split into factions in the late 1870s. The Stalwarts, followers of Senator Roscoe Conkling, defended the spoils system. The Half-Breeds, who followed Senator James G. Blaine of Maine, pushed for reform of the civil service. Upscale reformers who opposed the spoils system altogether were called "Mugwumps". In 1884, Mugwumps rejected James G. Blaine as corrupt and helped elect Democrat Grover Cleveland, though most returned to the party by 1888. In the run-up to the 1884 Republican National Convention, Mugwumps organized their forces in the swing states, especially New York and Massachusetts. After failing to block Blaine, many bolted to the Democrats, who had nominated reformer Grover Cleveland. Young Theodore Roosevelt and Henry Cabot Lodge, leading reformers, refused to bolt – an action that preserved their leadership role in the GOP.

As the Northern post-war economy boomed with industry, railroads, mines and fast-growing cities as well as prosperous agriculture, the Republicans took credit and promoted policies to keep the fast growth going. The Democratic Party was largely controlled by pro-business Bourbon Democrats until 1896. The GOP supported big business generally, the gold standard, high tariffs and generous pensions for Union veterans. However, by 1890 the Republicans had agreed to the Sherman Anti-Trust Act and the Interstate Commerce Commission in response to complaints from owners of small businesses and farmers. The high McKinley Tariff of 1890 hurt the party and the Democrats swept to a landslide in the off-year elections, even defeating McKinley himself.

Foreign affairs seldom became partisan issues (except for the annexation of Hawaii, which Republicans favored and Democrats opposed). Much more salient were cultural issues. The GOP supported the pietistic Protestants (especially the Methodists, Congregationalists, Presbyterians, and Scandinavian Lutherans) who demanded prohibition. That angered wet Republicans, especially German Americans, who broke ranks in 1890–1892, handing power to the Democrats.

Demographic trends aided the Democrats, as the German and Irish Catholic immigrants were mostly Democrats and outnumbered the British and Scandinavian Republicans. During the 1880s, presidential elections were remarkably close. The Democrats usually lost, but won with Grover Cleveland in 1884 and 1892. In the 1894 congressional elections, the GOP scored the biggest landslide in its history as Democrats were blamed for the severe economic depression 1893–1897 and the violent coal and railroad strikes of 1894.

=== Pietistic Republicans versus liturgical Democrats ===
From 1860 to 1912, the Republicans took advantage of the association of the Democrats with "Rum, Romanism, and Rebellion". Rum stood for the liquor interests and the tavernkeepers, in contrast to the GOP, which had a strong dry element. "Romanism" meant Roman Catholics, especially Irish Americans, who ran the Democratic Party in every big city and whom the Republicans denounced for political corruption. "Rebellion" stood for the Democrats of the Confederacy, who tried to break the Union in 1861; and the Democrats in the North, called "Copperheads", who sympathized with them.

Both parties cut across the class structure, with the Democrats more bottom-heavy. Cultural issues, especially prohibition and foreign language schools became important because of the sharp religious divisions in the electorate. In the North, about 50% of the voters were pietistic Protestants (Methodists, Scandinavian Lutherans, Presbyterians, Congregationalists and Disciples of Christ) who believed the government should be used to reduce social sins, such as drinking. These groups were tightly linked to the GOP.

Liturgical churches (Roman Catholics, German Lutherans, and Episcopalians) comprised over a quarter of the vote and wanted the government to stay out of the morality business. They looked to the Democratic Party for protection from pietistic moralism, especially prohibition. The prohibition debate heated up in most states over a period of decades as national prohibition was finally passed in 1919 (repealed in 1933), serving as a major issue between the mainly wet Democrats and the mainly dry GOP.

== McKinley years: 1897–1901 ==
The election of William McKinley in 1896 marked a resurgence of Republican dominance and was a realigning election. The GOP now had a decisive advantage nationwide and in the industrial states; the Democrats were left with the Solid South and mixed opportunities elsewhere. The large cities had Republican or Democratic machines. With fewer competitive states, turnout fell steadily. Blacks in the South lost the vote in general elections, but still had a voice in the Republican National Convention. New immigrants were pouring in from Eastern and Southern Europe.

The Progressive Era (or "Fourth Party System") was dominated by Republican presidents, with the sole exception of Democrat Woodrow Wilson (1913–1921). The Republican Party had a progressive element, which supported unions and the women's suffrage movement. McKinley was the first President to promote pluralism, arguing that prosperity would be shared by all ethnic and religious groups. The new Jewish element of the party favored socialism. In 1898, the first Jewish U.S. Senator elected from outside of the former Confederacy was Republican Joseph Simon of Oregon.

Progressive leaders included President Theodore Roosevelt, Senator Robert M. La Follette, Sr., Senator Hiram Johnson in California, Senator George W. Norris in Nebraska, Senator Bronson M. Cutting in New Mexico, Congresswoman Jeannette Rankin in Montana and Senator William Borah in Idaho. The first important reform mayor was Hazen S. Pingree of Detroit (1890–1897), who was elected Governor of Michigan in 1896. In New York City, the Republicans joined nonpartisan reformers to battle Tammany Hall and elected Seth Low (1902–1903). Golden Rule Jones was first elected mayor of Toledo as a Republican in 1897, but was reelected as an independent when his party refused to renominate him. Many Republican civic leaders, following the example of Mark Hanna, were active in the National Civic Federation, which promoted urban reforms and sought to avoid wasteful strikes.

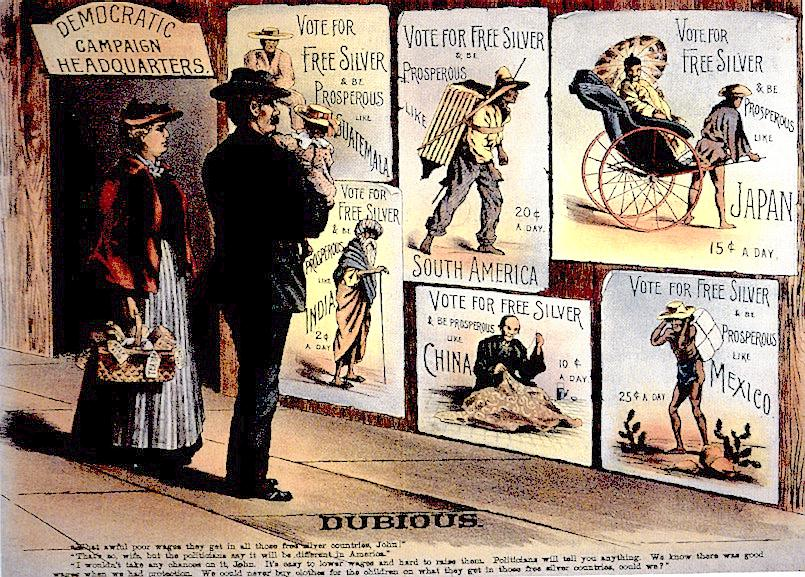
An 1896 Republican poster warns against free silver.

Protectionism was the ideological cement holding the Republican coalition together. High tariffs were used by Republicans to promise higher sales to business, higher wages to industrial workers, and higher demand for their crops to farmers. Progressive insurgents said it promoted monopoly. Democrats said it was a tax on the little man. It had greatest support in the Northeast, and greatest opposition in the South and West. The Midwest was the battle ground. McKinley promised that high tariffs would end the severe hardship caused by the Panic of 1893. He denounced William Jennings Bryan, the Democratic nominee, as a dangerous radical whose plans for "Free Silver" at 16–1 (or Bimetallism) would bankrupt the economy. McKinley relied heavily on industry officials and the middle classes for his support and cemented the Republicans as the party of business. This emphasis on business was in part reversed by Theodore Roosevelt, the presidential successor after McKinley's assassination in 1901, who engaged in trust-busting.

== Roosevelt years: 1901–1909 ==
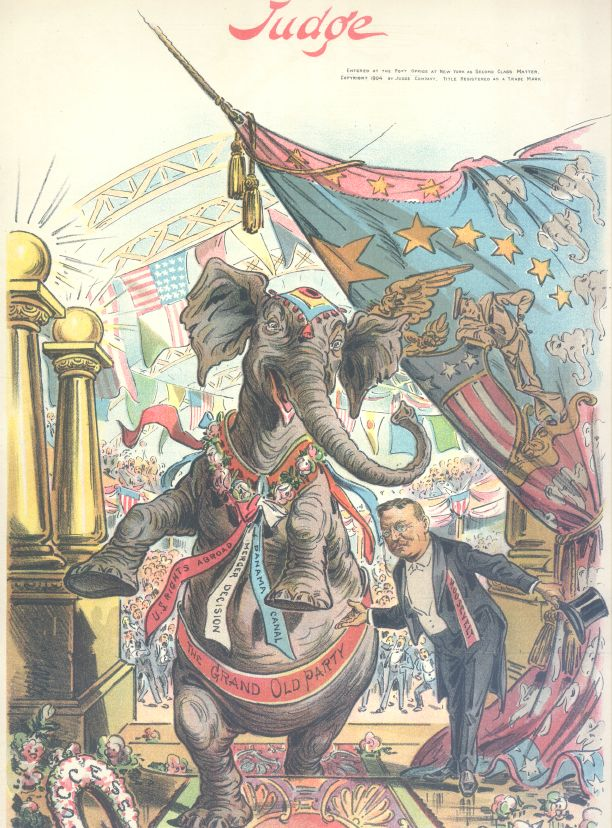
Theodore Roosevelt led the party to a landslide win in 1904

Theodore Roosevelt, who became president in 1901, had the most dynamic personality of the era. Roosevelt had to contend with men like Senator Mark Hanna, whom he outmaneuvered to gain control of the convention in 1904 that renominated him and he won after promising to continue McKinley's policies. More difficult to handle was conservative Republican House Speaker Joseph Gurney Cannon, who blocked most of Roosevelt's legislative goals in 1906–1908.

Roosevelt achieved modest legislative gains in terms of railroad legislation and pure food laws. He was more successful in Court, bringing antitrust suits that broke up the Northern Securities Company trust and Standard Oil. Roosevelt moved to the left in his last two years in office, but was unable to pass major Square Deal proposals. He did succeed in naming his successor, Secretary of War William Howard Taft, who easily defeated Bryan again in the 1908 presidential election.

By 1907, Roosevelt identified himself with the left-center of the Republican Party. He explained his balancing act:

Again and again in my public career I have had to make head against mob spirit, against the tendency of poor, ignorant and turbulent people who feel a rancorous jealousy and hatred of those who are better off. But during the last few years it has been the wealthy corruptionists of enormous fortune, and of enormous influence through their agents of the press, pulpit, colleges and public life, with whom I've had to wage bitter war."

== Taft years: 1909–1913 ==
Disagreements on tariffs were pulling the party apart. Roosevelt tried to postpone the issue, but Taft had to meet it head on in 1909 with the Payne–Aldrich Tariff Act. Eastern conservatives led by Nelson W. Aldrich wanted high tariffs on manufactured goods (especially woolens), while Midwesterners called for low tariffs. Aldrich outmaneuvered them by lowering the tariff on farm products, which outraged the farmers. The great battle over the high Payne–Aldrich Tariff Act in 1910 ripped the Republicans apart and set up the realignment in favor of the Democrats. Insurgent Midwesterners led by George Norris revolted against the conservatives led by Speaker Cannon. The Democrats won control of the House in 1910 as the GOP rift between insurgents and conservatives widened.

In 1912, Roosevelt broke with Taft, rejected Robert M. La Follette, and tried for a third term, but he was outmaneuvered by Taft and lost the nomination. The 1912 Republican National Convention turned a personal feud into an ideological split in the GOP. Politically liberal states for the first time were holding Republican primaries. Roosevelt overwhelmingly won the primaries – winning 9 out of 12 states (8 by landslide margins). Taft won only the state of Massachusetts (by a small margin); he even lost his home state of Ohio to Roosevelt. Senator Robert M. La Follette, a reformer, won two states. Through the primaries, Senator La Follette won a total of 36 delegates; President Taft won 48 delegates; and Roosevelt won 278 delegates. However 36 more conservative states did not hold primaries, but instead selected delegates via state conventions. For years Roosevelt had tried to attract Southern white Democrats to the Republican Party, and he tried to win delegates there in 1912. However Taft had the support of African American Republicans in the South, and defeated Roosevelt there. Roosevelt led many (but not most) of his delegates to bolt out of the convention and created a new party (the Progressive, or "Bull Moose" ticket), in the election of 1912. Few party leaders followed him except Hiram Johnson of California. Roosevelt had the support of many notable women reformers, including Jane Addams.

During the Progressive Era, North Carolina journalist William Garrott Brown tried to convince upscale white southerners of the wisdom of a strong early white Republican Party. He warned that a one party solid South system would negate democracy, encourage corruption, because the lack of prestige of the national level. Roosevelt was following his advice. However, in 1912, incumbent president Taft needed black Republican support in the South to defeat Roosevelt at the 1912 Republican national convention. Brown's campaign came to nothing, and he finally supported Woodrow Wilson in 1912.

== Wilson years: 1913–1921 ==
The Roosevelt-caused split in the Republican vote resulted in a decisive victory for Woodrow Wilson, temporarily interrupting the Republican era.

In 1916, Jeannette Rankin of Montana became the first woman in Congress – and indeed the first woman in any high-level government position.

== Harding, Coolidge, and Hoover years: 1921–1933 ==
The party controlled the presidency throughout the 1920s, running on a platform of opposition to the League of Nations, support for high tariffs, and promotion of business interests. Voters gave the GOP credit for the prosperity and Warren G. Harding, Calvin Coolidge and Herbert Hoover were resoundingly elected by landslides in 1920, 1924 and 1928. The breakaway efforts of Senator Robert M. La Follette in 1924 failed to stop a landslide for Coolidge and his movement fell apart. The Teapot Dome Scandal threatened to hurt the party, but Harding died and Coolidge blamed everything on him as the opposition splintered in 1924.

In 1924, the first Jewish woman elected to the U.S. House of Representatives was Republican Florence Kahn of California. In 1928, New Mexico elected the first Hispanic U.S. Senator, Republican Octaviano Larrazolo. In 1928, the Republican U.S. Senate Majority Leader, Charles Curtis of Kansas, who grew up on the Kaw Indian reservation, became the first person of significant non-European ancestry to be elected to national office, as Vice President of the United States for Herbert Hoover.

The pro-business policies of the decade seemed to produce an unprecedented prosperity until the Wall Street Crash of 1929 heralded the Great Depression. Although the party did well in large cities and among ethnic Catholics in the presidential elections of 1920 and 1924, it was unable to hold those gains in 1928. By 1932, the cities – for the first time ever – had become Democratic strongholds.

Hoover was by nature an activist and attempted to do what he could to alleviate the widespread suffering caused by the Depression, but his strict adherence to what he believed were Republican principles precluded him from establishing relief directly from the federal government. The Depression cost Hoover the presidency with the 1932 landslide election of Franklin D. Roosevelt. Roosevelt's New Deal coalition controlled American politics for most of the next three decades, an exception being the presidency of Republican Dwight Eisenhower from 1953 to 1961. The Democrats made major gains in the 1930 midterm elections, giving them congressional parity (though not control) for the first time since Wilson's presidency.

== Roosevelt years: 1933–1945 ==
Historian George H. Nash argues:

Unlike the "moderate," internationalist, largely eastern bloc of Republicans who accepted (or at least acquiesced in) some of the "Roosevelt Revolution" and the essential premises of President Truman's foreign policy, the Republican Right at heart was counterrevolutionary. Anticollectivist, anti-Communist, anti-New Deal, passionately committed to limited government, free market economics, and congressional (as opposed to executive) prerogatives, the G.O.P. conservatives were obliged from the start to wage a constant two-front war: against liberal Democrats from the outside and "me-too" Republicans from within.

The Old Right emerged in opposition to the New Deal of Franklin D. Roosevelt. Hoff says that "moderate Republicans and leftover Republican Progressives like Hoover composed the bulk of the Old Right by 1940, with a sprinkling of former members of the Farmer-Labor party, Non-Partisan League, and even a few midwestern prairie Socialists."

After Roosevelt took office in 1933, Congress acted swiftly to pass New Deal legislation. In the 1934 midterm elections, ten Republican Senators were defeated by nine Democrats and one Progressive, leaving only 25 Republicans compared to 71 Democrats. The House of Representatives was also split in a similar ratio. The "Second New Deal" was heavily criticized by the Republicans in Congress, who likened it to class warfare and socialism. The volume of legislation, as well as the inability of the Republicans to block it, soon made the opposition to Roosevelt develop into bitterness and sometimes hatred for "that man in the White House". Former President Hoover became a leading orator crusading against the New Deal, hoping unrealistically to be nominated again for president.

Most major newspaper publishers favored Republican moderate Alf Landon for president. In the nation's 15 largest cities, the newspapers that editorially endorsed Landon represented 70% of the circulation. Roosevelt won 69% of the actual voters in those cities by ignoring the press and using the radio to reach voters directly.

Roosevelt carried 46 of the 48 states thanks to traditional Democrats along with newly energized labor unions, city machines and the Works Progress Administration. The realignment creating the Fifth Party System was firmly in place. Since 1928, the GOP had lost 178 House seats, 40 Senate seats and 19 governorships, though it retained a mere 89 seats in the House and 16 in the Senate.

The black vote held for Hoover in 1932, but started moving toward Roosevelt. By 1940, the majority of northern blacks were voting Democratic. Southern blacks seldom were allowed to vote, but many became Democrats. Roosevelt made sure blacks had a share in relief programs, the wartime Army and wartime defense industry, but did not challenge segregation or the denial of voting rights in the South.

Minority parties tend to factionalize and after 1936 the GOP split into a conservative faction (dominant in the West and Midwest) and a liberal faction (dominant in the Northeast) – combined with a residual base of inherited progressive Republicanism active throughout the century. In 1936, Kansas governor Alf Landon and his liberal followers defeated the Herbert Hoover faction. Landon generally supported most New Deal programs, but carried only two states in the Roosevelt landslide. The GOP was left with only 16 senators and 88 representatives to oppose the New Deal, with Massachusetts Senator Henry Cabot Lodge Jr. as the sole victor over a Democratic incumbent.

Roosevelt alienated many conservative Democrats in 1937 by his unexpected plan to "pack" the Supreme Court via the Judiciary Reorganization Bill of 1937. Following a sharp recession that hit early in 1938, major strikes all over the country, the CIO and AFL competing with each other for membership and Roosevelt's failed efforts to radically reorganize the Supreme Court, the Democrats were in disarray. Meanwhile, the GOP was united as they had shed their weakest members in a series of defeats since 1930. Re-energized Republicans focused attention on strong fresh candidates in major states, especially Robert A. Taft the conservative from Ohio, Earl Warren the moderate who won both the Republicans and the Democratic primaries in California and Thomas E. Dewey the crusading prosecutor from New York. The GOP comeback in the 1938 United States elections was made possible by carrying 50% of the vote outside the South, giving GOP leaders confidence it had a strong base for the 1940 presidential election.

The GOP gained 75 House seats in 1938, but were still a minority. Conservative Democrats, mostly from the South, joined with Republicans led by Senator Robert A. Taft to create the conservative coalition, which dominated domestic issues in Congress until 1964.

=== World War II and its aftermath: 1939–1953 ===
From 1939 through 1941, there was a sharp debate within the GOP about support for the United Kingdom as it led the fight against a much stronger Nazi Germany. Internationalists, such as Henry Stimson and Frank Knox, wanted to support Britain and isolationists, such as Robert A. Taft and Arthur Vandenberg, strongly opposed these moves as unwise for risking a war with Germany. The America First movement was a bipartisan coalition of isolationists. In 1940, a dark horse Wendell Willkie at the last minute won over the party, the delegates and was nominated. He crusaded against the inefficiencies of the New Deal and Roosevelt's break with the strong tradition against a third term, but was ambiguous on foreign policy.

The Japanese attack on Pearl Harbor in December 1941 ended the isolationist-internationalist debate, as all factions strongly supported the war effort against Japan and Germany. The Republicans further cut the Democratic majority in the 1942 midterm elections in a low turnout episode. With wartime production creating prosperity, the conservative coalition terminated nearly all New Deal relief programs (except Social Security) as unnecessary.

Senator Robert A. Taft of Ohio represented the wing of the party that continued to oppose New Deal reforms and continued to champion non-interventionism. Governor Thomas E. Dewey of New York, represented the Northeastern wing of the party. Dewey did not reject the New Deal programs, but demanded more efficiency, more support for economic growth and less corruption. He was more willing than Taft to support Britain in 1939 and 1940. After the war the isolationists wing strenuously opposed the United Nations and was half-hearted in opposition to world communism.

As a minority party, the GOP had two wings: The left-wing supported most of the New Deal while promising to run it more efficiently and the right-wing opposed the New Deal from the beginning and managed to repeal large parts during the 1940s in cooperation with conservative Southern Democrats in the conservative coalition. Liberals, led by Dewey, dominated the Northeast while conservatives, led by Taft, dominated the Midwest. The West was split and the South was still solidly Democratic.

In 1944, a clearly frail Roosevelt defeated Dewey for his fourth consecutive term, but Dewey made a good showing that would lead to his selection as the candidate in 1948.

== Truman years: 1945–1953 ==
Roosevelt died in April 1945 and Harry S. Truman, a less liberal Democrat became president and replaced most of Roosevelt's top appointees. With the end of the war, unrest among organized labor led to many strikes in 1946 and the resulting disruptions helped the GOP. With the blunders of the Truman administration in 1945 and 1946, the slogans "Had Enough?" and "To Err is Truman" became Republican rallying cries and the GOP won control of Congress for the first time since 1928, with Joseph William Martin Jr. as Speaker of the House. The Taft–Hartley Act of 1947 was designed to balance the rights of management and labor. It was the central issue of many elections in industrial states in the 1940s to 1950s, but the unions were never able to repeal it.

In 1948, with Republicans split left and right, Truman boldly called Congress into a special session and sent it a load of liberal legislation consistent with the Dewey platform and dared them to act on it, knowing that the conservative Republicans would block action. Truman then attacked the Republican "Do-Nothing Congress" as a whipping boy for all of the nation's problems. Truman stunned Dewey and the Republicans in the election with a plurality of just over twenty-four million popular votes (out of nearly 49 million cast), but a decisive 303–189 victory in the Electoral College.

== Eisenhower years: 1953–1961 ==
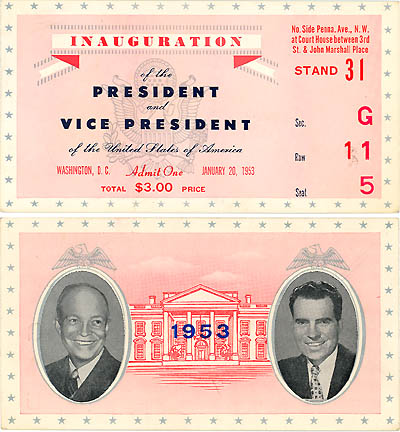
Dwight D. Eisenhower and Richard Nixon, 1953: the first Republican presidential inauguration in 24 years

In 1952, Dwight D. Eisenhower, an internationalist allied with the Dewey wing, was drafted as a GOP candidate by a small group of Republicans led by Henry Cabot Lodge Jr. in order that he challenge Taft on foreign policy issues. The two men were not far apart on domestic issues. Eisenhower's victory broke a twenty-year Democratic lock on the White House. Eisenhower did not try to roll back the New Deal, but he did expand the Social Security system and built the Interstate Highway System.

After 1945, the isolationists in the conservative wing opposed the United Nations and were half-hearted in opposition to the expansion of Cold War containment of communism around the world. A garrison state to fight communism, they believed, would mean regimentation and government controls at home. Eisenhower defeated Taft in 1952 on foreign policy issues.

To circumvent the local Republican Party apparatus mostly controlled by Taft supporters, the Eisenhower forces created a nationwide network of grass-roots clubs, "Citizens for Eisenhower". Independents and Democrats were welcome, as the group specialized in canvassing neighborhoods and holding small group meetings. Citizens for Eisenhower hoped to revitalize the GOP by expanding its activist ranks and by supporting moderate and internationalist policies. It did not endorse candidates other than Eisenhower, but he paid it little attention after he won and it failed to maintain its impressive starting momentum. Instead the conservative Republicans became energized, leading to the Barry Goldwater nomination of 1964. Long-time Republican activists viewed the newcomers with suspicion and hostility. More significantly, activism in support of Eisenhower did not translate into enthusiasm for the party cause.

Once in office, Eisenhower was not an effective party leader and Nixon increasingly took that role. Historian David Reinhard concludes that Eisenhower lacked sustained political commitment, refused to intervene in state politics, failed to understand the political uses of presidential patronage and overestimated his personal powers of persuasion and conciliation. Eisenhower's attempt in 1956 to convert the GOP to "Modern Republicanism" was his "grandest flop". It was a vague proposal with weak staffing and little financing or publicity that caused turmoil inside the local parties across the country. The GOP carried both houses of Congress in 1952 on Eisenhower's coattails, but in 1954 lost both and would not regain the Senate until 1980 nor the House until 1994. The problem, says Reinhard, was that "voters liked Ike – but not the GOP".

=== Rockefeller Republicans ===
Starting in the 1930s, a number of Northeastern Republicans took liberal positions regarding labor unions, spending and New Deal policies. They included Mayor Fiorello La Guardia in New York City, Governor Thomas E. Dewey of New York, Governor Earl Warren of California, Governor Harold Stassen of Minnesota, Senator Clifford P. Case of New Jersey, Henry Cabot Lodge Jr. of Massachusetts, Senator Prescott Bush of Connecticut (father and grandfather of the two Bush Presidents), Senator Jacob K. Javits of New York, Senator John Sherman Cooper of Kentucky, Senator George Aiken of Vermont, Governor and later Senator Mark Hatfield of Oregon, Governor William Scranton of Pennsylvania and Governor George W. Romney of Michigan.

The term "Rockefeller Republican" was used 1960–1980 to designate a faction of the party holding "moderate" views similar to those of Nelson Rockefeller, governor of New York from 1959 to 1974 and vice president under President Gerald Ford in 1974–1977. They were moderate or liberal on domestic and social policies. They favored New Deal programs, including high regulation and welfare programs. Religion was not high on their agenda, but they were strong believers in civil rights for African Americans and women, including pro-choice policy. They were supported by big business and labor unions, favoring balanced budgets and relatively high tax levels to keep the budget balanced. They sought long-term economic growth through entrepreneurship, not tax cuts. In state politics, they were strong supporters of state colleges and universities, low tuition and large research budgets. They favored infrastructure improvements such as highway projects. In foreign policy, they were internationalists and anti-communists. They felt the best way to counter communism was sponsoring economic growth (through foreign aid), maintaining a strong military, and keeping close ties to NATO. They threw their support to Eisenhower over the conservative leader Robert A. Taft in 1952. They were often called the "Eastern Establishment" by conservatives such as Barry Goldwater.

The Goldwater conservatives fought the Rockefeller Republicans in the 1960 primaries and defeated the movement in the 1964 primaries. Some moderate Republicans became Democrats like Senator Charles Goodell, Mayor John Lindsay in New York, and Chief Justice Earl Warren. President Richard Nixon adopted many moderate positions, especially regarding health care, welfare spending, environmentalism and support for the arts and humanities. After Congressman John B. Anderson of Illinois bolted the party in 1980 and ran as an independent against Reagan, this element of the party faded away. Their old strongholds in the Northeast are now mostly held by Democrats.

== Kennedy and Johnson years: 1961–1969 ==
Eisenhower was an exception to most Presidents in that he usually let Vice President Richard Nixon handle party affairs (controlling the national committee and taking the roles of chief spokesman and chief fundraiser). Nixon was narrowly defeated in the 1960 United States presidential election when Democrats, led by John F. Kennedy, successfully reassembled and reinvigorated the New Deal Coalition, which weakened the moderate wing of the Republican party.

In the wake of this loss, the conservative wing of the party made a comeback in 1964 under the leadership of Barry Goldwater, who defeated moderates and liberals such as Nelson Rockefeller, William Scranton and Henry Cabot Lodge Jr. in the Republican presidential primaries that year. Goldwater was strongly opposed to the New Deal and the United Nations, but rejected isolationism and containment, calling for an aggressive anti-communist foreign policy that was more hawkish than what was called for in 1960 and called for increased military spending and the further development of a strong nuclear arsenal. The Republican Party Platform of 1964 also moved remarkably to the right of the 1960 platform by being more expressly anti-government as opposed to simply fiscally responsible, opposing provisions of the Civil Rights Act of 1964 that dealt with public accommodations and employment discrimination, and by supporting decisive action to end the war in Vietnam that included employing economic, psychological, and political tools yet unused. In the presidential election of 1964, he was defeated by Lyndon Johnson in a landslide that brought down many senior Republican congressmen across the country. Goldwater won five states in the deep South, which was the strongest showing by a Republican presidential candidate in the South since 1872. Pollster Louis Harris concluded after the election that, of the ~27,000,000 votes cast for Goldwater, only about 6,000,000 could be considered votes of firm support. He concluded that the remainder could be considered showings of support for the "regular" Republican Party, not for a conservative, Goldwater-esque ideology.

Since Reconstruction the white South identified with the Democratic Party. Few blacks voted after 1900. The Democratic Party's dominance was so strong that the region was called the Solid South. The Republicans controlled certain parts of the Appalachian Mountains and they sometimes did compete for statewide office in the border states. By 1964, the Democratic lock on the South remained strong, but cracks began to appear. Strom Thurmond was the most prominent Democrat to switch to the Republican Party. One long-term cause was that the region was becoming more like the rest of the nation and could not long stand apart in terms of racial segregation. Modernization brought factories, businesses and larger cities as well as millions of migrants from the North, as far more people graduated from high school and college. Meanwhile, the cotton and tobacco basis of the traditional South faded away as former farmers moved to town or commuted to factory jobs. Segregation, requiring separate dining and lodging arrangements for employees, was a serious obstacle to business development.

The highly visible immediate cause of the political transition involved civil rights. The civil rights movement caused enormous controversy in the white South with many attacking it as a violation of states' rights. When segregation was outlawed by court order and by the Civil Rights acts of 1964 and 1965, a die-hard element resisted integration, led by Democratic governors Orval Faubus of Arkansas, Lester Maddox of Georgia, Ross Barnett of Mississippi and, especially George Wallace of Alabama. These populist governors appealed to a less-educated, blue-collar electorate that on economic grounds favored the Democratic Party and supported segregation.

After passage of the Civil Rights Act of 1964, most Southerners accepted the integration of most institutions (except public schools). With the old barrier to becoming a Republican removed, Southerners joined the new middle class and the Northern transplants in moving toward the Republican Party. Integration thus liberated Southern politics from the old racial issues. In 1963, the federal courts declared unconstitutional the practice of excluding African-American voters from the Democratic primaries, which had been the only elections that mattered in most of the South. Meanwhile, the newly enfranchised black voters supported Democratic candidates at the 85–90% level, a shift which further convinced many white segregationists that the Republicans were no longer the black party.

The New Deal Coalition collapsed in the mid-1960s in the face of urban riots, the Vietnam War, the opposition of many Southern Democrats to desegregation and the Civil Rights Movement and disillusionment that the New Deal could be revived by Lyndon Johnson's Great Society. In the 1966 midterm elections, the Republicans made major gains in part through a challenge to the War on Poverty. Large-scale civic unrest in the inner-city was escalating (reaching a climax in 1968) and urban white ethnics who had been an important part of the New Deal Coalition felt abandoned by the Democratic Party's concentration on racial minorities. Republican candidates ignored more popular programs, such as Medicare or the Elementary and Secondary Education Act, and focused their attacks on less popular programs. Furthermore, Republicans made an effort to avoid the stigma of negativism and elitism that had dogged them since the days the New Deal, and instead proposed well-crafted alternatives – such as their "Opportunity Crusade". The result was a major gain of 47 House seats for the GOP in the 1966 United States House of Representatives elections that put the conservative coalition of Republicans and Southern Democrats back in business.

In 1966, Edward Brooke of Massachusetts became the first African American popularly elected to the United States Senate.

=== Southern strategy ===
In American politics, the Southern strategy was a Republican Party electoral strategy to increase political support among white voters in the South by appealing to racism against African Americans. (Note: Many sources consistently describe racial appeals to white southerners against blacks as the primary force behind the southern strategy.) As the civil rights movement and dismantling of Jim Crow laws in the 1950s and 1960s visibly deepened existing racial tensions in much of the Southern United States, Republican politicians such as presidential candidates Richard Nixon and Barry Goldwater developed strategies that successfully contributed to the political realignment of many white, conservative voters in the South who had traditionally supported the Democratic Party so consistently that the voting pattern was named the Solid South. The strategy also helped to push the Republican Party much more to the right. By winning all of the South, a presidential candidate could obtain the presidency with minimal support elsewhere.

The phrase "Southern strategy" refers primarily to "top down" narratives of the political realignment of the South which suggest that Republican leaders consciously appealed to many white Southerners' racial grievances to gain their support. This top-down narrative of the Southern Strategy is generally believed to be the primary force that transformed Southern politics following the civil rights era. The scholarly consensus is that racial conservatism was critical in the post–Civil Rights Act realignment of the Republican and Democratic parties, though several aspects of this view have been debated by historians and political scientists.

The perception that the Republican Party had served as the "vehicle of white supremacy in the South", particularly during the Goldwater campaign and the presidential elections of 1968 and 1972, made it difficult for the Republican Party to win back the support of black voters in the South in later years. In 2005, Republican National Committee chairman Ken Mehlman formally apologized to the National Association for the Advancement of Colored People (NAACP) on behalf of the party for its historical exploitation of racial polarization to win elections and for ignoring the black vote.

== Nixon, Ford, and Carter years: 1969–1981 ==
Strength of parties in 1977
| Party | Republican | Democratic | Independent |
|---|---|---|---|
| Party ID (Gallup) | 22% | 47% | 31% |
| Congressmen | 181 | 354 | |
| House | 143 | 292 | |
| Senate | 38 | 62 | |
| Governors | 12 | 37 | 1 (Note: The unicameral Nebraska legislature, in fact controlled by a majority of Republicans, is technically nonpartisan.) |
| State Legislators | 2,370 | 5,128 | 55 |
| State Legislators | 31% | 68% | 1% |

After losing in 1964, the Republican Party decided to move back towards the political center for the presidential election of 1968. Richard Nixon prevailed as the presidential nominee and as an establishment, stable, and moderate figure to lead the Republican Party. On issues, the party's platform moved towards the center by affirming its support for civil rights as well as advocating government regulation and economic intervention where necessary, use of more diplomacy and negotiation in matters of international relations, and an orderly withdrawal of the United States troops in Vietnam. The platform also placed a focus on the idea of maintaining law and order as a response to the civil unrest that was widespread in the country at that time. This shift back to the center was explicitly supported by several interest groups, such as the Ripon Society, after the Republicans' conservative direction ended in their 1964 losses.

Nixon defeated both Hubert Humphrey and George C. Wallace in 1968. When the Democratic left took over their party in 1972, Nixon won reelection by carrying 49 states.

Nixon's involvement in Watergate brought disgrace and a forced resignation in 1974 and any long-term movement toward the GOP was interrupted by the scandal. Nixon's unelected vice president, Gerald Ford, succeeded him and gave him a full pardon, giving Democrats a powerful issue they used to sweep the 1974 off-year elections. Ford never fully recovered. In 1976, he barely defeated Ronald Reagan for the nomination. First Lady Betty Ford was notable for her liberal positions on social issues and for her work on breast cancer awareness following her mastectomy in 1974. The taint of Watergate and the nation's economic difficulties contributed to the election of Democrat Jimmy Carter in 1976.

== Reagan and George H.W. Bush years: 1981–1993 ==
=== The Reagan Revolution ===
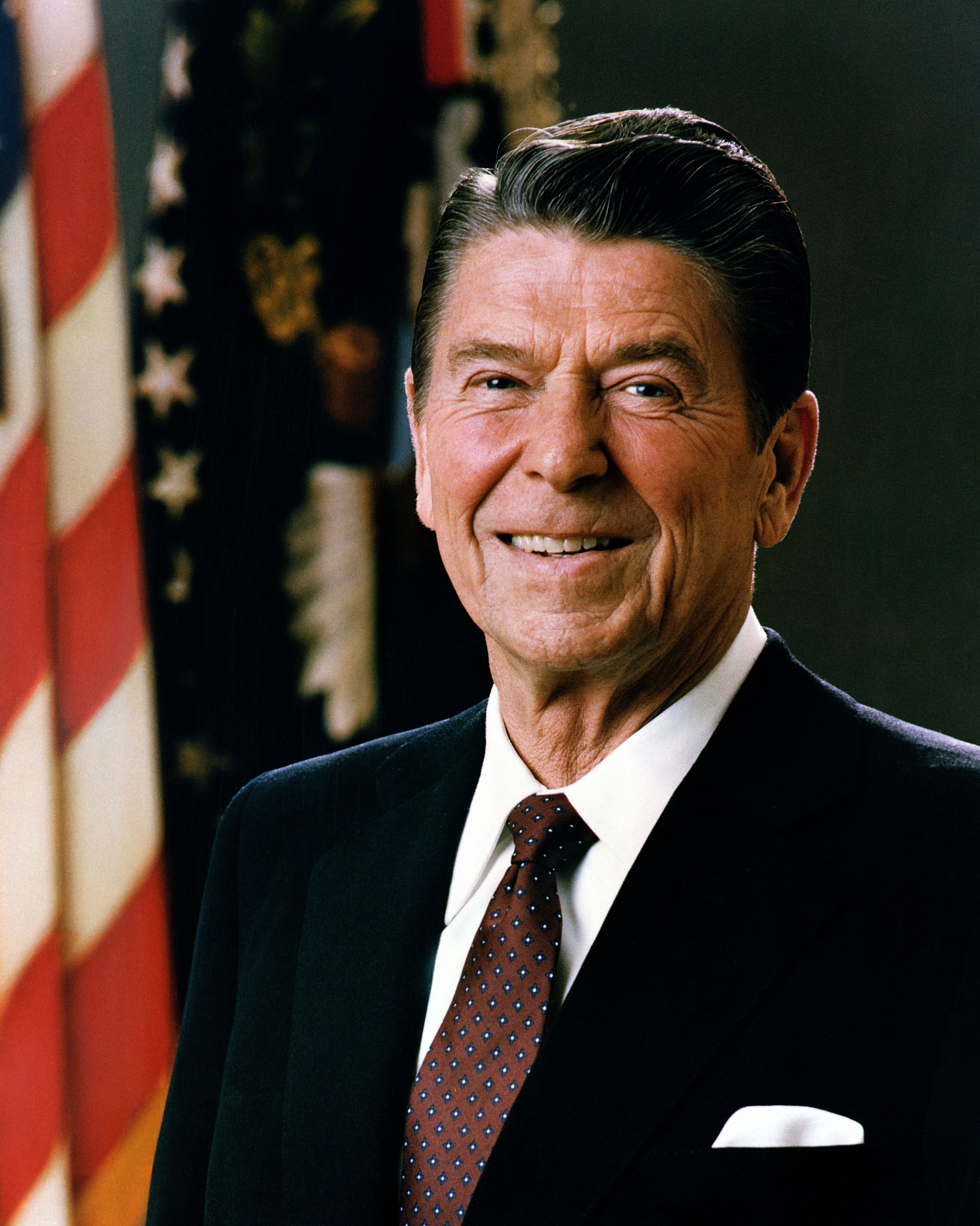
Ronald Reagan launched the "Reagan Revolution" with his election to the presidency in 1980, providing conservative influence that continued to the 2010s.

George H. W. Bush, the first sitting vice president to be elected president (rather than succeed to the presidency intra-term) since 1836, ended the Cold War during his term.

Ronald Reagan was elected president in the 1980 election by a landslide electoral vote, though he only carried 50.7 percent of the popular vote to Carter's 41% and Independent John Anderson's 6.6 percent, not predicted by most voter polling. Running on a "Peace Through Strength" platform to combat the communist threat and massive tax cuts to revitalize the economy, Reagan's strong persona proved too much for Carter. Reagan's election also gave Republicans control of the Senate for the first time since 1952, gaining 12 seats as well as 33 House seats. Voting patterns and poll result indicate that the substantial Republican victory was the consequence of poor economic performance under Carter and the Democrats and did not represent an ideological shift to the right by the electorate.

Ronald Reagan produced a major realignment with his 1980 and 1984 landslides. In 1980, the Reagan coalition was possible because of Democratic losses in most socioeconomic groups. In 1984, Reagan won nearly 60% of the popular vote and carried every state except his Democratic opponent Walter Mondale's home state of Minnesota and the District of Columbia, creating a record 525 electoral vote total (out of 538 possible votes). Even in Minnesota, Mondale won by a mere 3,761 votes, meaning Reagan came within less than 3,800 votes of winning in all fifty states.

Political commentators, trying to explain how Reagan had won by such a large margin, coined the term "Reagan Democrat" to describe a Democratic voter who had voted for Reagan in 1980 and 1984 (as well as for George H. W. Bush in 1988), producing their landslide victories. They were mostly white, blue-collar and were attracted to Reagan's social conservatism on issues such as abortion and to his hawkish foreign policy. Stan Greenberg, a Democratic pollster, concluded that Reagan Democrats no longer saw Democrats as champions of their middle class aspirations, but instead saw it as being a party working primarily for the benefit of others, especially African Americans and social liberals.

Social scientists Theodore Caplow et al. argue: "The Republican party, nationally, moved from right-center toward the center in the 1940s and 1950s, then moved right again in the 1970s and 1980s".

Reagan reoriented American politics and claimed credit in 1984 for an economic renewal – "It's morning again in America!" was the successful campaign slogan. Income taxes were slashed 25% and the upper tax rates abolished. The frustrations of stagflation were resolved under the new monetary policies of Federal Reserve Chairman Paul Volcker, as no longer did soaring inflation and recession pull the country down. Working again in bipartisan fashion, the Social Security financial crises were resolved for the next 25 years.

In foreign affairs, bipartisanship was not in evidence. Most Democrats doggedly opposed Reagan's efforts to support the contra guerrillas against the Sandinista government of Nicaragua and to support the dictatorial governments of Guatemala, Honduras and El Salvador against communist guerrilla movements. He took a hard line against the Soviet Union, alarming Democrats who wanted a nuclear freeze, but he succeeded in increasing the military budget and launching the Strategic Defense Initiative (SDI) – labeled "Star Wars" by its opponents – that the Soviets could not match.

Reagan fundamentally altered several long-standing debates in Washington, namely dealing with the Soviet threat and reviving the economy. His election saw the conservative wing of the party gain control. While reviled by liberal opponents in his day, his proponents contend his programs provided unprecedented economic growth and spurred the collapse of the Soviet Union.

Detractors of Reagan's policies note that although Reagan promised to simultaneously slash taxes, massively increase defense spending and balance the budget, by the time he left office the nation's budget deficit had tripled in his eight years in office. In 2009, Reagan's budget director noted that the "debt explosion has resulted not from big spending by the Democrats, but instead the Republican Party's embrace, about three decades ago, of the insidious doctrine that deficits don't matter if they result from tax cuts". He inspired conservatives to greater electoral victories by being reelected in a landslide against Walter Mondale in 1984, but oversaw the loss of the Senate in 1986.

When Mikhail Gorbachev came to power in Moscow, many conservative Republicans were dubious of the growing friendship between him and Reagan. Gorbachev tried to save communism in the Soviet Union first by ending the expensive arms race with America, then in 1989 by shedding the East European empire. Communism finally collapsed in the Soviet Union in 1991.

President George H. W. Bush, Reagan's successor, tried to temper feelings of triumphalism lest there be a backlash in the Soviet Union, but the palpable sense of victory in the Cold War was a triumph that Republicans felt validated the aggressive foreign policies Reagan had espoused. As Haynes Johnson, one of his harshest critics admitted, "his greatest service was in restoring the respect of Americans for themselves and their own government after the traumas of Vietnam and Watergate, the frustration of the Iran hostage crisis and a succession of seemingly failed presidencies".

=== Emergence of neoconservatives ===
Some liberal Democratic intellectuals in the 1960s and 1970s who became disenchanted with the leftward movement of their party in domestic and foreign policy became "neoconservatives" ("neocons"). A number held major appointments during the five presidential terms under Reagan and the Bushes. They played a central role in promoting and planning the 2003 invasion of Iraq. Vice President Dick Cheney and Secretary of Defense Donald Rumsfeld, while not identifying themselves as neoconservatives, listened closely to neoconservative advisers regarding foreign policy, especially the defense of Israel, the promotion of democracy in the Middle East and the buildup of the United States Armed Forces to achieve these goals. Many early neoconservative thinkers were Zionists and wrote often for Commentary, published by the American Jewish Committee. The influence of the neocons on the White House faded during the Obama years, but it remains a staple in Republican Party arsenal.

== Clinton years: 1993–2001 ==
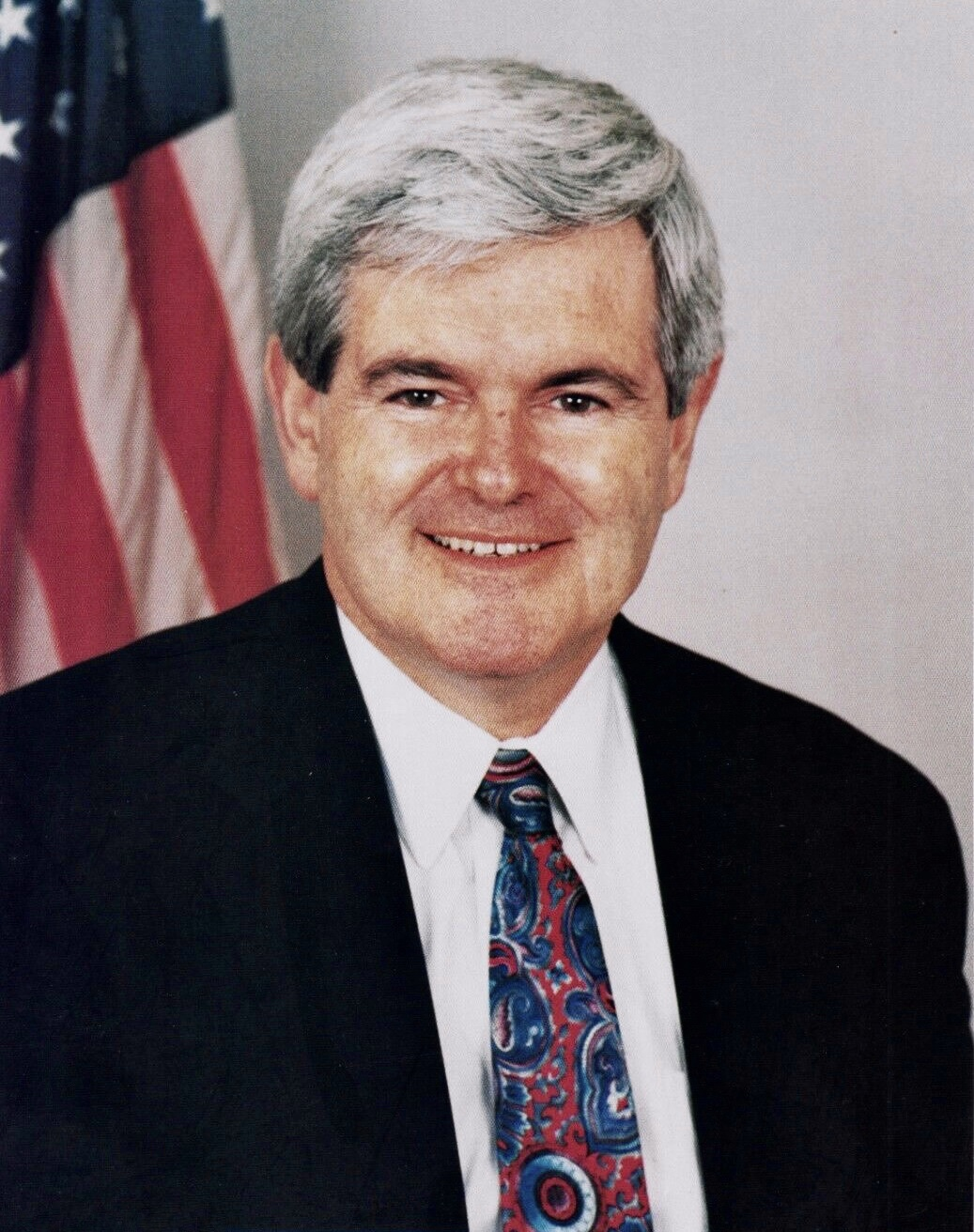
Newt Gingrich, House Speaker (1995–1999), was the most visible adversary for President Bill Clinton.

After the election of Democratic President Bill Clinton in 1992, the Republican Party, led by House Minority Whip Newt Gingrich campaigning on a "Contract with America", were elected to majorities to both Houses of Congress in the Republican Revolution of 1994. It was the first time since 1952 that the Republicans secured control of both houses of U.S. Congress, which with the exception of the Senate during 2001–2002 was retained through 2006. This capture and subsequent holding of Congress represented a major legislative turnaround, as Democrats controlled both houses of Congress for the forty years preceding 1995, with the exception of the 1981–1987 Congress in which Republicans controlled the Senate.

In 1994, Republican congressional candidates ran on a platform of major reforms of government with measures such as a balanced budget amendment and welfare reform. These measures and others formed the famous Contract with America, which represented the first effort to have a party platform in an off-year election. The Contract promised to bring all points up for a vote for the first time in history. The Republicans passed some of their proposals, but failed on others such as term limits.

Democratic President Bill Clinton opposed some of the social agenda initiatives, but he co-opted the proposals for welfare reform and a balanced federal budget. The result was a major change in the welfare system, which conservatives hailed and liberals bemoaned. The Republican-controlled House of Representatives failed to muster the two-thirds majority required to pass a Constitutional amendment to impose term limits on members of Congress.

In 1995, a budget battle with Clinton led to the brief shutdown of the federal government, an event which contributed to Clinton's victory in the 1996 election. That year, the Republicans nominated Bob Dole, who was unable to transfer his success in Senate leadership to a viable presidential campaign.

The incoming Republican majority's promise to slow the rate of government spending conflicted with the president's agenda for Medicare, education, the environment and public health, eventually leading to a temporary shutdown of the U.S. federal government. The shutdown became the longest-ever in U.S. history, ending when Clinton agreed to submit a CBO-approved balanced budget plan. Democratic leaders vigorously attacked Gingrich for the budget standoff and his public image suffered heavily.

During the 1998 midterm elections, Republicans lost five seats in the House – the worst performance in 64 years for a party that did not hold the presidency. Polls showed that Gingrich's attempt to remove President Clinton from the office was widely unpopular among Americans and Gingrich suffered much of the blame for the election loss. Facing another rebellion in the House Republican Conference, he announced on November 6, 1998, that he would not only stand down as Speaker of the House, but would leave the House as well, even declining to take his seat for an 11th term after he was handily re-elected in his home district.

== George W. Bush years: 2001–2009 ==
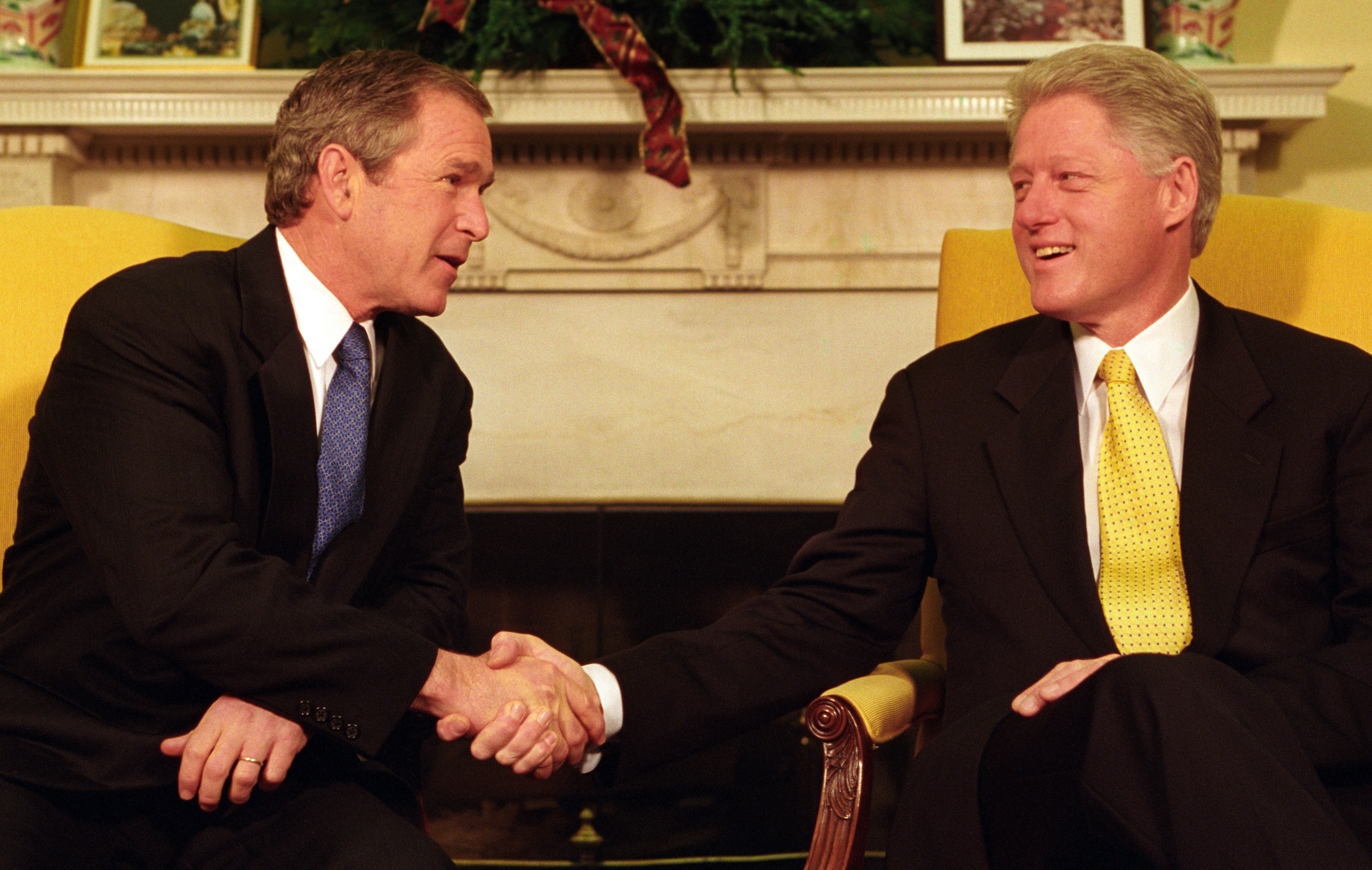
President Bill Clinton with President-elect George W. Bush after the latter's election victory in December 2000

The presidency of George W. Bush was greatly impacted by the events of the September 11th terrorist attacks.

George W. Bush, son of George H. W. Bush, won the 2000 Republican presidential nomination over Arizona Senator John McCain, former Secretary of Labor and Transportation Elizabeth Dole, and others. With his highly controversial and exceedingly narrow victory in the 2000 election against the Vice President Al Gore, the Republican Party gained control of the presidency and both houses of Congress for the first time since 1952. However, it lost control of the Senate when Vermont Senator James Jeffords left the Republican Party to become an independent in 2001 and caucused with the Democrats.

In the wake of the September 11 attacks on the United States in 2001, Bush gained widespread political support as he pursued the war on terrorism that included the invasion of Afghanistan and the invasion of Iraq. In March 2003, Bush ordered for an invasion of Iraq because of breakdown of United Nations sanctions and intelligence indicating programs to rebuild or develop new weapons of mass destruction. Bush had near-unanimous Republican support in Congress plus support from many Democratic leaders.

The Republican Party fared well in the 2002 midterm elections, solidifying its hold on the House and regaining control of the Senate in the run-up to the war in Iraq. This marked the first time since 1934 that the party in control of the White House gained seats in a midterm election in both houses of Congress (previous occasions were in 1902 and following the Civil War). Bush was renominated without opposition as the Republican candidate in the 2004 election and titled his political platform "A Safer World and a More Hopeful America".

It expressed Bush's optimism towards winning the war on terrorism, ushering in an ownership society and building an innovative economy to compete in the world. Bush was re-elected by a larger margin than in 2000, but won the smallest share ever of the popular vote for a reelected incumbent president. However, he was the first Republican candidate since 1988 to win an outright majority. In the same election that year, the Republicans gained seats in both houses of Congress and Bush told reporters: "I earned capital in the campaign, political capital, and now I intend to spend it. It is my style".

Bush announced his agenda in January 2005, but his popularity in the polls waned and his troubles mounted. Continuing troubles in Iraq as well as the disastrous government response to Hurricane Katrina led to declining popular support for Bush's policies. His campaign to add personal savings accounts to the Social Security system and make major revisions in the tax code were postponed. He succeeded in selecting conservatives to head four of the most important agencies, Condoleezza Rice as Secretary of State, Alberto Gonzales as Attorney General, John Roberts as Chief Justice of the United States and Ben Bernanke as Chairman of the Federal Reserve.

Bush failed to win conservative approval for Harriet Miers to the Supreme Court, replacing her with Samuel Alito, whom the Senate confirmed in January 2006. Bush and McCain secured additional tax cuts and blocked moves to raise taxes. Through 2006, they strongly defended his policy in Iraq, saying the Coalition was winning. They secured the renewal of the USA PATRIOT Act.

In the November 2005 off-year elections, New York City, Republican mayoral candidate Michael Bloomberg won a landslide re-election, the fourth straight Republican victory in what is otherwise a Democratic stronghold. In California, Governor Arnold Schwarzenegger failed in his effort to use the ballot initiative to enact laws the Democrats blocked in the state legislature. Scandals prompted the resignations of congressional Republicans House Majority Leader Tom DeLay, Duke Cunningham, Mark Foley and Bob Ney. In the 2006 midterm elections, the Republicans lost control of both the House of Representatives and Senate to the Democrats in what was widely interpreted as a repudiation of the administration's war policies. Exit polling suggested that corruption was a key issue for many voters. Soon after the elections, Donald Rumsfeld resigned as secretary of defense to be replaced by Robert Gates.

In the Republican leadership elections that followed the general election, Speaker Hastert did not run and Republicans chose John Boehner of Ohio for House Minority Leader. Senators chose whip Mitch McConnell of Kentucky for Senate Minority Leader and chose their former leader Trent Lott as Senate Minority Whip by one vote over Lamar Alexander, who assumed their roles in January 2007. In the October and November gubernatorial elections of 2007, Republican Bobby Jindal won election for governor of Louisiana, Republican incumbent Governor Ernie Fletcher of Kentucky lost and Republican incumbent Governor Haley Barbour of Mississippi won re-election.

With President Bush ineligible for a third term and Vice President Dick Cheney not pursuing the party's nomination, Arizona Senator John McCain quickly emerged as the Republican Party's presidential nominee, receiving President Bush's endorsement on March 6, six months before official ratification at the 2008 Republican National Convention. On August 29, Senator McCain announced Governor Sarah Palin of Alaska as his running-mate, making her the first woman on a Republican presidential ticket. McCain surged ahead of Obama in the national polls following the nomination but amid the 2008 financial crisis and the Great Recession, McCain and Palin lost the 2008 United States presidential election to Democrats Barack Obama and running mate Joe Biden.

== Obama years: 2009–2017 ==
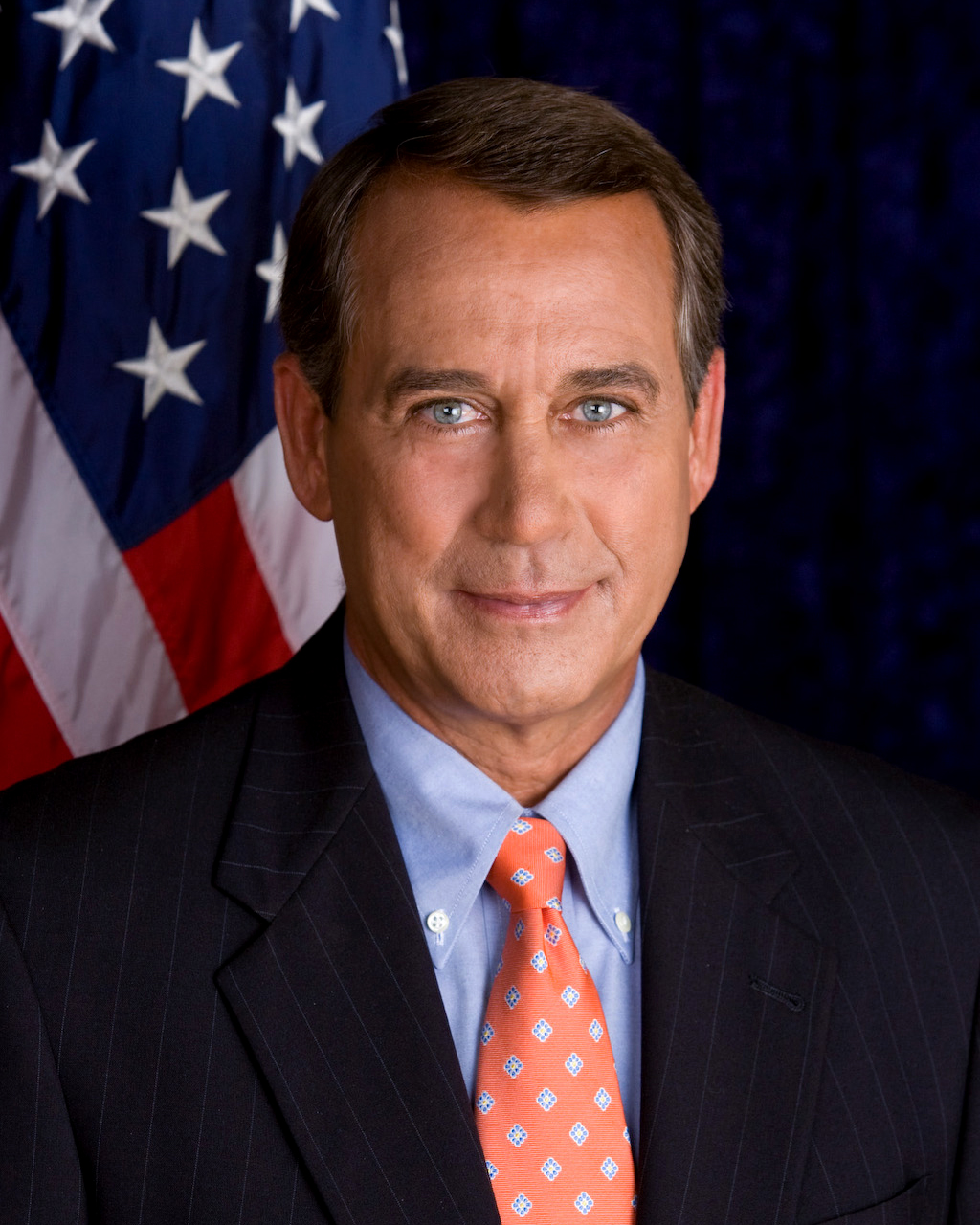
John Boehner, House Speaker (2011–2015), was the most visible adversary for President Barack Obama.

Following the 2008 elections, the Republican Party, reeling from the loss of the presidency, Congress and key state governorships, was fractured and leaderless. Michael Steele became the first black chairman of the Republican National Committee, but was a poor fundraiser and was replaced after numerous gaffes and missteps. Republicans suffered an additional loss in the Senate in April 2009, when Arlen Specter switched to the Democratic Party, depriving the GOP of a critical 41st vote to block legislation in the Senate. The seating of Al Franken several months later effectively handed the Democrats a filibuster-proof majority, but it was short-lived as the GOP took back its 41st vote when Scott Brown won a special election in Massachusetts in early 2010.

Republicans strongly opposed Obama's 2009 economic stimulus package and 2010 health care reform bill. The Tea Party movement, formed in early 2009, provided a groundswell of conservative grassroots activism to oppose policies of the Obama administration. With an expected economic recovery being criticized as sluggish, the GOP was expected to make big gains in the 2010 midterm elections. However, establishment Republicans began to see themselves at odds with Tea Party activists, who sought to run conservative candidates in primary elections to defeat the more moderate establishment-based candidates. Incumbent senators such as Bob Bennett in Utah and Lisa Murkowski in Alaska lost primary contests in their respective states.

Republicans regained control of the House in the November midterm election, with a net gain of 63 seats, the largest gain for either party since 1948. The GOP also picked up six seats in the Senate, falling short of retaking control in that chamber, and posted additional gains in state governor and legislative races. Boehner became Speaker of the House while McConnell remained as the Senate Minority Leader. In an interview with National Journal magazine about congressional Republican priorities, McConnell explained that "the single most important thing we want to achieve is for (Barack) Obama to be a one-term president".

After 2009, the voter base of the GOP changed in directions opposite from national trends. It became older and less Hispanic or Asian than the general population. In 2013, Jackie Calmes of The New York Times reported a dramatic shift in the power base of the party as it moved away from the Northeast and the West Coast and toward small-town America in the South and West. During the 2016 presidential election, the Republicans also gained significant support in the Midwest.

In a shift over a half-century, the party base has been transplanted from the industrial Northeast and urban centers to become rooted in the South and West, in towns and rural areas. In turn, Republicans are electing more populist, antitax and antigovernment conservatives who are less supportive – and even suspicious – of appeals from big business.

Big business, many Republicans believe, is often complicit with big government on taxes, spending and even regulations, to protect industry tax breaks and subsidies – "corporate welfare", in their view.

In February 2011, several freshmen Republican governors began proposing legislation that would diminish the power of public employee labor unions by removing or negatively affecting their right to collective bargaining, claiming that these changes were needed to cut state spending and balance the states' budgets. These actions sparked public-employee protests across the country. In Wisconsin, the veritable epicenter of the controversy, Governor Scott Walker fought off a labor-fueled recall election, becoming the first state governor in U.S. history to defeat a recall against him.

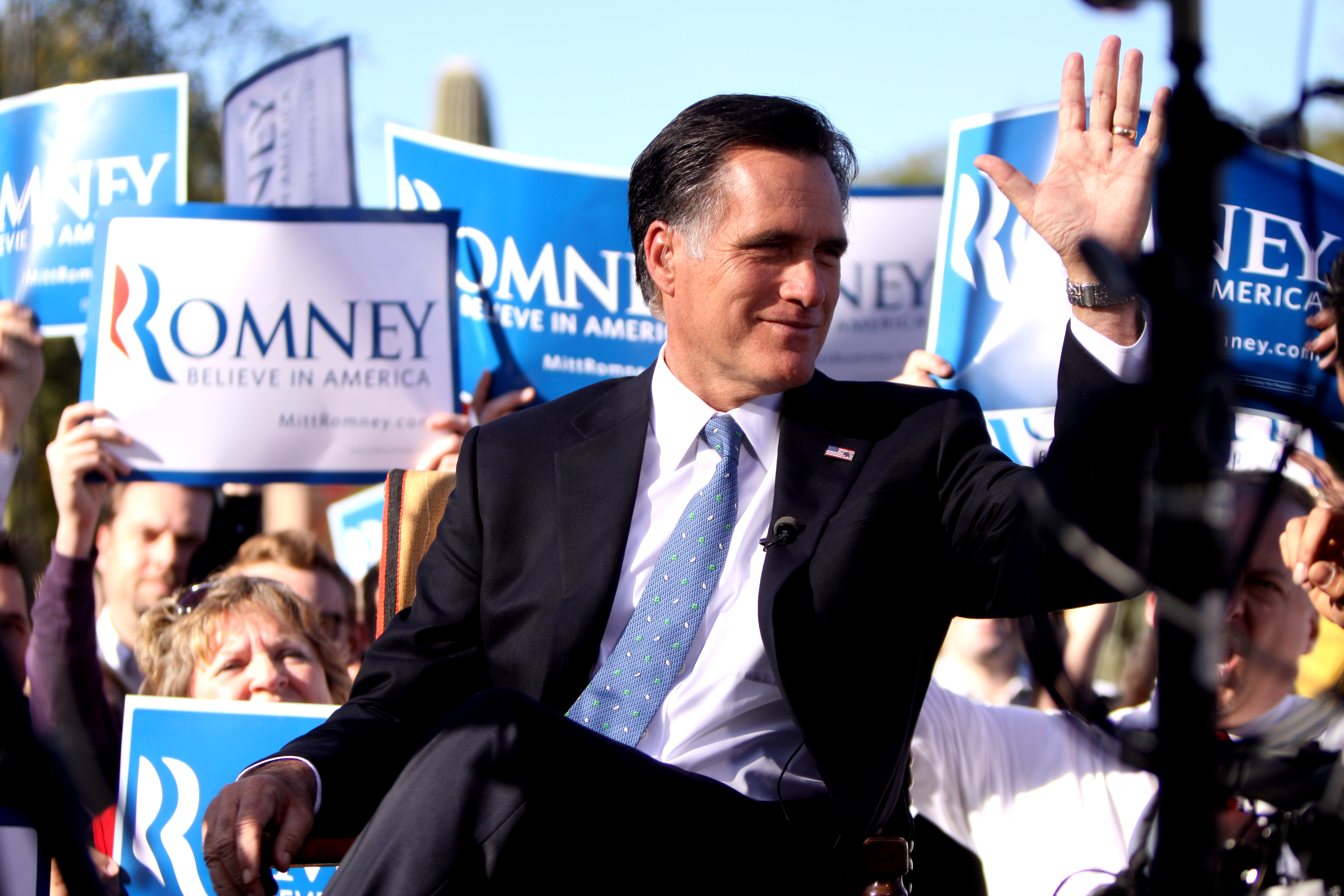
Mitt Romney campaigning in 2011 for the 2012 Republican presidential nomination

After leading a pack of minor candidates for much of 2010 and 2011, former Massachusetts Governor Mitt Romney, despite outmatching his opponents in both money and organization, struggled to hold on to his lead for the 2012 GOP nomination. As the presidential campaign season headed toward the voting stage in January 2012, one candidate after another surged past Romney, held the lead for a few weeks, then fell back. According to the RealClearPolitics 2012 polling index, five candidates at one time or another were the top choice of GOP voters: Texas Governor Rick Perry, motivational speaker Herman Cain, former Speaker Newt Gingrich, former senator Rick Santorum and Romney himself.

After losing to Santorum in Iowa and Gingrich in South Carolina, Romney racked up a number of wins in later contests, emerging as the eventual frontrunner after taking the lion's share of states and delegates in the crucial Super Tuesday contests, despite an embarrassing loss in the Colorado caucuses and near-upsets in the Michigan and Ohio primaries. Romney was nominated in August and chose Congressman Paul Ryan, a young advocate of drastic budget cuts, as his running mate. Throughout the summer polls showed a close race and Romney had a good first debate, but otherwise had trouble reaching out to ordinary voters. He lost to Obama 51% to 47% and instead of gaining in the Senate as expected, Republicans lost seats.

The party mood was glum in 2013 and one conservative analyst concluded:

It would be no exaggeration to say that the Republican Party has been in a state of panic since the defeat of Mitt Romney, not least because the election highlighted American demographic shifts and, relatedly, the party's failure to appeal to Hispanics, Asians, single women and young voters. Hence the Republican leadership's new willingness to pursue immigration reform, even if it angers the conservative base.

In March 2013, National Committee Chairman Reince Priebus gave a stinging postmortem on the GOP's failures in 2012, calling on the party to reinvent itself and to endorse immigration reform and said: "There's no one reason we lost. Our message was weak; our ground game was insufficient; we weren't inclusive; we were behind in both data and digital; and our primary and debate process needed improvement". Priebus proposed 219 reforms, including a $10 million marketing campaign to reach women, minorities and gays; a shorter, more controlled primary season; and better data collection and research facilities.

The party's official opposition to same-sex marriage came under attack. Meanwhile, social conservatives such as Rick Santorum and Mike Huckabee remained opposed to same-sex marriage and warned that evangelicals would desert if the GOP dropped the issue. Many leaders from different factions spoke out in 2013 on the need for a new immigration policy in the wake of election results showing a sharp move away from the GOP among Hispanics and Asians, but the Republicans in Congress could not agree on a program and nothing was done. Republicans in Congress forced a government shutdown in late 2013 after narrowly averting similar fiscal crises in 2011 and 2012.

The Tea Party fielded a number of anti-establishment candidates in the 2014 Republican primaries, but scored few notable wins. However, they managed to unseat House Majority Leader Eric Cantor in his Virginia primary race. GOP attacks on Obama's unpopular administration resonated with voters and the party posted major gains around the country. They regained control of the Senate and increased their majorities in the House to the highest total since 1929. They took control of governorships, state legislatures and Senate seats in nearly all Southern states, except Florida and Virginia.

Great divisions in the House GOP conference were apparent after the 2014 midterm elections, with conservative members, many of them from the right-leaning Freedom Caucus, expressing dissatisfaction with congressional leadership. John Boehner's surprise announcement in September 2015 that he would step down as Speaker sent shockwaves through the House. After Majority Leader Kevin McCarthy bowed out of the race to replace Boehner due to a lack of support, House Ways and Means Chair Paul Ryan announced he would run, with the Freedom Caucus' support. Ryan was elected Speaker on October 29.

=== 2016 elections ===
The results of the 2016 Republican presidential primaries. Donald Trump is in blue, Ted Cruz in yellow, Marco Rubio in red, John Kasich in green, and uncommitted voters in black.

The 2016 Republican presidential primaries were between businessman Donald Trump, Ted Cruz, Florida Senator Marco Rubio, Ohio Governor John Kasich, neurosurgeon Ben Carson, and former Florida Governor Jeb Bush, among others. At the start of the primaries, the highest-polling candidates were Bush and Rubio, but the nomination was ultimately won by Trump.

This represented a dramatic policy shift from traditional conservatism to an aggressively populist ideology with overtones of cultural identity politics. Numerous high-profile Republicans, including past presidential nominees like Mitt Romney, announced their opposition to Trump, even after he was the GOP nominee. Much of the party's opposition to Trump stemmed from concerns that his disdain for political correctness, his support from the ethno-nationalist alt-right, and virulent criticism of mainstream media would lose him the election and lead to significant GOP losses in other races. In one of the biggest upsets in American political history, in November 2016, following a contentious election against Hillary Clinton, Trump was elected president.

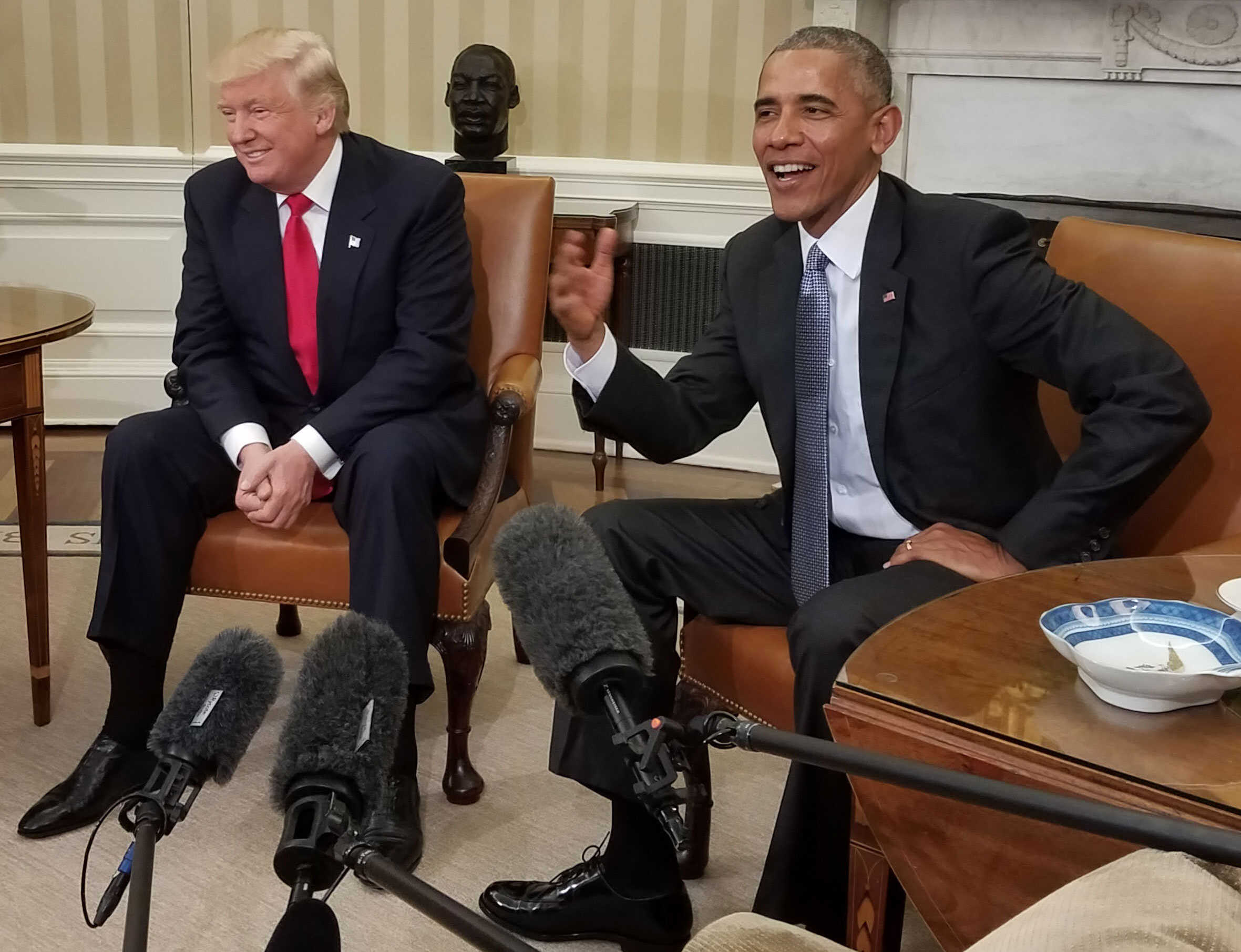
President Barack Obama with President-elect Donald Trump after the latter's first election victory in November 2016

Republicans also maintained a majority in the Senate, in the House, and amongst state governors in the 2016 elections. The Republican Party was slated to control 69 of 99 state legislative chambers in 2017 (the most it had held in history) and at least 33 governorships (the most it had held since 1922). The party took total control of the government (legislative chambers and governorships) in 25 states following the 2016 elections; this was the most states it had controlled since 1952.

The presidential election's legitimacy was disputed when the FBI and Congress began investigating if Russia interfered in the election to help Trump win. There were also accusations of collusion between Trump's campaign and Russian officials. The Mueller report concluded that Russia attempted to help Trump's campaign, but there was no evidence of "explicit" collusion found. Trump, however, "welcomed help from Russia"; in July 2016, after WikiLeaks published emails from the Democratic National Committee (DNC) – initially suspected to be obtained by Russian hackers – Trump publicly asked Russia to find emails that were deleted from Clinton's private email server that she used as Obama's Secretary of State. In 2018, the DNC emails were confirmed to be obtained by a Russian hacker or hacker group named Guccifer 2.0.

== First Trump administration: 2017–2021 ==
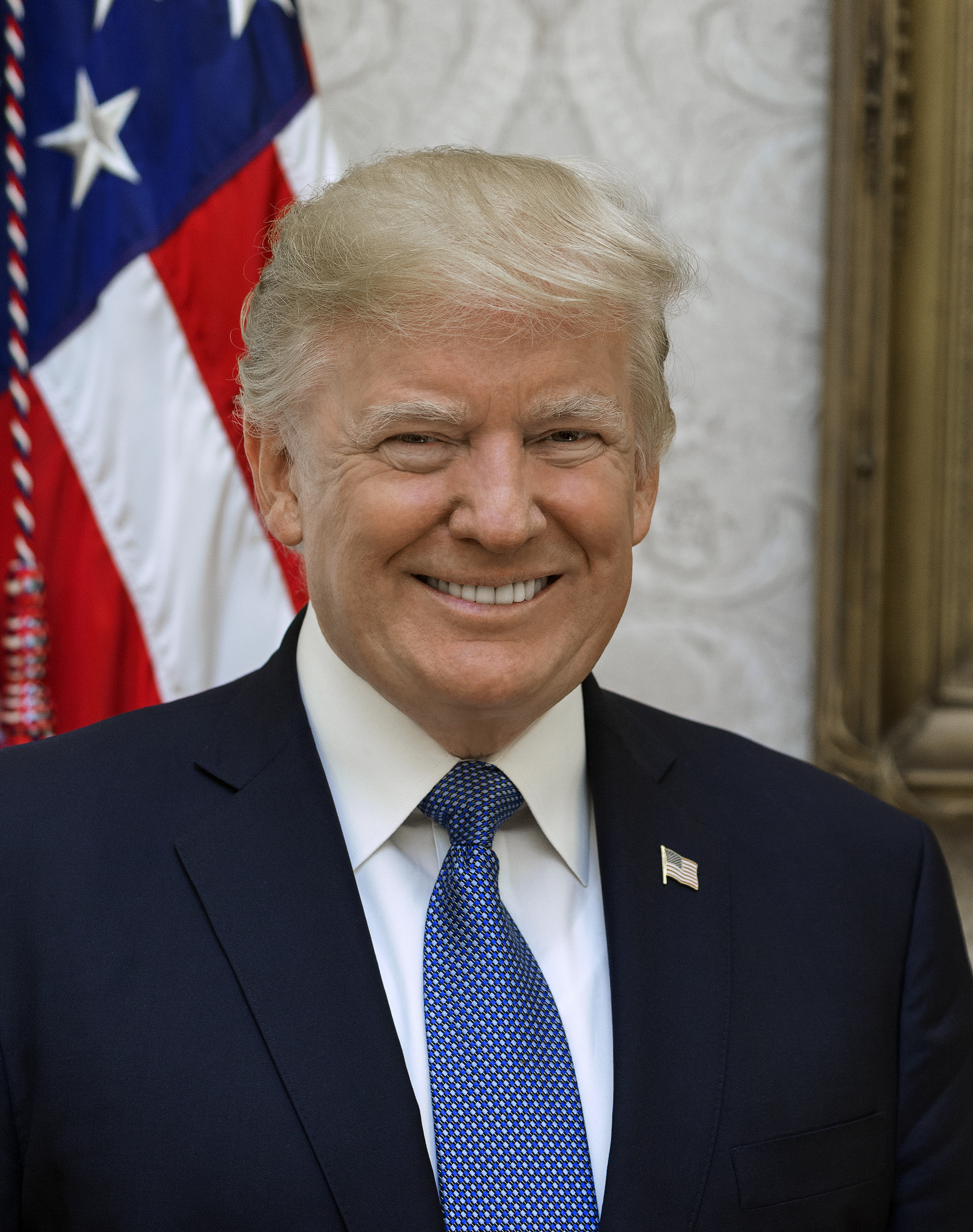
Donald Trump, 45th President of the United States

Sources differed over the extent Trump controlled and changed the Republican Party in his first term. Some called his control "complete", noting that the few dissenting "Never Trump" Republican elected officials retired or were defeated in primaries, that conservative media strongly supported him, and that his approval rating among self-identified Republican voters was extraordinarily high. His policies differed from those of his Republican predecessors in being more skeptical of free trade agreements, and isolationist and confrontational with foreign allies, yet Jeet Heer suggested that Trump's ascendancy was the "natural evolutionary product of Republican platforms and strategies". Others wrote that Trump's popularity among the Republican base did not translate into as much loyalty from other GOP politicians as expected, considering that Republican legislation and policies during the Trump administration continued to reflect traditional Republican priorities.

Trump placed restrictions on asylum seekers, expanded the wall on the U.S.-Mexico border, and banned immigration from seven Muslim-majority countries. Many of his executive orders and other actions were challenged in court. He confirmed three new Supreme Court justices (cementing a conservative majority), started a trade war with China, signed the Tax Cuts and Jobs Act, and removed the US from the Paris Agreement. In 2018, the administration separated families which were illegally immigrating to the country. After public outcry, Trump rescinded the policy. From late 2018 to early 2019, the U.S. had a federal government shutdown as Congress debated over whether or not to fund Trump's border wall. The shutdown ended with Trump not receiving any money for the border wall. In 2019, a U.S. attack caused the suicide of the leader of ISIS, Abu Bakr al-Baghdadi.

In the 2018 midterm elections, the Republican Party lost the House of Representatives for the first time since 2011 but increased their majority in the Senate.

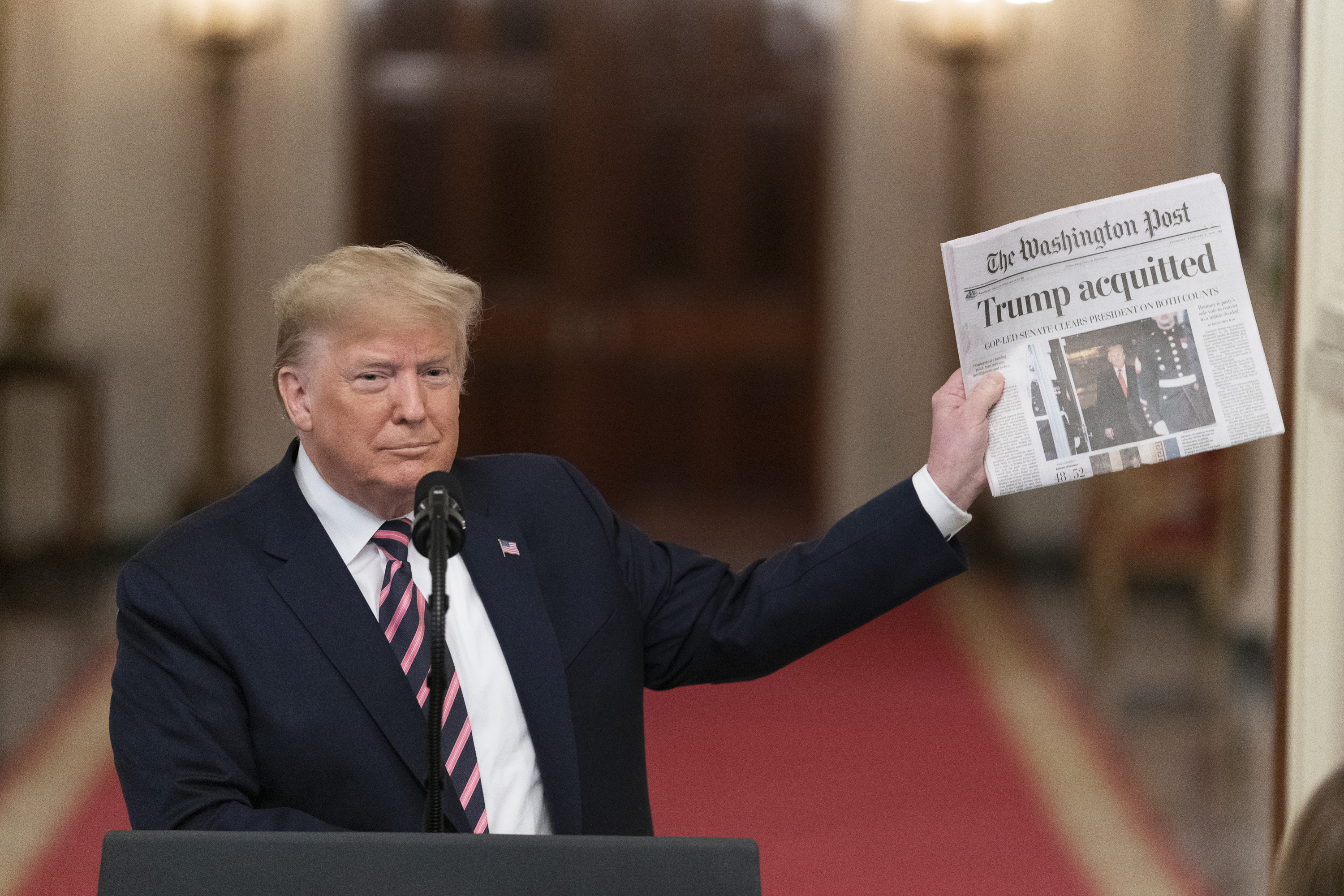
Trump holding a newspaper mentioning his acquittal by the Senate during his first impeachment trial in February 2020

In December 2019, the House voted to impeach Trump on two articles of impeachment, abuse of power and obstruction of Congress, relating to his Ukraine scandal. On February 5, 2020, Trump was acquitted during the Senate impeachment trial, when 48 Senators voted him guilty of crimes and 52 voted him not guilty. Only one Republican Senator voted to convict Trump, Mitt Romney. He was the first Senator in history to vote for conviction of a president of their own party during an impeachment trial.

In January 2020, the U.S. assassinated Iranian general Qasem Soleimani, escalating tensions with Iran. In mid-2020, as U.S. deaths kept increasing due to the COVID-19 pandemic, Republicans were "far less likely than Democrats to view COVID-19 as a major threat to public health"; against scientific consensus, Trump denied the efficacy of masks in slowing the spread of the disease. Trump continued to hold rallies despite social distancing measures commonly implemented during the pandemic. A Stanford University study found that Trump's rallies directly caused 30,000 COVID cases, including 700 deaths. After COVID-19 vaccines started being distributed nationwide, many Republicans joined the anti-vaccine movement, and the excess death rate of Republicans spiked, potentially as a direct result of this. In September 2020, a majority of Republicans believed that the QAnon conspiracy theory – which claimed that Trump was saving the world from a "deep state" cabal of rich, sex-trafficking, pedophile elites – was "mostly or partly true".

=== 2020 elections ===
In the November 2020 elections, the Republican Party lost the Presidency and the House, and Republicans and Democrats became tied in the Senate 50-50. Despite his loss, Trump initially refused to concede and attempted to overturn the election. A week after the election, 70% of Republicans believed the election was stolen from Trump. 125 House Republicans "[filed] a brief to the Supreme Court supporting a Texas lawsuit to overturn Biden's wins in Georgia, Michigan, Pennsylvania and Wisconsin." This culminated in the United States Capitol attack on January 6, 2021, as some Trump supporters tried to disrupt the Electoral College vote count.

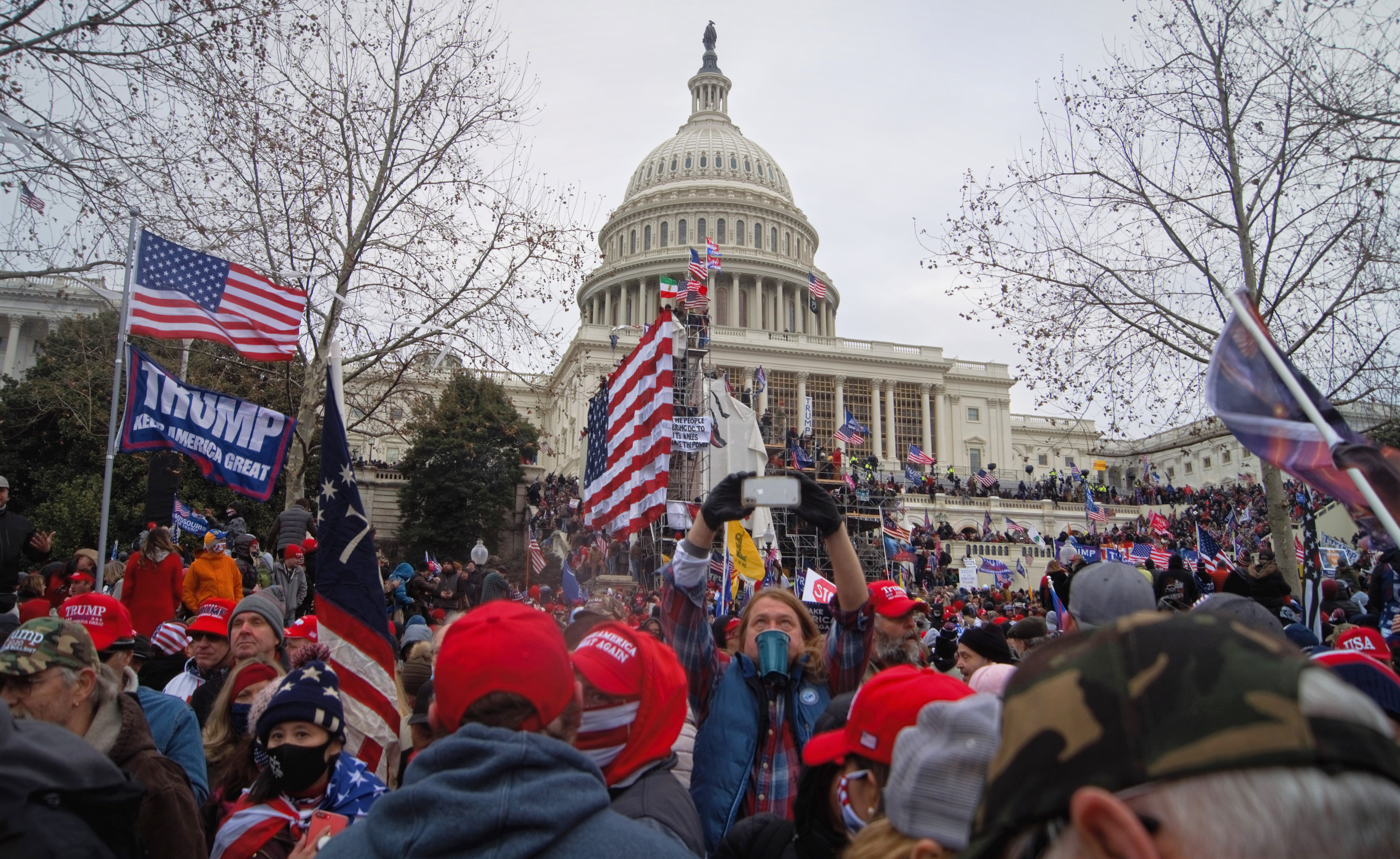
Supporters of Trump attempting to stop the counting of electoral votes by storming the United States Capitol on January 6, 2021

Hours after the attack ended, 139 of 221 House Republicans and 8 of 51 Senate Republicans voted to overturn Trump's election loss. Donald Trump conceded the following day that the Biden administration would take over the White House on January 20. Trump did not concede that he lost the election fairly, but during the United States House Select Committee on the January 6 Attack in 2022, it was shown that Trump was told he lost the election and proceeded to publicly claim he won anyways. Trump acknowledged this in 2023. Later in January 2021, Trump was again impeached by the House, this time on charges of incitement of insurrection relating to the Capitol attack.

== Biden years: 2021–2025 ==
Biden was inaugurated on January 20, 2021, though Trump did not attend, becoming the first outgoing president since Andrew Johnson in 1869 to not attend his successor's inauguration. In February 2021, Trump was acquitted of the impeachment charges in the Senate by a vote of 57 guilty to 43 not guilty, which was not the two-thirds majority required to convict. Seven Republicans joined the guilty vote. These seven faced backlash from major Republicans. After the Capitol attack, thousands of Republicans left the party, including George W. Bush administration figure Colin Powell. Two years after the attack, the number of Republicans who believed the election stolen was still at 70%. Motivated by claims of widespread election fraud, Republicans initiated an effort to make voting laws more restrictive following some temporary easing of voting laws or their enforcement in that election.

In 2021, Republican-controlled state legislatures "advanced their most conservative agenda in years" and were more aggressive in doing so than previous years. In June 2022, the Supreme Court overruled Roe v. Wade in Dobbs v. Jackson Women's Health Organization, and Republicans passed abortion bans in red states. In the 2022 midterm elections, the Democratic Party lost the House for the first time since 2018, but increased their majority in the Senate. In 2023, Republicans passed a record number of anti-LGBTQ laws in red states, mostly targeting transgender people. During the speakership election, Kevin McCarthy was voted to be House Speaker after the House had performed 15 votes, the first 14 having no successful result.

Kevin McCarthy's press conference after being removed the House speakership in October 2023

On October 3, 2023, McCarthy was removed from the speakership of the House. McCarthy's removal marked the first time in American history that a speaker of the House was removed through a motion to vacate. He was succeeded by Mike Johnson in a speakership election on October 25. The motion to vacate was not the end of the sharp intraparty conflict between the obstructionists and the institutionalists of the Party. Despite typical protocol to support incumbents in primaries, both far-right and moderate members had challengers endorsed by other sitting members of Congress. These mainly revolved around the eight Republicans who voted to vacate the Speakership, such as Matt Gaetz and Bob Good, who have recruited or endorsed more conservative challengers to swing-state moderates like Don Bacon and Tony Gonzales. McCarthy, after his retirement, leveraged his campaigning network to boost primary challengers against Gaetz, Good, Nancy Mace, and Eli Crane.

=== 2024 elections ===
In 2023, Trump began appearing in court as a defendant in multiple notable criminal trials, including alleged federal crimes, while he was campaigning for the 2024 presidential election. In May 2023, he was found liable for sexual assault. Republicans greatly supported Israel during the Gaza war, and pro-Israel groups such as AIPAC funded Republican candidates for the 2024 election. During the 2024 Republican presidential primaries, Trump faced competition from Mike Pence, former U.S. Ambassador to the United Nations Nikki Haley, Florida Governor Ron DeSantis, South Carolina Senator Tim Scott, and former New Jersey Governor Chris Christie. In March 2024, Trump became the presumptive Republican nominee.

In May 2024, Trump became the first president convicted of a crime, when he was found guilty of 34 felony counts for falsifying business documents related to his paying off of Stormy Daniels in 2016. In July, the Supreme Court ruled in Trump v. United States that presidents are somewhat immune from criminal prosecution after their presidency over "official acts" taken during their presidency, helping Trump before his election subversion trial; the trial was later dismissed by Trump-appointed judge Aileen Cannon. Also in July, Trump was injured in an assassination attempt at a rally of his in Pennsylvania.

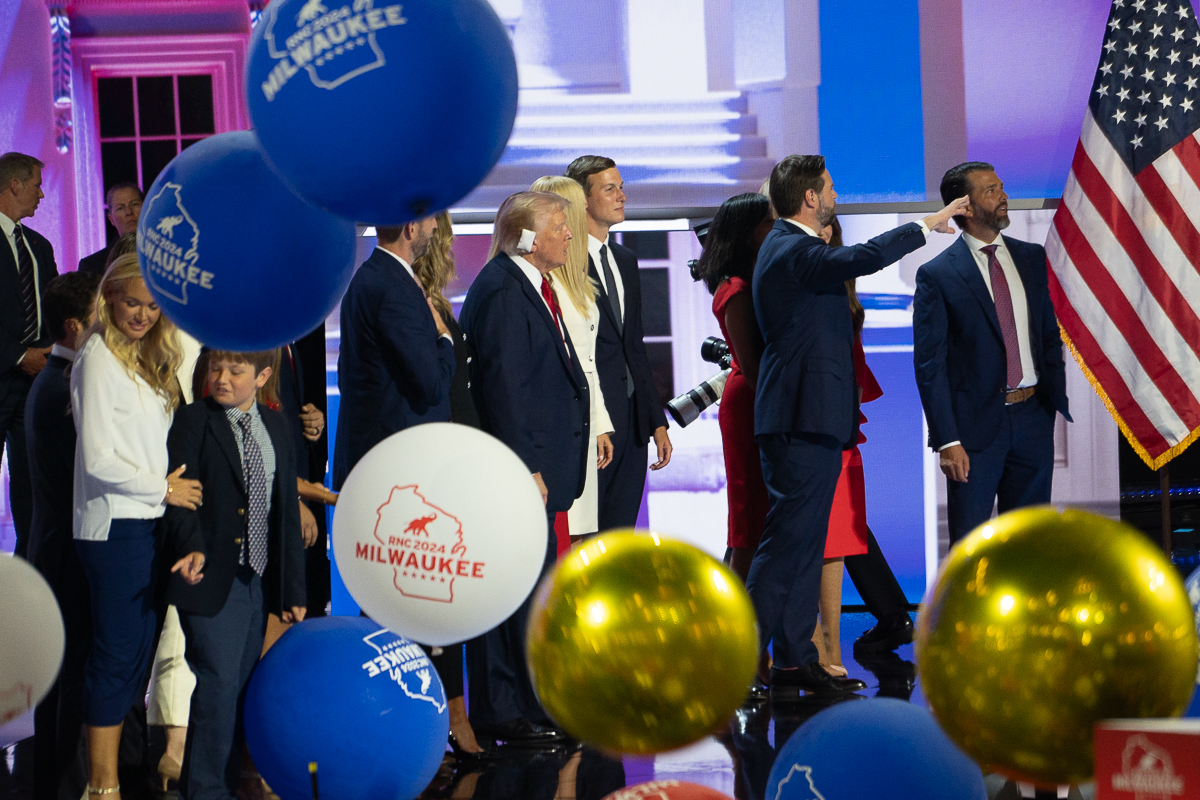
Trump, JD Vance, and their families on stage at the 2024 Republican National Convention. Trump is wearing a bandage on his ear, which was hurt during an assassination attempt on him earlier that month.

In July 2024, Trump and Biden had a televised debate. Many considered Biden to have a weak performance, as he had "verbal blanks and a weak voice". It hurt his chances of winning, although he initially stayed in the race. Later that month, Trump picked JD Vance as his vice presidential candidate on the ticket. At the 2024 Republican National Convention, Mitt Romney, Paul Ryan, George W. Bush, and Dick Cheney notably did not attend, highlighting differences between different generations of the party. Soon, Biden dropped out of the race, and endorsed for president his vice president Kamala Harris, who started her own campaign.

Much of the conversation of the election season revolved around Project 2025, the Heritage Foundation's policy plan for if a Republican candidate won the presidential election. In part, it states that the president will consider federal government jobs as political appointments, and fire those who do not support the president's agenda. Trump has denied involvement in Project 2025, while his campaign had multiple ties to it.

In August 2024, Robert F. Kennedy Jr., who had gained significant attention as a third-party candidate, ended his campaign and endorsed Trump. In September 2024, Trump and Harris participated in a televised debate; Al-Jazeera writes that Harris was the "consensus winner" among political commentators and those who were polled afterwards. Meanwhile, Trump and Vance repeatedly claimed that Haitian immigrants in Springfield, Ohio, were eating residents' pets, which was untrue. Later that month, Dick Cheney endorsed Harris.

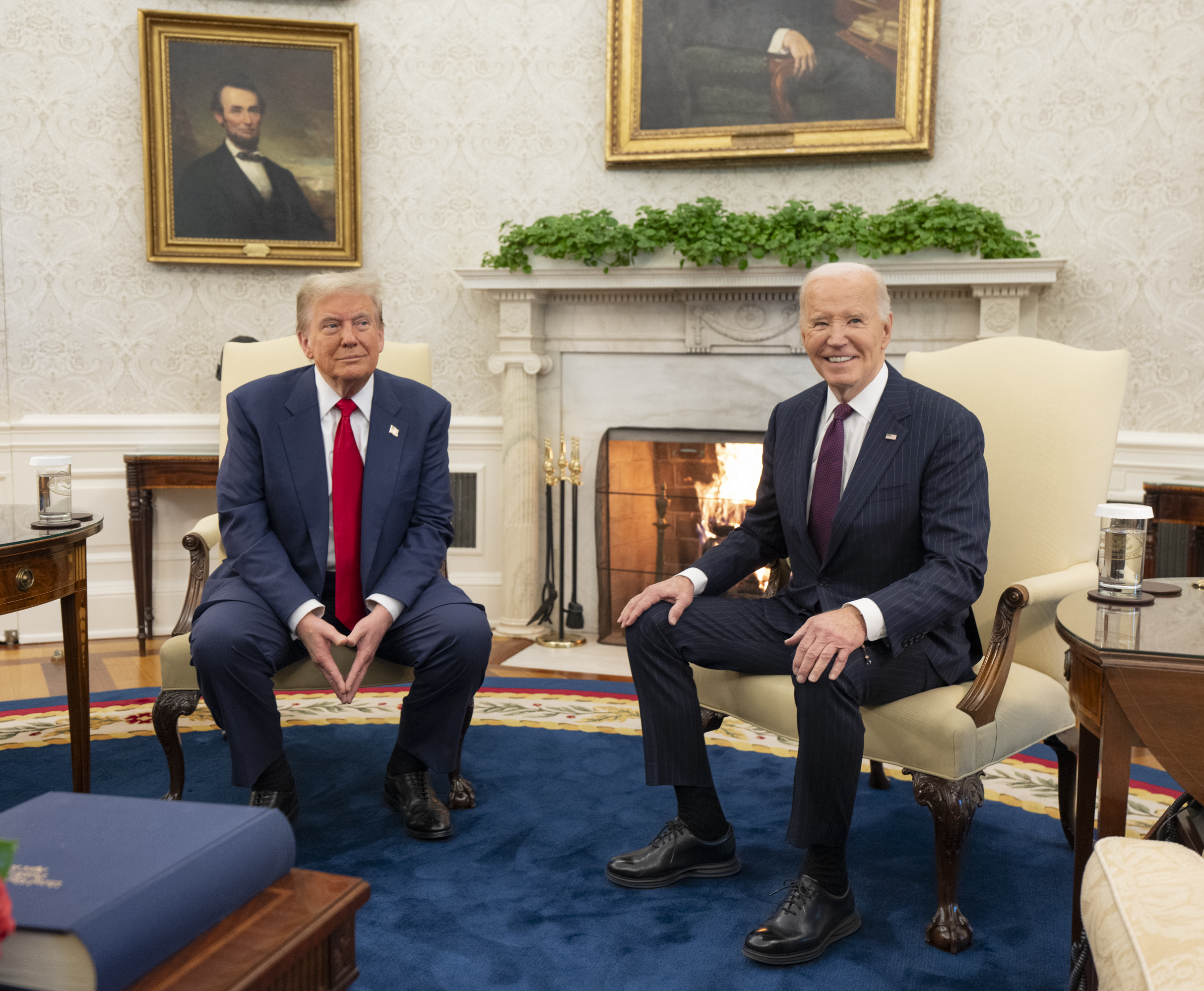
President Joe Biden with President-elect Donald Trump after the latter's second election victory in November 2024

Trump won the election, becoming the first president since Grover Cleveland to serve two non-consecutive terms. Trump had strong support among White voters without college degrees, and substantially improved his margins among young men and Hispanic voters. Trump won a majority of voters in heavily-Hispanic Miami-Dade County, Florida and South Texas. The Republicans also won the Senate and House, setting up Republican control of both chambers of Congress to begin the second Trump presidency.

== Second Trump administration: 2025–present ==
After being inaugurated as president for a second term in January 2025, Trump began firing large amounts of federal government employees, including those from the Centers for Disease Control, Environmental Protection Agency, Internal Revenue Service, National Institutes of Health, and National Park Service. He also fired officials at the Department of Justice who had worked on special counsel Jack Smith's criminal investigations into Trump during the Biden administration. Many inspectors general from multiple federal government organizations were also fired. Trump also began the mass deportation of illegal immigrants, started a trade war with Canada and Mexico by putting tariffs on their imports, attempted to freeze funding for the United States Agency for International Development, got Robert F. Kennedy Jr. confirmed as the Secretary of Health and Human Services, and announced his intent to fully or partially annex Canada, Greenland, and Panama. He has weakened legal protections for, and put legal restrictions on, transgender people.

== See also ==
- History of conservatism in the United States
- Republican National Convention
- List of Republican National Conventions
- Political positions of the Republican Party (United States)

United States politics

- American election campaigns in the 19th century
- History of the Democratic Party (United States)
- List of United States political catchphrases, slogans and rhetoric

== Sources ==
- Black, Earl; Black, Merle (1992). The Vital South: How Presidents Are Elected. Harvard University Press. ISBN 0674941306.
- Foner, Eric (1988). Reconstruction: America's Unfinished Revolution, 1863–1877. New York: Harper & Row.
