= 1966 United States elections =

- ← 1964 1965 1966 1967 1968 → Midterm elections
- Election day: November 8
- Incumbent president: ▌Lyndon B. Johnson (D)
- Next Congress: 90th

Senate elections
- Overall control: Democratic hold
- Seats contested: 35 of 100 seats (33 Class 2 seats + 2 special elections)
- Net seat change: Republican +3
- 1966 Senate election results Democratic hold Republican hold Republican gain

House elections
- Overall control: Democratic hold
- Seats contested: All 435 voting seats
- Popular vote margin: Democratic +1.7%
- Net seat change: Republican +47
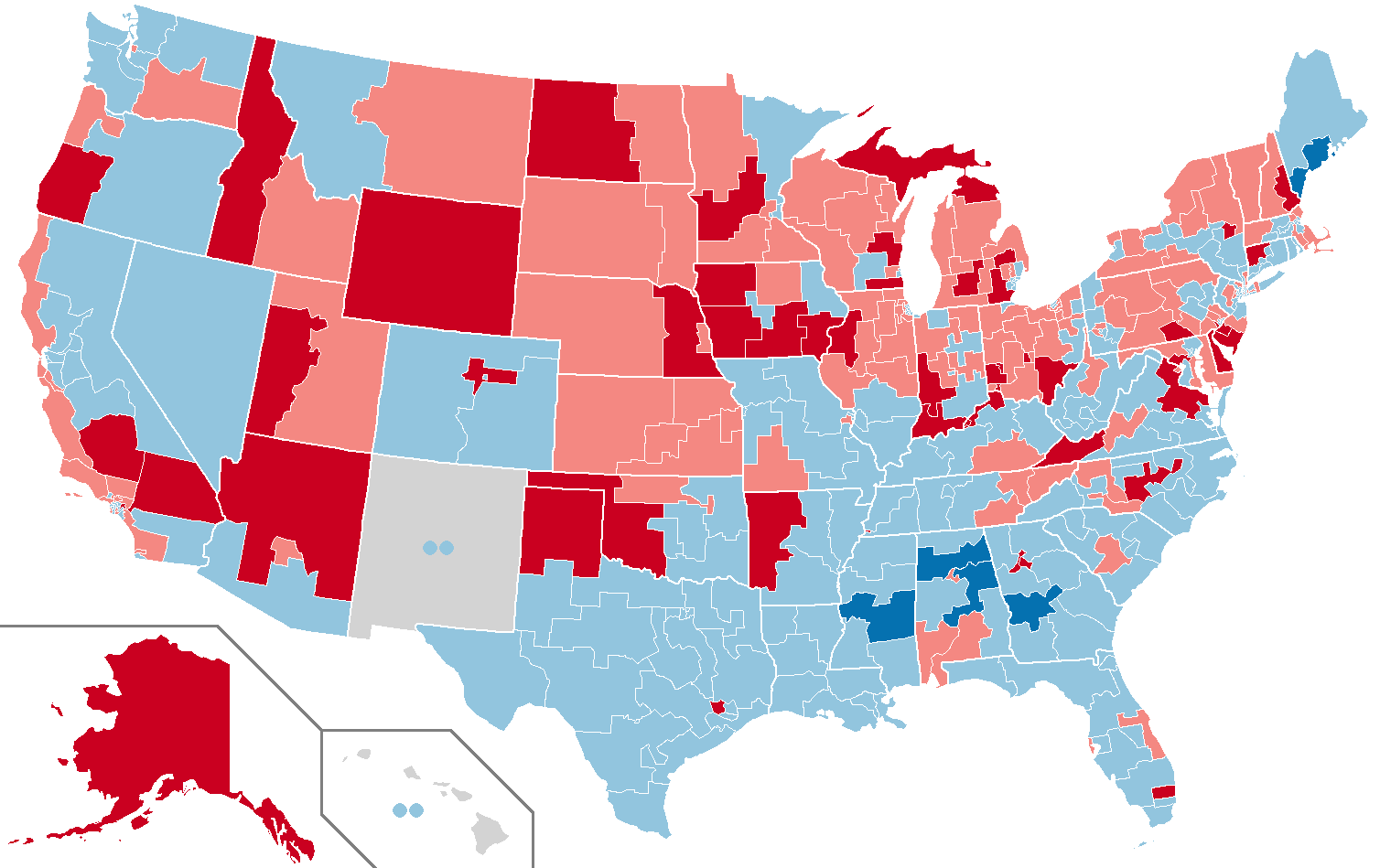
- 1966 House of Representatives election results Democratic hold Democratic gain Republican hold Republican gain

Gubernatorial elections
- Seats contested: 35
- Net seat change: Republican +8
- 1966 gubernatorial election results Democratic hold Democratic gain Republican hold Republican gain

Elections were held on November 8, 1966, and elected the members of the 90th United States Congress. The election was held in the middle of Democratic President Lyndon B. Johnson's second and only full term, and during the Vietnam War. Johnson's Democrats lost forty-seven seats to the Republican Party in the House of Representatives. The Democrats also lost three seats in the U.S. Senate to the Republicans. Despite their losses, the Democrats retained control of both chambers of Congress. Republicans won a large victory in the gubernatorial elections, with a net gain of seven seats. This was the first election held after the passage of the Voting Rights Act of 1965, which led to a surge in African-American voter participation.

The Republican Party had risked sliding into irrelevance after the disastrous 1964 elections, and the GOP's victory in this election invigorated the party, strengthening the conservative coalition. The GOP made inroads into the South and among blue collar workers, foreshadowing Nixon's Southern strategy and the rise of Reagan Democrats, respectively. Among the newly elected Republicans were future presidents Ronald Reagan (who soon became the leader of the right wing of the Republican Party) as governor of California and George H. W. Bush as a representative from Texas, and future vice president Spiro Agnew as Governor of Maryland. The election also helped establish former vice president Richard Nixon (who campaigned heavily for Republicans) as a frontrunner for the 1968 Republican nomination. President Johnson was mostly unable to pass major expansions to the Great Society in the 90th Congress.

After the landslide reelection victory of President Johnson in 1964, the Democratic Congress had passed a raft of liberal legislation. Labor union leaders claimed credit for the widest range of liberal laws since the New Deal era, including the Civil Rights Act of 1964; the Voting Rights Act of 1965; the War on Poverty; aid to cities and education; increased Social Security benefits; and Medicare for the elderly. The 1966 elections were an unexpected disaster, with defeats for many of the more liberal Democrats. According to Alan Draper, the AFL-CIO Committee on Political Action (COPE) was the main electioneering unit of the labor movement. It ignored the white backlash against civil rights, which had become a main Republican attack point. The COPE assumed falsely that union members were interested in issues of greatest salience to union leadership, but polls showed this was not true. The members were much more conservative. The younger ones were much more concerned about taxes and crime, and the older ones had not overcome racial biases. Furthermore a new issue – the War in Vietnam – was bitterly splitting the New Deal coalition into hawks (led by Johnson and Vice-President Hubert Humphrey) and doves (led by Senators Eugene McCarthy and Robert Kennedy).

== See also ==
- 1966 United States House of Representatives elections
- 1966 United States Senate elections
- 1966 United States gubernatorial elections
