= Religion and politics in the United States =

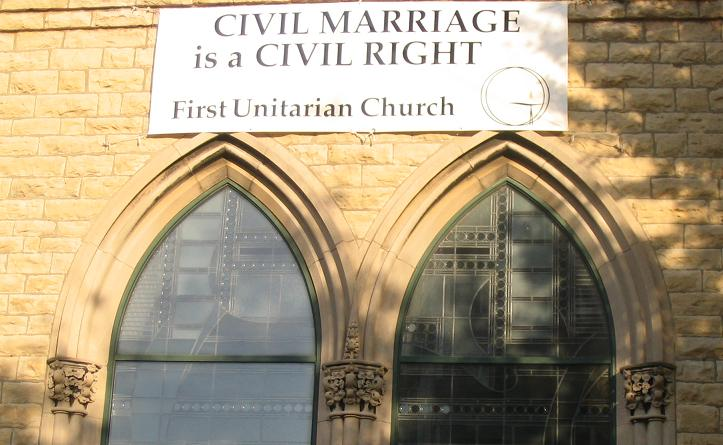
The U.S. guarantees freedom of religion and some churches in the U.S. take strong stances on political subjects.

Religion in the United States is remarkable in its high adherence level compared to other developed countries. The First Amendment to the country's Constitution prevents the government from having any authority in religion, and guarantees the free exercise of religion. Many faiths have flourished in the United States, including imports spanning the country's multicultural heritage as well as those founded within the country, and have led the United States to become the most religiously diverse country in the world.

== Demographics ==
The majority of Americans identify themselves as Christians (65% as of 2019), while non-Christian religions (including Islam, Judaism, Hinduism, and others) collectively make up about 6% of the adult population. Another 26% of the adult population identified as having no religious affiliation. A majority of Americans report that religion plays a "very important" role in their lives, a proportion unusual among developed nations, though similar to other nations in the Americas. According to the American Religious Identification Survey, religious belief varies considerably across the country: 59% of Americans living in Western states report a belief in God, yet in the South (the "Bible Belt") the figure is as high as 86%.

The United States has more Christians than any other country in the world (US is the largest Christian nation in respect to population). Going forward from its foundation, the United States has been called a Protestant nation by a variety of sources. This is despite the fact that Protestants are no longer the majority in the United States (43%).

== Religion and political identity ==
Politicians frequently discuss their religion when campaigning, and many churches and religious figures are highly politically active. As important as religion is in politics, Thomas Jefferson, the third president of the United States, had to fight his way into office due to his controversial thoughts about religion. His writing was often seen as anti-Christian. It is argued that Jefferson's win can be linked to him changing the election's narrative from one about his own religious beliefs, to one about his tolerance of religious freedom (Lambert).

White evangelicals in the US have tended toward affiliation with the Republican party.

Mainline Protestants, which once defined the center of American political, religious, and cultural life, have declined by two-thirds in the past fifty years.

Christian voters, especially white Christian voters, generally favored Donald Trump over Kamala Harris in the 2024 US Presidential election.

There are Christians in both the Democratic Party and the Republican Party, but evangelical Christians and conservative Catholics tend to support the Republican Party whereas more liberal Protestants, Catholics and secular voters tend to support the Democratic Party. A 2019 survey conducted by Pew Research Center found that 54% of adults believe the Republican Party to be "friendly" toward religion, while only 19% of respondents said the same of the Democratic Party.

Every President and Vice President, was raised in a family with affiliations with Christian religions. Only former Presidents John F. Kennedy and Joe Biden were raised in Roman Catholic families. Two former presidents, Richard Nixon and Herbert Hoover, were raised as Quakers. All the rest were raised in families affiliated with Protestant Christianity. However, many presidents have themselves had only a nominal affiliation with churches, and some never joined any church.

While fundamentalist religious people are less likely to have information collected about who they will vote for, they "tend to engage mainstream political activity at higher rates than the average American". While there is a common belief that religious voters will always vote Republican that is not necessarily the case. Whether the vote is made for one party or another is noticeably based on socioeconomic status. For low income religious people, there is almost no correlation between their religious beliefs and their voting decision. George W. Bush, a Methodist, earned a slim victory over John Kerry, with voters who cited "moral values" (a commonly used term among religiously-inclined voters) playing a crucial part in the election. Bush's clear victory has been directly attributed to fundamentalist Christian groups.

In 2006 Keith Ellison became the first Muslim elected to the federal government, as the representative of Minnesota's 5th congressional district. When re-enacting his swearing-in for photos, he used the copy of the Qur'an once owned by Thomas Jefferson.

In 2006, PRRI found that 54% of Democrats identified as Protestants. A Gallup Poll released in 2019 indicated that 60% of Americans would be willing to vote for an atheist as president. Research shows that candidates that are perceived to be religious are considered more trustworthy. A 2020 PRRI American Values Survey found that of Democratic voters, 42% were Protestant while 23% identified as Catholic. The same survey found that of Republican voters, 54% were Protestant while only 18% were Catholic. A November 2024 Politico Poll found that Evangelicals outnumbered Catholics among Harris and Trump voters. The 2023-2024 Pew Religious Landscape Study found that 51% of Democrats were Christian and mostly Protestant. A NORC survey of 2026 midterm voters for Democrat congressional candidates found that 36% were Protestant/other Christian and 19% were Catholic.

== Separation of church and state ==
In the 1780-1820s in New England the dominant Federalist Party was closely linked to the Congregational church; when the party collapsed, the church was disestablished. In 1800, and other elections, Federalists targeted infidelity in any form. They repeatedly charged that Republican candidates, especially Thomas Jefferson himself, were atheistic or nonreligious. Conversely, the Baptists, Methodists the other dissenters and the religiously nonaligned, favored the Republican cause. The Baptists, in particular, made the disestablishment one of their founding principles. Hence Jefferson chose the Baptists of Connecticut to pronounce there should be a "wall of separation" between church and state.

The separation of church and state is a legal and political principle which advocates derive from the First Amendment to the United States Constitution, which reads, "Congress shall make no law respecting an establishment of religion, or prohibiting the free exercise thereof". The phrase "separation of church and state", which does not appear in the Constitution itself, is generally traced to an 1802 letter by Thomas Jefferson to the Danbury Baptists, where Jefferson spoke of the combined effect of the Establishment Clause and the Free Exercise Clause of the First Amendment. It has since been quoted in several opinions handed down by the United States Supreme Court.

Robert N. Bellah has argued in his writings that although the separation of church and state is grounded firmly in the constitution of the United States, this does not mean that there is no religious dimension in the political society of the United States. He argued that in effect there is an American civil religion which is a nonsectarian faith with sacred symbols drawn from national history. Scholars have portrayed it as a cohesive force, a common set of values that foster social and cultural integration. Bellah's 1967 article analyzes the inaugural speech of John F. Kennedy: "Considering the separation of church and state, how is a president justified in using the word 'God' at all? The answer is that the separation of church and state has not denied the political realm a religious dimension."

== Catholics ==
Catholics represent the largest Christian denomination in America with over 68 million members. 85% of these Catholics found their faith to be "somewhat" to "very important" to them. In recent national elections Catholics cast 25 to 27 percent of the ballots.

Members of the Catholic Church have been active in the politics of the United States since the mid 19th century. The United States has never had an important religious party (unlike Europe and Latin America). There has never been a Catholic religious party, either local, state or national.

In 1776 Catholics comprised less than 1% of the population of the new nation, but their presence grew rapidly after 1840 with immigration from Germany, Ireland, Italy, Poland, and elsewhere in Catholic Europe from 1840 to 1914, and also from Latin America in the 20th century. Catholics now comprise 25% to 27% of the national vote, with over 68 million members today. 85% of today's Catholics report their faith to be "somewhat" to "very important" to them.

From the mid-19th century down to 1964 Catholics were solidly Democratic, sometimes at the 80%-90% level. Religious tensions were major issues in the presidential elections of 1928 when the Democrats nominated Al Smith, a Catholic who was defeated. Catholics formed a core part of the New Deal Coalition, with overlapping memberships in the Church, labor unions, and big city machines, and the working class, all of which promoted liberal policy positions in domestic affairs and anti-communism during the Cold War. Since the election of a Catholic President in 1960, Catholics have split about 50-50 between the two major parties in national elections.

Religious tensions arose once again in 1960 when the Democrats nominated John F. Kennedy, a Catholic who was elected. In 2004, with the nomination of John Kerry by the Democrats, who was at odds with the Church in the issues of abortion and same-sex marriage, his Catholic religion failed to attract significant votes, as slightly more Catholics voted for George W. Bush than for him.

With the decline of unions and big city machines, and with upward mobility into the middle classes, Catholics have drifted away from liberalism and toward conservatism on economic issues (such as taxes). Since the end of the Cold War, their strong anti-Communism has faded in importance. On social issues the Catholic Church takes strong positions against legal abortion and same-sex marriage and has formed coalitions with Protestant evangelicals to oppose and inspire political resistance to such policies in several Western countries.

Currently, 24 of the 100 U.S. Senators are Catholics (15 Democrats, 9 Republicans). 132 of the 435 members of the House of Representatives are Catholics. The former Speaker of the House, Democratic Nancy Pelosi of California, is Catholic.

=== The Know Nothings ===
The Know Nothings were a short-lived American political party in the mid-1850s. Know Nothingism was an anti-slavery party that recruited its strength from the collapse of the equally short-lived Free Soil Party and, in turn, provided the voters who formed the Republican Party and elected Abraham Lincoln to abolish slavery. The motivators of the Party's rise are considered to have been, 1.) nativist sentiment caused by the sudden, unprecedented influx of German and Irish immigrants in the late 1840s, 2.) a rapid, steep decline in factory wages caused by the sudden influx of very large numbers of Irish immigrants fleeing the Great Famine, 3.) the threat members perceived the expansion of a slave system would pose to free labor which, in the eyes of supporters of both the Free Soil and Know Nothing movements, threatened to reduce free men to "wage slaves,"' and 4.) fear that land in the western territories would be awarded to wealthy slave owners rather than to small farmers. It was due to this fear that slavery would destroy the economic prospects of white working families after the Party enrolled massive numbers of voters in the wake of the Kansas–Nebraska Act of 1854.

The party is remembered for anti-Catholicism, an attitude that resulted not only from the fact that America was an almost entirely Protestant country confronted for the first time by a wave of Catholic immigration.

== Religion: pietistic Republicans versus liturgical Democrats ==
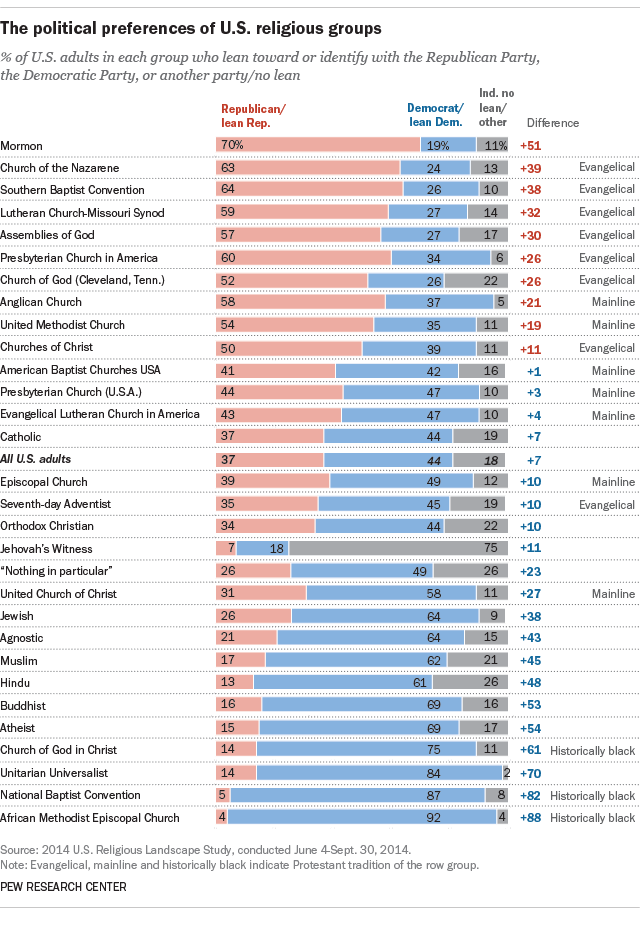
Pew Research from 2014 - Parties by Religion

Religious lines were sharply drawn. Methodists, Congregationalists, Presbyterians, Scandinavian Lutherans and other pietists in the North were tightly linked to the Republicans. In sharp contrast, liturgical groups, especially the Catholics, Episcopalians, and German Lutherans, looked to the Democratic Party for protection from pietistic moralism, especially prohibition. While both parties cut across economic class structures, the Democrats were supported more heavily by its lower tiers.

Cultural issues, especially prohibition and foreign language schools, became important because of the sharp religious divisions in the electorate. In the North, about 50% of the voters were pietistic Protestants who believed the government should be used to reduce social sins, such as drinking. Liturgical churches constituted over a quarter of the vote and wanted the government to stay out of personal morality issues. Prohibition debates and referendums heated up politics in most states over a period of decades, and national prohibition was finally passed in 1918 (repealed in 1932), serving as a major issue between the wet Democrats and the dry Republicans.

Voting Behavior by Religion, Northern USA Late 19th century
Religion	% Dem	% Rep
Immigrants
Irish Catholics	80	20
All Catholics	70	30
Confessional German Lutherans	65	35
German Reformed	60	40
French Canadian Catholics	50	50
Less Confessional German Lutherans	45	55
English Canadians	40	60
British Stock	35	65
German Sectarians	30	70
Norwegian Lutherans	20	80
Swedish Lutherans	15	85
Haugean Norwegians	5	95
Natives
Northern Stock
Quakers	5	95
Free Will Baptists	20	80
Congregational	25	75
Methodists	25	75
Regular Baptists	35	65
Blacks	40	60
Presbyterians	40	60
Episcopalians	45	55
Southern Stock
Disciples	50	50
Presbyterians	70	30
Baptists	75	25
Methodists	90	10

Source: Paul Kleppner, The Third Electoral System 1853-1892 (1979) p. 182

=== Labor union movement ===
The Catholic Church exercised a prominent role in shaping America's labor movement. From the onset of significant immigration in the 1840s, the Church in the United States was predominantly urban, with both its leaders and congregants usually of the laboring classes. Over the course of the second half of the nineteenth century, nativism, anti-Catholicism, and anti-unionism coalesced in Republican politics, and Catholics gravitated toward unions and the Democratic Party.

The Knights of Labor was the earliest labor organization in the United States, and in the 1880s, it is estimated that at least half its membership was Catholic (including Terence Powderly, its president from 1881 onward).

Yet the organization came under scrutiny from some of the church hierarchy because of its similarity to other "secret societies" (e.g., the Masons) that the Church forbade its followers to join. Others believed that unions could promote better lives for workers. The matter was resolved in 1887 when Cardinal James Gibbons of Baltimore interceded in Rome against a proposed condemnation of the Knights.

This was the context in which Pope Leo XIII wrote an encyclical letter that articulated the teaching of the Church with a view to the "new things" of the modern world. In Rerum novarum (1891), Leo criticized the concentration of wealth and power, spoke out against the abuses that workers faced and demanded that workers should be granted certain rights and safety regulations. He upheld the right of voluntary association, specifically commending labor unions. At the same time, he reiterated the Church's defense of private property, condemned socialism, and emphasized the need for Catholics to form and join unions that were not compromised by secular and revolutionary ideologies.

Rerum novarum provided new impetus for Catholics to become active in the labor movement, even if its exhortation to form specifically Catholic labor unions was widely interpreted as irrelevant to the pluralist context of the United States. While atheism underpinned many European unions and stimulated Catholic unionists to form separate labor federations, the religious neutrality of unions in the United States provided no such impetus. American Catholics seldom dominated unions, but they exerted influence across organized labor. Catholic union members and leaders played important roles in steering American unions away from socialism.

== Judaism ==
While earlier Jewish immigrants from Germany tended to be politically conservative, the wave of Eastern European Jews starting in the early 1880s, were generally more liberal or left wing and became the political majority. Many of the latter came to America with experience in the socialist, anarchist and communist movements as well as the Labor Bund, emanating from Eastern Europe. Many Jews rose to leadership positions in the early 20th century American labor movement and helped to found unions that played a major role in left wing politics and, after 1936, in Democratic Party politics. For most of the 20th century since 1936, the vast majority of Jews in the United States have been aligned with the Democratic Party. Towards the end of the 20th century and at the beginning of the 21st century, Republicans have launched initiatives to woo American Jews away from the Democratic Party.

Over the past century, Jews in Europe and the Americas have traditionally tended towards the political left, and played key roles in the birth of the labor movement as well as socialism. While Diaspora Jews have also been represented in the conservative side of the political spectrum, even politically conservative Jews have tended to support pluralism more consistently than many other elements of the political right.

There are also a number of Jewish secular organizations at the local, national, and international levels. These organizations often play an important part in the Jewish community. Most of the largest groups, such as Hadassah and the United Jewish Communities (UJC), have an elected leadership. No one secular group represents the entire Jewish community, and there is often significant internal debate among Jews about the stances these organizations take on affairs dealing with the Jewish community as a whole, such as antisemitism and Israeli policies. In the United States and Canada today, the mainly secular UJC, formerly known as the United Jewish Appeal (UJA), represents over 150 Jewish Federations and 400 independent communities across North America. Every major American city has its local "Jewish Federation", and many have sophisticated community centers and provide services, mainly health care-related. They raise record sums of money for philanthropic and humanitarian causes in North America and Israel. Other organizations such as the Anti-Defamation League, American Jewish Congress, American Jewish Committee, American Israel Public Affairs Committee, Zionist Organization of America, Americans for a Safe Israel, B'nai B'rith and Agudath Israel represent different segments of the American Jewish community on a variety of issues. J Street was set up in 2008 to advocate for American diplomatic leadership to achieve a two-state solution and a broader regional, comprehensive peace. Hillel caters for Jewish students in universities.

== Islam ==
Muslim political organizations lobby on behalf of various Muslim political interests.

- The Council on American-Islamic Relations (CAIR) is the United States largest Muslim civil rights and advocacy group, originally established to promote a positive image of Islam and Muslims in America. CAIR portrays itself as the voice of mainstream, moderate Islam on Capitol Hill and in political arenas throughout the United States. It has condemned acts of terrorism—while naming no one in particular—and has been working in collaboration with the White House on "issues of safety and foreign policy". The group has been criticized for alleged links to Islamic terrorism by conservative media and even put on the official list of terrorist organizations by the United Arab Emirates, but its leadership strenuously denies any involvement with such activities.
- The Muslim Public Affairs Council (MPAC) is an American Muslim public service and policy organization headquartered in Los Angeles and with offices in Washington, D.C. MPAC was founded in 1988. The mission of MPAC "encompasses promoting an American Muslim identity, fostering an effective grassroots organization, and training a future generation of men and women to share our vision. MPAC also works to promote an accurate portrayal of Islam and Muslims in mass media and popular culture, educating the American public (both Muslim and non-Muslim) about Islam, building alliances with diverse communities and cultivating relationships with opinion- and decision-makers."
- The American Islamic Congress is a small but growing moderate Muslim organization that promotes religious pluralism. Their official Statement of Principles states that "Muslims have been profoundly influenced by their encounter with America. American Muslims are a minority group, largely comprising immigrants and children of immigrants, who have prospered in America's climate of religious tolerance and civil rights. The lessons of our unprecedented experience of acceptance and success must be carefully considered by our community."
- The Free Muslims Coalition was created to eliminate broad base support for Islamic extremism and terrorism and to strengthen secular democratic institutions in the Middle East and the Muslim World by supporting Islamic reformation efforts.

== See also ==
- First Party System
- Second Party System
- Third Party System
- Fourth Party System
- Fifth Party System
- Sixth Party System
- American election campaigns in the 19th century
- Ethnocultural politics in the United States
- Gilded Age
- History of the United States Democratic Party
- History of the United States Republican Party
- History of religion in the United States
- Politics of the United States
