= Ethnic vote =

Ethnic vote may refer to:

- Latino vote
- Polish-American vote
- Ethnocultural politics in the United States
- Orthodox Jewish bloc voting

== See also ==
- Voting bloc
- Votebank
- Identity politics
