= Voting bloc =

Group of voters motivated by a common concern

A voting bloc is a group of voters that are strongly motivated by a specific common concern or group of concerns to the point that such specific concerns tend to dominate their voting patterns, causing them to vote together in elections. Frequently blocs come from the same community or have the same interests. Voters in a bloc tend to vote in the same or similar ways. These blocs tend to band together to campaign for a common interest or major issue. Blocs are used to allow a collection of voter to gain more leverage over elected officials by showing a significant portion of voters care about a major issue, allowing for a display of the ability of voters to maintain votes over specific issues from election to election.

== Religious groups ==
Beliefnet identifies 12 main religious blocs in American politics, such as the "Religious Right", whose concerns are dominated by religious and sociocultural issues; and American Jews, who are identified as a "strong Democratic group" with liberal views on economics and social issues. The result is that each of these groups votes en bloc in elections. Bloc voting in the United States is particularly cohesive among Orthodox Jews.

== Characteristics ==
Voting blocs can be defined by a host of other shared characteristics, including region, religion, age, gender, education level, race, and even musical taste. Further factors may be defined based on whether the voters reside in an urban or rural area, a phenomenon known as the Urban-rural political divide. Blocs are also defined based on what generation they are from. Such generational blocs are typically categorized by how the majority of a generation cares about a major issue.

== See also ==
- Iglesia ni Cristo and Philippine elections
- Political alliance
- Political party
- Votebank
- Latino vote
- Ethnocultural politics in the United States
- Orthodox Jewish bloc voting
