= Orthodox Jewish bloc voting =

Political strategy

Orthodox Jewish bloc voting is a political strategy used by Orthodox Jewish communities in the United States, predominantly in New York and New Jersey, to vote as a bloc as directed by local leadership. While Orthodox Jews as a group typically vote for Republican candidates on the national level, community leaders will often endorse local Democratic candidates if they are viewed as likely to win, or if they could effectively represent the Orthodox community's interests in a majority Democratic caucus.

== Notable instances ==
In the 2000 United States Senate election in New York, the Hasidic village of New Square gave Democrat Hillary Clinton 1,400 votes, compared to just 12 for her Republican opponent. Clinton's husband President Bill Clinton subsequently pardoned four New Square men convicted of defrauding government aid programs, which prompted allegations of vote trading. Clinton denied that clemency for the men had come up when she visited New Square on the campaign trail, and federal prosecutors determined in 2002 that no wrongdoing had occurred.

In the 2016 United States presidential election in New York, Hillary Clinton and Donald Trump's highest statewide totals both came from Orthodox areas: Clinton won 96% of the vote in a district of New Square, while Trump won 90% of the vote in a district of Monsey. In the 2020 election, Trump won 99% of the vote in the Satmar town of Kiryas Joel.

In the 2023 New Jersey General Assembly election, Democrat Avi Schnall, an Orthodox rabbi, flipped a strongly Republican state legislative seat thanks to near-unanimous support from Orthodox leaders. Schnall won the heavily Orthodox town of Lakewood with 86% of the two-way vote, despite Lakewood simultaneously giving Republican state senator Robert Singer (also endorsed by Orthodox leadership) 92% of the vote.

In the 2024 New York 17th district congressional race, Orthodox Jewish voters who supported incumbent Republican Mike Lawler registered en masse to vote in the Working Families Party primary, electing a placeholder candidate over Democrat Mondaire Jones, who was seeking the line. Jones' loss of the Working Families line was seen as helping Lawler's prospects for the general election.

In the 2024 New York state elections, Democratic presidential nominee Kamala Harris got zero votes in several precincts of the predominately Hasidic town of Ramapo, while Democratic U.S. Senator Kirsten Gillibrand received hundreds of votes in those same precincts and even won some of them. A lawsuit was filed by the SMART Legislation advocacy group and three individuals alleging irregularities, though a Rockland County Board of Elections review did not find any issues. The discrepancy has been attributed by some sources to Hasidic bloc voting skewing vote totals.

== Effects ==
Bloc voting has been noted to increase the political influence of Orthodox Jewish communities. In 2022, the New York Times wrote that city and state officials in New York had "avoided taking action" over Hasidic yeshivas that violated state laws, "bowing to the influence of Hasidic leaders who push their followers to vote as a bloc and have made safeguarding the schools their top political priority". Due to bloc voting, local and statewide candidates in New York treat Hasidic community endorsements as critical, and few elected officials embrace positions that would antagonize them.

Some Orthodox politicians in New York have regularly run unopposed due to strong community support, including on both the Democratic and Republican lines. In 2022, Republican New York gubernatorial nominee Lee Zeldin won the state’s heavily Orthodox 48th Assembly district by 66 points, but the district concurrently elected Democratic assemblyman Simcha Eichenstein, whom Republicans had not even run a candidate against.

== Decline ==
The prevalence of Orthodox Jewish bloc voting has been noted by some commentators to be declining in recent years, as Orthodox Jews increasingly vote based on personal conviction or participate in national ideological movements.

== See also ==
- Split-ticket voting
- Ethnocultural politics in the United States
