= American election campaigns in the 19th century =

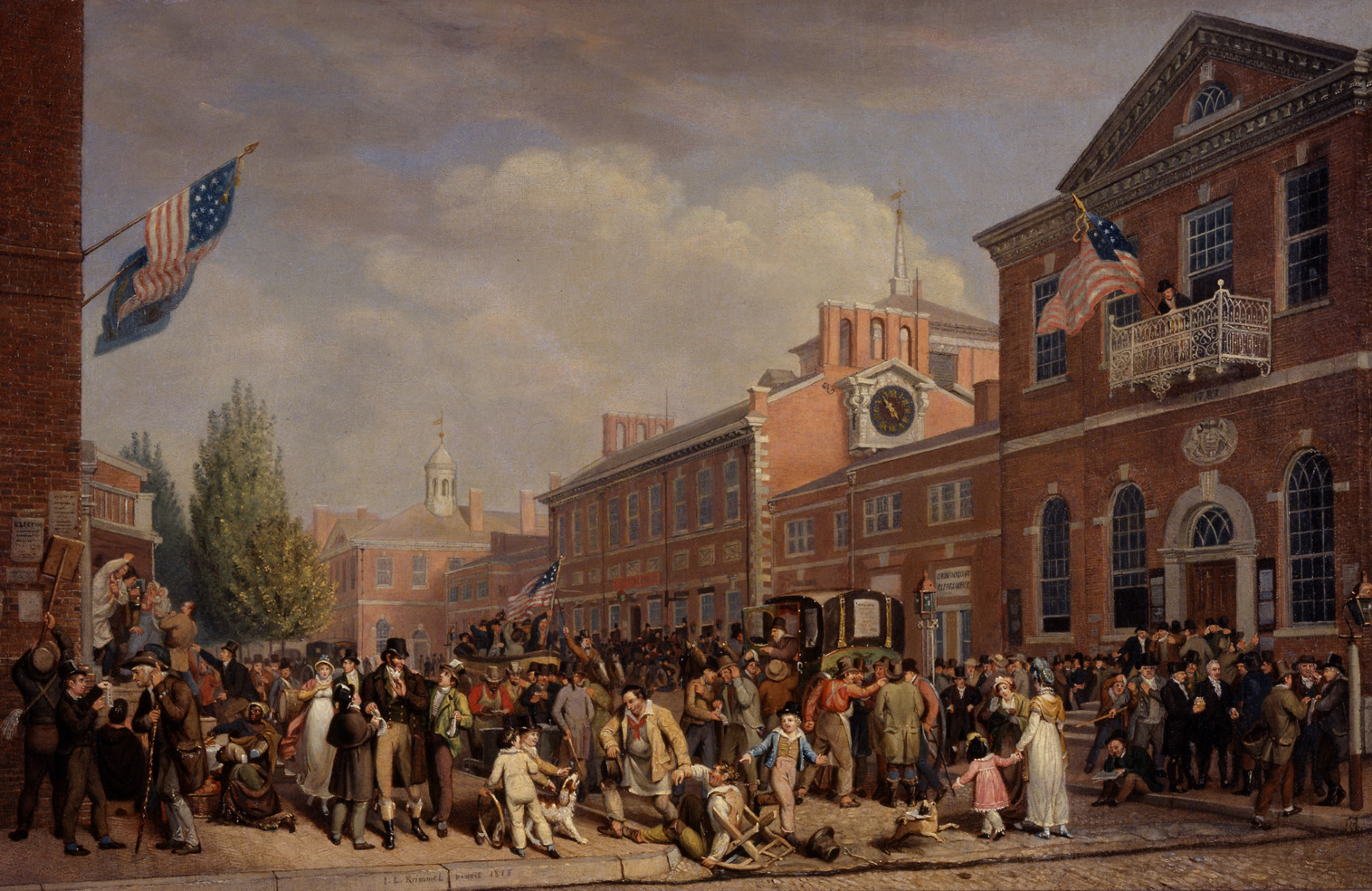
Election Day in Philadelphia (1815) by John Lewis Krimmel, picturing the site of Independence Hall and demonstrating the importance of elections as public occasions

In the 19th century, a number of new methods for conducting American election campaigns developed in the United States. For the most part the techniques were original, not copied from Europe or anywhere else. The campaigns were also changed by a general enlargement of the voting franchise—the states began removing or reducing property and tax qualifications for suffrage and by the early 19th century the great majority of free adult white males could vote (Rhode Island refused until a serious rebellion took place in 1844). During the Reconstruction Era, Republicans in Congress used the military to create a biracial electorate, but when the troops were removed in 1877, blacks steadily lost political power in the increasingly one-party Southern United States. After 1890 blacks generally lost the vote in the South.

The system was characterized by two major parties who dominated government at the local, state and national level, and enlisted most voters into a loyal "army" of supporters. There were numerous small third parties that usually were short-lived or inconsequential. The complex system of electing federal, state and local officials meant that election campaigns were both frequent and consequential in terms of political power. Nearly all government jobs were distributed on a patronage basis to party workers. The jobs were honorific and usually paid very well. The best way to get a patronage job was to work in the election campaign for the winning party, and volunteers were numerous. Elections provided Americans with much of their news. The elections of 1828–32, 1854–56, and 1894–96 are usually considered realigning elections.

== Army style ==
Political parties in the 19th century thought of themselves as armies—as disciplined, hierarchical fighting organizations whose mission it was to defeat a clearly identified opponent. If defeated themselves, they knew how to retreat, regroup, and fight again another day. If they won, then the victory was sweet. In an era when many if not most political leaders had experience as militia officers, and perhaps had engaged in actual combat, structuring parties along a militaristic chain of command seemed logical enough. To fight a political battle, the party had to develop a chain-of-command. The heads of the state and national tickets were normally the acknowledged leaders. After the election leadership reverted to the state and county committees, or sometimes to state "bosses," with little power held by the national chairman. County committees sent delegates to the state convention, where state nominees were selected. In turn, the county committees were based on local conventions — mass meetings that were open to any self-identified partisan. In the 1790s Thomas Jefferson and Alexander Hamilton created their supporting parties by working outward from the national capital, as did the Whigs in the 1830s. On the other hand, major third parties typically emerged from the state level, including the Anti-Masons, Republicans, Know-Nothings and Populists. The Anti-Masonic movement gave rise to or expanded the use of many innovations which became accepted practice among other parties, including nominating conventions and party newspapers. In contrast to the Democrats, who always stressed unwavering party loyalty to the chosen candidates, the Anti-Masonic heritage to the Whigs included a distrust of behind-the-scenes political maneuvering by party bosses. Instead they made direct appeals to the people through gigantic rallies, parades, and rhetorical rabble-rousing. In addition, the Anti-Masons aided in the rise of the Whig Party as the major alternative to the Democrats, with conventions, newspapers and Anti-Masonic positions on issues including internal improvements and tariffs being adopted by the Whigs.

Theodore Roosevelt, before he became president in 1901, was deeply involved in New York City politics. He explains how the machine worked:

The organization of a party in our city is really much like that of an army. There is one great central boss, assisted by some trusted and able lieutenants; these communicate with the different district bosses, whom they alternately bully and assist. The district boss in turn has a number of half-subordinates, half-allies, under him; these latter choose the captains of the election districts, etc., and come into contact with the common heelers.

Cheatham explores in detail many of the fine points including mass rallies, auxiliary organizations, women's groups, music, pamphlets, and material objects such as banners, marching uniforms and buttons.

== Recruiting partisans ==
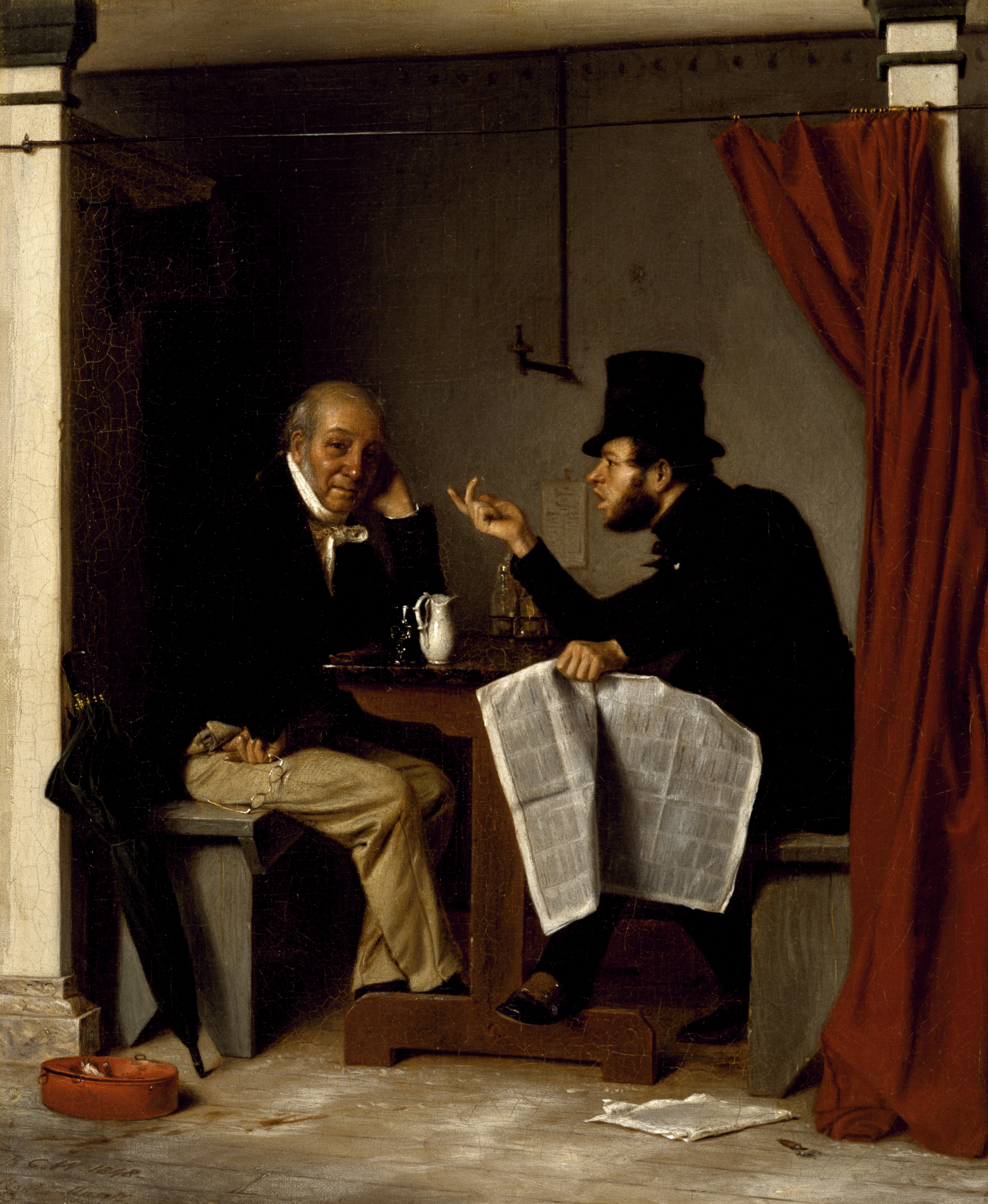
Politics in an Oyster House (1848) by Richard Caton Woodville

By 1800 the Jeffersonian Republicans had a well-developed system for recruiting troops throughout the country, and a correspondence system state and local party leaders used to keep in touch. As a Boston Federalist complained, "The jacobins have at last made their own discipline perfect; they are trained, officered, regimented and formed to subordination in a manner that our own militia have never yet equaled." The Federalists began to imitate their opponents' tactics, but were always too elitist to appreciate the value of a grass roots movement. The Democratic-Republican caucus in Congress chose presidential candidates for the party, while the Federalists invented (in 1812) a much more flexible system of a national convention. Unlike the caucus, the convention represented voters in every district, and the delegates were chosen specifically for the task of selecting candidates. By the 1830s, the standard had been established that participation in the convention identified the person with the party and required him to support the nominees selected at the convention. It was possible to bolt a convention before candidates were selected, as the southern Democrats did in 1860, and Roosevelt's supporters did in 1912. New York Democrats were perennially split into Hard and Soft factions, and the Whigs sometimes split as well. Typically, both factions claimed their ticket was the one true legitimate party ticket.

William Jennings Bryan perfected the technique of multiple appeals in 1896, running simultaneously as a regular Democrat, a Silver Republican, and a regular Populist. Voters of all parties could vote for him without a crossing their personal party loyalty. Most states soon thereafter banned the same person running on different tickets—one man, one party, one platform became the usual rule (except in New York, where third, fourth and fifth parties have flourished since the 1830s).

== Mobilizing voters ==
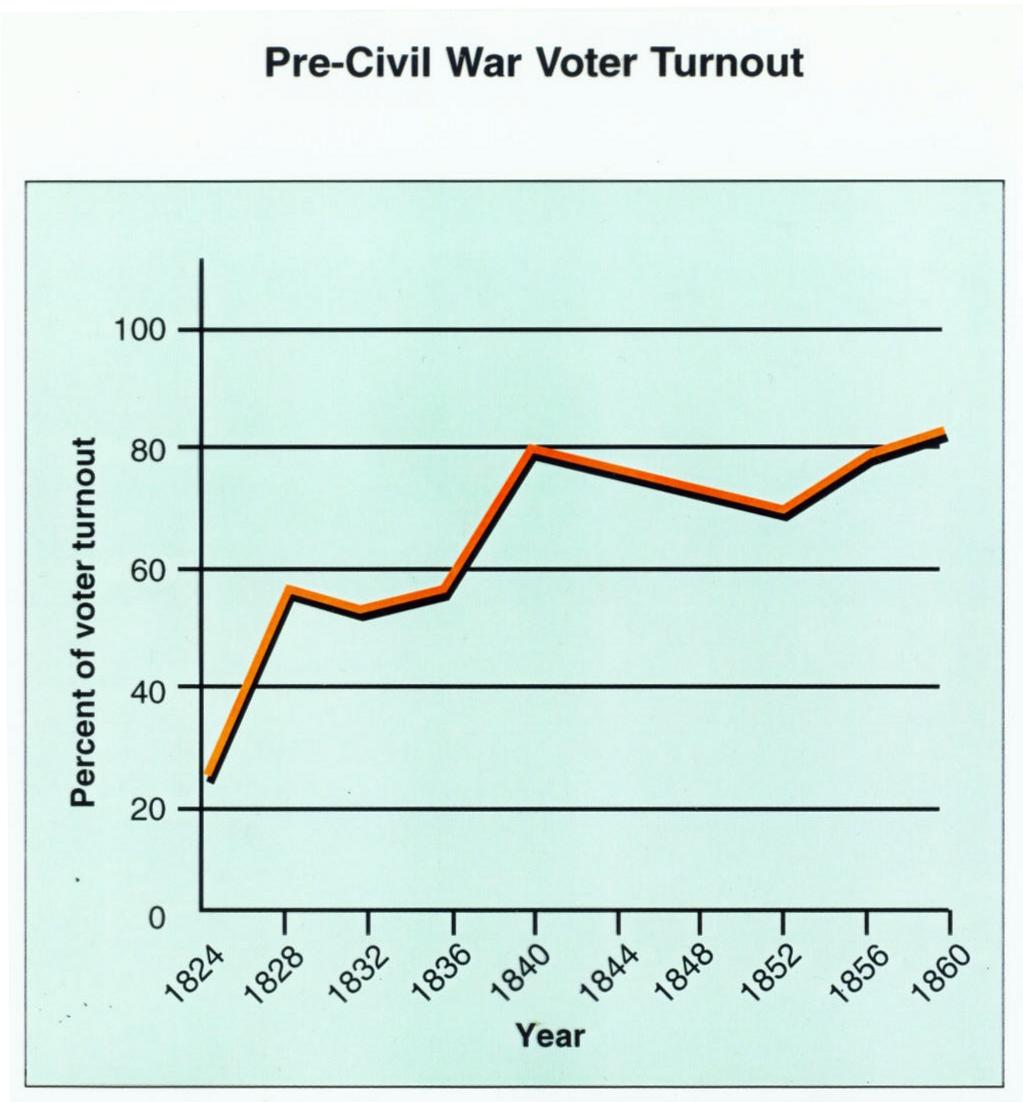
Turnout soared after 1824

The basic campaign strategy was the maximum mobilization of potential votes. To find new supporters politicians systematically canvassed their communities, talking up the state and national issues of the day, and watching which themes drew the best responses. In such a large, complex, pluralistic nation, the politicians discovered that citizens were especially loyal to their own ethno-religious groups. These groups had distinctive moral perspectives and political needs. The Whigs and Republicans were especially effective in winning support among pietistic and evangelical denominations. During Reconstruction (1866–1876), the Republicans dominated the South with their strong base among African-Americans, augmented by Scalawags. The Democrats did much better among Catholics and other high-church (liturgical) groups, as well as among those who wanted minimal government, and among whites who demanded that African Americans not be granted political or social equality.

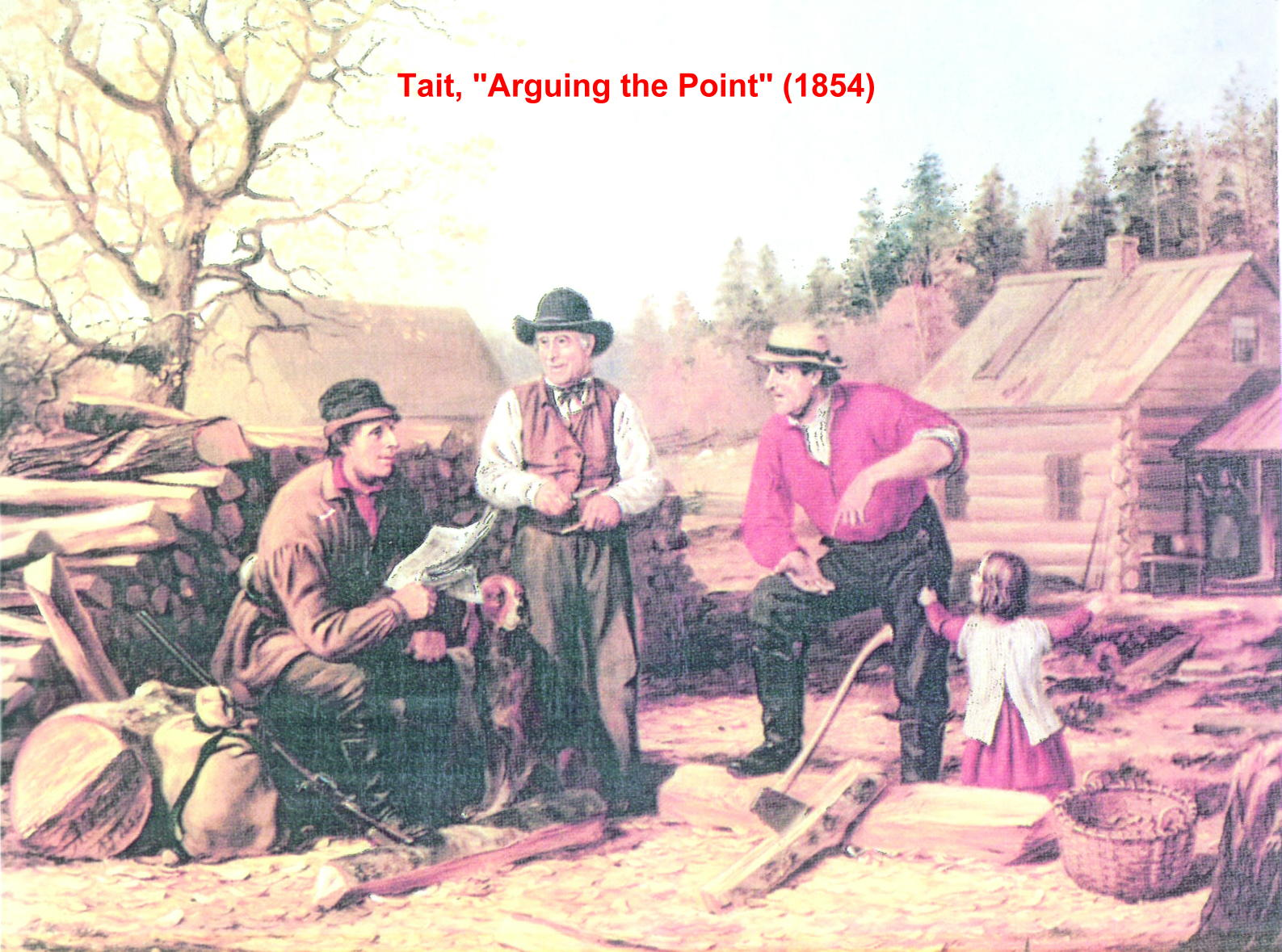
Americans arguing politics in 1854 while neglecting the farm chores; painting by Arthur Fitzwilliam Tait (1819–1905)

As the parties developed distinctive positions on issues such as the modernization of the economy and westward expansion, voters found themselves attracted to one party or the other. The Whigs and Republicans aggressively supported modernizing the economy, supporting banks, railroads, factories, and tariffs, and promised a rich home market in the cities for farm products. The Whigs always opposed expansion, as did the Republicans until 1898. The Democrats talked of agrarian virtues of the yeoman farmer, westward expansion, and how well rural life comported with Jeffersonian values.

Both parties set up campaign clubs, such as the Wide Awakes where young men paraded in torchlight processions wearing special uniforms and holding colorful banners. By the late century the parties in the Midwest combined to turn out over 90 percent of the eligible electorate in entire states, reaching over 95 percent in 1896 in Illinois, Indiana, Iowa, Michigan, and Ohio. Some counties passed the 100-percent mark, not because of fraud, but because the parties tracked people down whom the census had missed. Fraud did take place in municipal elections in large cities, where the ward-heelers could expect tangible rewards. Apart from some Reconstruction episodes in the South, there was little fraud in presidential elections because the local workers were not in line for presidential rewards.

The best way to build enthusiasm was to show enthusiasm. The parties used rallies, parades, banners, buttons and insignia to display partisanship and promote the theme that with so much strength, victory must be inevitable. The side that lost was usually surprised, and tended to ascribe defeat to preternatural factors, such as bad weather or treachery.

== Internal communications ==
The parties created an internal communications system designed to keep in close touch with the voters. They set up networks of activists in every county charged with visiting every potential supporter in a specified neighborhood, especially in the critical last days before the election. These workers, of course, comprised the activists who attended conventions and ultimately selected the candidates. This intensive face-to-face networking provided excellent information in both directions—the leaders immediately found out what the rank-and-file liked and disliked.

The first communications system was a national network of partisan newspapers. Nearly all weekly and daily papers were party organs until the early 20th century. Thanks to the invention of high-speed presses for city papers, and free postage for rural sheets, newspapers proliferated. In 1850, the Census counted 1,630 party newspapers (with a circulation of about one per voter), and only 83 "independent" papers. The party line was behind every line of news copy, not to mention the authoritative editorials, which exposed the "stupidity" of the enemy and the "triumphs" of the party in every issue. Editors were senior party leaders, and often were rewarded with lucrative postmasterships. Top publishers, such as Horace Greeley, Whitelaw Reid, Schuyler Colfax, Warren Harding and James Cox, were nominated on the national ticket.

Kaplan outlines the systematic methods by which newspapers expressed their partisanship. Paid advertising was unnecessary, as the party encouraged all its loyal supporters to subscribe:

- Editorials explained in detail the strengths of the party platform, and the weaknesses and fallacies of the opposition.
- As election neared, there were lists of approved candidates.
- Party meetings, parades and rallies were publicized ahead of time, and reported in depth afterward. Excitement and enthusiasm was exaggerated, while the dispirited enemy rallies were ridiculed.
- Speeches were often transcribed in full detail, even long ones that ran thousands of words.
- Woodcut illustrations celebrated the party symbols and portray the candidates.
- Editorial cartoons ridiculed the opposition and promoted the party ticket.
- As the election neared, predictions and informal polls guaranteed victory.
- The newspapers printed filled-out ballots which party workers distributed on election day so voters could drop them directly into the boxes. Everyone could see who the person voted for.
- The first news reports the next day, often claimed victory – sometimes it was days or weeks before the editor admitted defeat.

After 1900, William Randolph Hearst, Joseph Pulitzer and other big city politician-publishers discovered they could make far more profit through advertising, at so many dollars per thousand readers. By becoming non-partisan they expanded their base to include the opposition party and the fast-growing number of consumers who read the ads but were less and less interested in politics. There was less political news after 1900, apparently because citizens became more apathetic, and shared their partisan loyalties with the new professional sports teams that attracted growing audiences.

Whitelaw Reid, the powerful long-time editor of the Republican New York Tribune, emphasized the importance of partisan newspapers in 1879:

The true statesman and the really influential editor are those who are able to control and guide parties....There is an old question as to whether a newspaper controls public opinion or public opinion controls the newspaper. This at least is true: that editor best succeeds who best interprets the prevailing and the better tendencies of public opinion, and, who, whatever his personal views concerning it, does not get himself too far out of relations to it. He will understand that a party is not an end, but a means; will use it if it lead to his end, -- will use some other if that serve better, but will never commit the folly of attempting to reach the end without the means....Of all the puerile follies that have masqueraded before High Heaven in the guise of Reform, the most childish has been the idea that the editor could vindicate his independence only by sitting on the fence and throwing stones with impartial vigor alike at friend and foe.

== Financing parties ==
Campaigns were financed internally for most of the century. Aspirants for office volunteered their services as speakers; wealthy leaders contributed cash, and patronage appointees not only worked for the party but also donated 2 to 5 percent of the salaries. The problem with the system was the winner's curse: in a close election, campaign managers promise the same lucrative jobs over and over again. If they lost it made no difference; if they won they faced an impossible task, which was guaranteed to alienate supporters. Abraham Lincoln, for example, was a leading western supporter of Zachary Taylor in 1848, and wanted in return to be named Commissioner of the United States General Land Office. Instead, he was offered a job in Oregon which, while paying well, would terminate his career in Illinois. Lincoln declined, and left the party. After civil service reform ratcheted into place late in the century, new revenue sources were needed. Mark Hanna found the solution in 1896, as he systematically billed corporations for their share of the campaign.

== The crusade ==
The most exciting—even passionate—campaign was the crusade. A new body of intensely moralistic politicians would suddenly discover that the opposition was ensconced in power, was thoroughly corrupt, and had plans to utterly destroy republicanism. Americans were profoundly committed to the principle that republicanism could never be allowed to disappear, so crusades roused their emotional intensity. The American Revolution itself had followed this formula, as did Jefferson's followers in 1800. Andrew Jackson in 1828 started the Second Party System by crusading against the "corrupt bargain" that had denied him the White House in 1824, and again against the Bank of the United States in 1832. James Gordon Bennett Sr. (1795–1872) was the powerful editor and publisher of the New York Herald, 1835–1866. It typically had the largest readership base in New York City and was a pioneer in using new techniques to reach the largest possible audience. According to historian Robert C Bannister, Bennett was:

A gifted and controversial editor. Bennett transformed the American newspaper. Expanding traditional coverage, the Harold provided sports reports, a society page, and advice to the lovelorn, soon permanent features of most metropolitan dailies. Bennett covered murders and sex scandals and delicious detail, faking materials when necessary.... His adroit use of telegraph, pony express, and even offshore ships to intercept European dispatches set high standards for rapid news gathering.

Bannister also argues that Bennett was a leading crusader against evils he perceived:

Combining opportunism and reform, Bennett exposed fraud on Wall Street, attacked the Bank of the United States, and generally joined the Jacksonian assault on privilege. Reflecting a growing nativism, he published excerpts from the anti-catholic disclosures of "Maria Monk," and he greeted Know-Nothingism cordially. Defending labor unions in principle, he assailed much union activity. Unable to condemn slavery outright, he opposed abolitionism.

Republicans began the Third Party System by crusading against slavery in 1856 while Greeley rang the charges against Grant's corruption in 1872. The most dramatic crusade was that of William Jennings Bryan in 1896, as he identified the gold and monied interests as responsible for depression, poverty and plutocracy. The way to deal with crusaders was not to defend the status quo but to launch a counter-crusade, attacking the crusaders as crazy extremists. Thus Jefferson was attacked as an atheist, Jackson as a murderer and duelist, Fremont as a disunionist, and Bryan as an anarchist.

== Democracy in practice ==
In the 1820s every government office was elected, or chosen by elected officials. After 1848 many states revised their constitutions so that judges were elected to fixed terms, and had to campaign before the voters like everyone else. Unlike other countries, many different offices were elected, with election days staggered so there was little respite from constant campaigning. As the politicians discovered more potential blocs of voters, they worked to abolish the traditional property standards for suffrage. The principles of republicanism seemed to require that everyone be eligible, and indeed actually vote. Several states allowed immigrants to vote before they took out citizenship papers; elsewhere the parties facilitated the naturalization process. By mid-century, practically every adult white male was a potential voter—or indeed, an actual voter, as turnout nationwide reached 81 percent in 1860. America stood in stark contrast with Europe, where the middle classes, peasants and industrial workers had to mobilize to demand suffrage. Late in the century, Americans did create farmer and labor movements, but most were nonpartisan, and those that fielded candidates rarely lasted more than an election or two.

== Democracy and art ==
George Caleb Bingham (1811–1879) was an American artist whose paintings of elections in the 1850s are used by historians to explain the complexities and details of grassroots democracy. The paintings were on tour for years, as Americans paid money to see themselves in political action.

Bingham's Election Series comprises three paintings: The County Election, Stump Speaking, and The Verdict of the People. Bingham intended for the series to reach a national audience rather than Missourians alone. To spread his idea of free people and free institutions, he exhibited his paintings in Washington and urged the Library Committee of Congress to purchase them so American leaders could view them. When the Library Committee of Congress decided not to purchase his trio, he lent the paintings to the Mercantile Library Association in St. Louis.

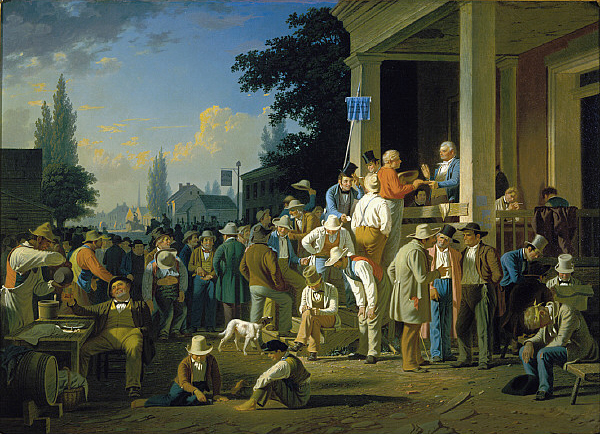
George Caleb Bingham's The County Election, 1852

=== The County Election ===
The first painting made for the Election Series shows the voting process in Missouri. The County Election depicts a variety of people from several different social classes, such as young boys playing a game, two men talking about the election happening around them, and a mass of men walking up the stairs to vote. A banner shows the words, "The Will of the People The Supreme Law", a credo that had great meaning for Bingham. He believed that people had a right to share their ideas; he also believed that he lost his seat in the legislature in 1846 due to his failure to follow the people's will.

A mill in the painting's background provides both a local detail and a reference to a Whig candidate who used a mill as a political symbol. The cedar barrels are evocative of another Whig candidate, who used these as his political symbol. In his first painting of The County Election, Bingham showed two men flipping a coin beneath a judge. The two people represent ex-governor Marmaduke's bet that he had placed on the election of Bingham versus his opponent, Erasmus Sappington. Bingham also purposefully kept the scene outside to represent universal suffrage, one of his beliefs. The openness of the setting shows that politics should happen in the open rather than behind the curtains of the government. The idea of universal suffrage aligns with Bingham's idea of the will of the people: everyone should have the right to vote because the will of the people should be the supreme law. One critic complained that the painting made a mockery of American principles by including details such as the drunkard voting in the foreground. The critic claimed that by showing drinking and gambling as part of the election process, Bingham was defaming the political process.

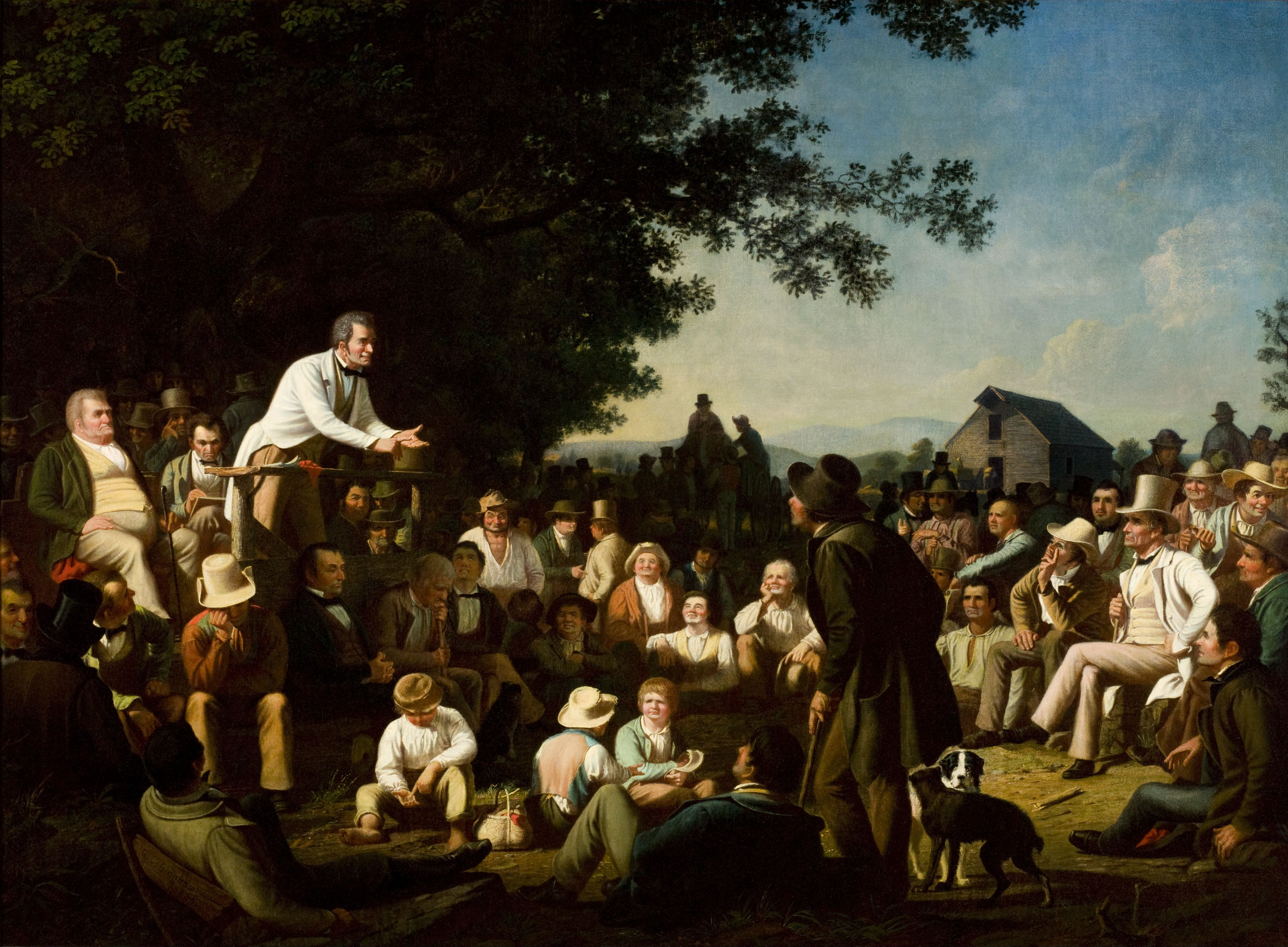
George Caleb Bingham's Stump Speaking, 1853–54

=== Stump Speaking ===
In the second painting of the trio, Stump Speaking, a politician persuades Missourians to vote in his favor. Depicted are three figures who stand out because of their startling bright white clothing: the "Stump Speaker", the "Outstanding Citizen" (the seated man opposite of the speaker), and the "Small Businessman" (the young child in the middle of the painting). Before creating the painting, Bingham had made preliminary sketches of the three aforementioned people, who represented his ideas of the past, present, and future of American politics. The "Outstanding Citizen", as Bingham's sketch refers to him, represents the past, as the man's sharp edges and fine clothes show how he is unwilling to bend his beliefs, and instead works among the people. His sharp edges contrast with the softer curves of the "Stump Speaker", the character who represents the present of American politics. The "Stump Speaker" appears to be swaying the assembled crowd by bending to the people's desires, shown by the curving arm that is outstretched to the audience. The "Small Businessman" represents the future. That child shows how people are starting to focus more on their money, as the child does, and less on politics, parallel to how the child is detached from the debate surrounding him. The three people represent "the Jeffersonian past, of statesmen and gentlemen farmers; the Jacksonian present, of demagogues, party hacks, and gullible citizens; and a materialistic future of isolated citizens with no common public life at all."

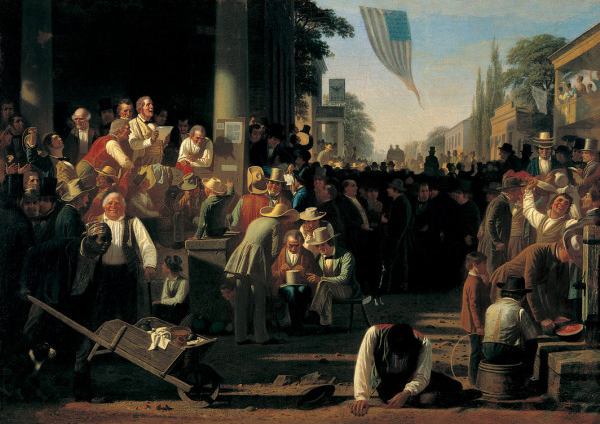
George Caleb Bingham's The Verdict of the People 1854–55

=== The Verdict of the People ===
The last painting of Bingham's Election Series, The Verdict of the People, tells the end of the story represented in the series. In this painting, Bingham included several political motives and ideas regarding slavery, temperance, and a representative government. During the early 1850s, the temperance movement grew and more states were abolishing alcohol. A book by Herman Humphrey, Parallel between Intemperance and Slavery, associated the cause of anti-slavery to that of temperance. Bingham showed his view on intemperance and slavery by painting a banner that said, "Freedom for Virtue Restriction for Vice." The banner referred to temperance by saying that the vice and alcohol would need to be restricted for the people to be free. The banner then references Bingham's ideas of slavery by using the connection of the temperance movement and the anti-slavery movement to show that Bingham thought negatively about slavery and shared that view with intemperance.

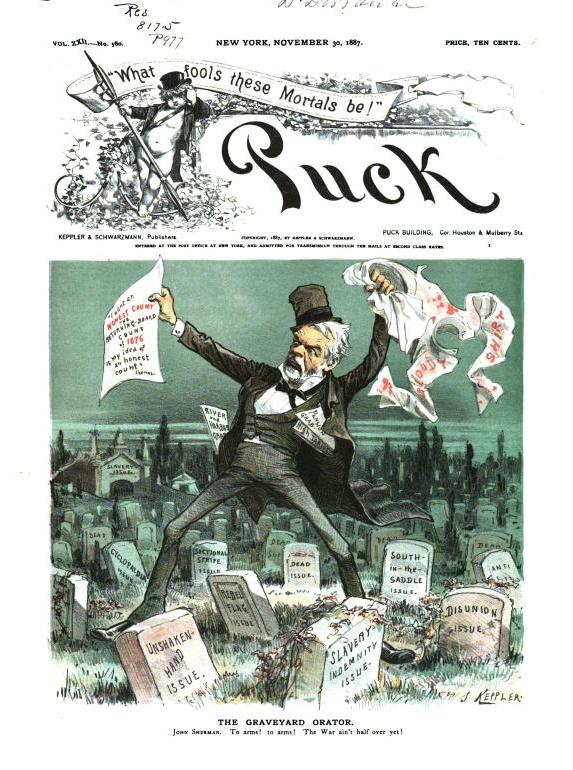
Puck cartoon ridiculing Republican Senator John Sherman for his use of "bloody shirt" memories of the Civil War

== Puck Magazine ==
Puck Magazine was a political humor magazine that generally favored Democrats and poked fun at Republicans. "Waving the bloody shirt" was a phrase used to ridicule opposing politicians who made emotional calls to avenge the blood of political martyrs. The phrase gained popularity with a fictitious incident in which Benjamin Franklin Butler of Massachusetts, when making a speech on the floor of the U.S. House of Representatives, allegedly held up a shirt stained with the blood of a carpetbagger whipped by the Ku Klux Klan during the Reconstruction Era. While Butler did give a speech condemning the Klan, he never waved a bloody shirt.

== See also ==
- Ethnocultural politics in the United States
- First Party System, 1790s–1820s
- Second Party System, 1820s–1850s
- Third Party System, 1850s–1890s
- Fourth Party System, 1890s–1930s
- Mass media and American politics
- List of United States political catchphrases, slogans and rhetoric
