= History of ethnocultural politics in the United States =

Voting patterns of certain US cultural or religious groups

In the United States, ethnocultural politics or ethnoreligious politics refers to the pattern of certain cultural groups or religious denominations to vote heavily for one party. Groups can be based on ethnicity (such as Hispanics, Irish, Germans, etc.), race (White people, Black people, Asian Americans, etc.) or religion (Protestant and later Evangelical or Catholic, etc.) or on overlapping categories (e.g. Irish Catholics). In the Southern United States, race was the determining factor. Each of the two major parties was a coalition of ethnoreligious groups in the Second Party System (1830s–1850s) and also in the Third Party System (1850s–1890s).

== Second Great Awakening: 1800–1850 ==
The Protestant religious revivals of the early 19th century had a profound impact on shaping the moral values of the affected voters, pushing them into moralistic political programs, such as opposition to slavery and calling for prohibition of alcoholic beverages. Revivals and perfectionist hopes of improving individuals and society continued to increase from 1840 to 1865 across all major denominations, especially in urban areas. Evangelists often directly addressed issues such as slavery, greed, and poverty, laying the groundwork for later reform movements. Although the women could not vote or hold office, they could influence the political viewpoints of their menfolk. In the midst of shifts in theology and church polity, American Christians began progressive movements to reform society during this period. Known commonly as antebellum reform, the phenomenon included reforms in temperance, women's rights, abolitionism, and a multitude of other questions faced by society.

The religious enthusiasm of the Second Great Awakening was echoed by the new political enthusiasm of the Second Party System. More active participation in politics by more segments of the population brought religious and moral issues into the political sphere. The spirit of evangelical humanitarian reforms was carried on in the antebellum Whig party. Historians stress the understanding common among participants of reform as being a part of God's plan. As a result, local churches saw their roles in society in purifying the world through the individuals to whom they could bring salvation and through changes in the law and the creation of institutions. Interest in transforming the world was applied to mainstream political action, as temperance activists, antislavery advocates, and proponents of other variations of reform sought to implement their beliefs into national politics. While Protestant religion had previously played an important role on the American political scene, the Second Great Awakening strengthened the role that it would play.

== Midwest ==
Politics in the Midwest was deeply rooted in ethnocultural divisions from the 1830s to the 20th century. Yankee settlers from New England started arriving in Ohio before 1800 and spread throughout the northern half of the Midwest. Most of them started as farmers, but the larger proportion later moved to towns and cities as entrepreneurs, businessmen, and urban professionals. Since its beginnings in the 1830s, Chicago business was under Yankee control from the 1830s, and the railroad and financial metropolis quickly came to dominate the Midwestern economy. However, city politics was under the control of complex ethnic coalitions in both parties. Finally, in the 1930s, the Irish took control of the Democratic Party and the city government.

The historian John Buenker has examined the worldview of the Yankee settlers in the Midwest:

Because they arrived first and had a strong sense of community and mission, Yankees were able to transplant New England institutions, values, and mores, altered only by the conditions of frontier life. They established a public culture that emphasized the work ethic, the sanctity of private property, individual responsibility, faith in residential and social mobility, practicality, piety, public order and decorum, reverence for public education, activists, honest, and frugal government, town meeting democracy, and he believed that there was a public interest that transcends particular and stick ambitions. Regarding themselves as the elect and just in a world rife with sin, air, and corruption, they felt a strong moral obligation to define and enforce standards of community and personal behavior.... This pietistic worldview was substantially shared by British, Scandinavian, Swiss, English-Canadian and Dutch Reformed immigrants, as well as by German Protestants and many of the Forty-Eighters.

Midwestern politics pitted Yankees against the German Catholics and Lutherans, who were often led by the Irish Catholics. Such large groups, Buenker argues:

Generally subscribed to the work ethic, a strong sense of community, and activist government but were less committed to economic individualism and privatism and ferociously opposed to government supervision of the personal habits. Southern and eastern European immigrants generally leaned more toward the Germanic view of things, while modernization, industrialization, and urbanization modified nearly everyone's sense of individual economic responsibility and put a premium on organization, political involvement, and education.

== Third Party System: 1850s–1890s ==
Religious lines were sharply drawn. Methodists, Congregationalists, Presbyterians, Scandinavian Lutherans and other pietists in the North were tightly linked to the Republican Party. In sharp contrast, liturgical groups, especially the Catholics, Episcopalians, and German Lutherans, looked to the Democratic Party for protection from pietistic moralism, especially Prohibition. While both parties cut across economic class structures, the Democrats were supported more heavily by its lower tiers.

Cultural issues, especially Prohibition and foreign language schools, became important because of the sharp religious divisions in the electorate. In the North, about 50% of the voters were pietistic Protestants who believed the government should be used to reduce social sins, such as drinking. Liturgical churches comprised over a quarter of the vote and wanted the government to stay out of personal morality issues. Prohibition debates and referendums heated up politics in most states over a period of decades, as national Prohibition was finally passed in 1919 and repealed in 1933. It served as a major issue between the wet Democrats and the dry Republicans.

=== Germans ===
German Americans comprised the largest ethnic group in the North, but they were sharply divided along religious lines. Catholics, several groups of Lutherans, Methodists, and other Protestants each formed tight-knit communities. The Catholics and Lutherans operated separate parochial schools. In addition there were secular groups, ranging from the Forty-Eighters (liberal refugees from the failed 1848 revolution) to socialists. Relatively few German Americans held office, but the men voted once they became citizens. In general, during the Third Party System (1850s–1890s), the Protestants and Jews leaned toward the Republican Party, and the Catholics were strongly Democratic. When Prohibition was on the ballot, the Germans voted solidly against it since they strongly distrusted moralistic crusaders, whom they called "Puritans," including the temperance reformers and many Populists. The German community strongly opposed Free Silver and voted heavily against the crusader William Jennings Bryan in 1896. In 1900, however, many German Democrats returned to their party and voted for Bryan, perhaps because of President William McKinley's foreign policy. Many Germans in late-19th-century America were socialists, and they were usually affiliated with labor unions. Germans played a significant role in the American labor movement, especially in the brewing and the construction trades.

=== Realignment in 1850s ===
The Republican Party emerged from the great political realignment of the mid-1850s. William Gienapp argues that the great realignment of the 1850s began before the Whig party collapse, and was caused not by politicians but by voters at the local level. The central forces were ethno-cultural, involving tensions between pietistic Protestants versus liturgical Catholics, Lutherans and Episcopalians regarding Catholicism, prohibition, and nativism. Anti-slavery did play a role but it was less important at first. The Know-Nothing party embodied the social forces at work, but its weak leadership was unable to solidify its organization, and the Republicans picked it apart. Nativism was so powerful that the Republicans could not avoid it, but they did minimize it and turn voter wrath against the threat that slave owners would buy up the good farm lands wherever slavery was allowed. The realignment was powerful because it forced voters to switch parties, as typified by the rise and fall of the Know-Nothings, the rise of the Republican Party, and the splits in the Democratic Party.

=== Voting patterns by religion ===
Voting behavior by religion, northern USA, late 19th century
Religion	% Dem	% GOP
Immigrants
Irish Catholics	80	20
All Catholics	70	30
Confessional German Lutherans	65	35
German Reformed	60	40
French Canadian Catholics	50	50
Less Confessional German Lutherans	45	55
English Canadians	40	60
British stock	35	65
German Sectarians	30	70
Norwegian Lutherans	20	80
Swedish Lutherans	15	85
Haugean Norwegians	5	95
Natives
Northern stock
Quakers	5	95
Free Will Baptists	20	80
Congregational	25	75
Methodists	25	75
Regular Baptists	35	65
Blacks	40	60
Presbyterians	40	60
Episcopalians	45	55
Southern stock
Disciples	50	50
Presbyterians	70	30
Baptists	75	25
Methodists	90	10

Source: Kleppner, Paul (1979). The Third Electoral System 1853–1892. p. 182.

== Progressive era: 1890–1932 ==
=== Prohibition ===
In most of the country prohibition was of central importance in progressive politics before World War I, with a strong religious and ethnic dimension. Most pietistic Protestants were "dries" who advocated prohibition as a solution to social problems; they included Methodists, Congregationalists, Disciples, Baptists, Presbyterians, Quakers, and Scandinavian Lutherans. On the "wet" side, Episcopalians, Irish Catholics, German Lutherans and German Catholics attacked prohibition as a menace to their social customs and personal liberty. Prohibitionists supported direct democracy to enable voters to bypass the state legislature in lawmaking. In the North, the Republican Party championed the interests of the prohibitionists, while the Democratic Party represented ethnic group interests. In the South, the Baptist and Methodist churches played a major role in forcing the Democratic Party to support prohibition. After 1914 the issue shifted to the Germans' opposition to Woodrow Wilson's foreign policy. In the 1920s, however, the sudden, unexpected outburst of big city crime associated with bootlegging undermined support for prohibition, and the Democrats took up the cause for repeal, finally succeeding in 1932.

=== World War I ===
==== Protestants ====
Many different Protestant denominations, such as the Methodists and Baptists, loudly denounced the war at first: it was God's punishment for sin. Their moralism was aggressively focused on banishing evils (like saloons) from the face of the earth through Prohibition, and if they could be shown that German militarism was a similar evil, they would throw enormous weight. Wilson, the intensely religious son of a prominent theologian, knew exactly how to harness that moralism in his attacks on the "Huns" who threatened civilization, and his calls for an almost religious crusade on behalf of peace. The Episcopalians, with a strong base in the British-American community, generally supported entry into the war. President Woodrow Wilson appeal to the antiwar Protestants by arguing that American entry would make the war to end all wars, and eliminate militarism as a factor in world affairs.

==== Germania ====
German Americans by 1910 typically had only weak ties to Germany; however, they were fearful of negative treatment they might receive if the United States entered the war (such mistreatment was already happening to German-descent citizens in Canada and Australia). Almost none called for intervening on Germany's side, instead calling for neutrality and speaking of the superiority of German culture. As more nations were drawn into the conflict, however, the English-languages press increasingly supporting Britain, while the German-American media called for neutrality while also defending Germany's position. Chicago's Germans worked to secure a complete embargo on all arms shipments to Europe. In 1916 large crowds in Chicago's Germania celebrated the Kaiser's birthday, something they had not done before the war. German Americans in early 1917 still called for neutrality but proclaimed that if a war came they would be loyal to the United States. By this point they had been excluded almost entirely from national discourse on the subject. Once war started they were harassed in so many ways that historian Carl Wittke noted in 1936, it was "one of the most difficult and humiliating experiences suffered by an ethnic group in American history." German-American Socialists actively campaigned against entry into the war.

=== 1920s ===
The most important ethnocultural issues in politics included the congressional debates over restriction of immigration, the sudden rise (and sudden fall) of the Ku Klux Klan, and the role of Catholicism in the election of 1928.

==== Immigration restriction ====
The United States became more anti-immigration in outlook during this period. The American Immigration Act of 1924 limited immigration from countries where 2% of the total U.S. population, per the 1890 census, were immigrants from that country. Thus, the massive influx of Europeans that had come to America during the first two decades of the century slowed to a trickle. Asians were prohibited from immigrating altogether; that provision angered Japan. Although some businesses opposed restrictions because they wanted a continued flow of unskilled workers, support was widespread with the exception of the Jewish community.

==== Ku Klux Klan ====
The KKK was a nationwide organization that grew rapidly from 1921 to 1925 and collapsed just as fast. It had millions of members, but its organizational structure was oriented entirely toward recruiting new members, collecting their initiation fees and selling costumes. After the organizer moved on the local was poorly organized and unfunded and seldom achieved very much. The Klan signed up millions of white Protestant men on the basis that American society needed a moral purification against the immoral power of the Catholic Church, Jews, organized crime, speakeasies, and local adulterers. Liberal and Catholic elements fought against the Klan primarily inside the Democratic Party, where a motion to repudiate it by name was defeated by one vote at the national convention of 1924. KKK membership was secret. Members swore to uphold American values and Christian morality. At the local level, some Protestant ministers became involved, but no Protestant denomination officially endorsed the KKK.

Across the country, the Klan had strength in cities, towns and rural areas. Its high visibility made its intended targets of Catholics, Jews, and Blacks highly uncomfortable, and many local and state elections were bitterly fought around the role of the Klan. Historians in recent decades have totally revised the traditional interpretation of the second KKK as a terrorist group or one based on frustrated marginal elements. Using newly-discovered minutes of local chapters, they now portray the Klansmen as ordinary Americans, primarily of middle class. They were local activists and joiners who thought the nation was seriously threatened by an evil conspiracy. Scholars found the Klan of the 1920s was "composed of average citizens drawn from the broader middle-class." It "had been not a form of racial and religious terror but rather a means of mainstream political activism." The current KKK is a white supremacist organization.

==== 1928 election ====
1928 election was characterized by widespread attention to religious tensions between Catholics and Protestants, as well as the prohibition issue. The nation was peaceful and prosperous, giving enormous strength to Republican nominee Herbert Hoover. The Democratic candidate was New York Governor Al Smith, who was closely identified with Catholicism, New York City, and opposition to prohibition. Smith mobilized Catholic voters, who proved decisive in his success in carrying the large cities. Even so, a broad spectrum of Protestants was, in fact, concerned about the growing Catholic influence in American politics. Southern Baptists and Lutherans, among other denominations, often focused on religion. Smith lost many traditionally Protestant Democratic areas, especially in the border South. The final factor was New York City, a locale deeply distrusted by many average Americans for its unsavory reputation regarding organized crime.

Anti-Catholicism was a significant problem for Smith's campaign. Protestant ministers warned that he would take orders from the pope who, many Americans sincerely believed, would move to the United States to rule the country from a fortress in Washington, if Smith won. Beyond the conspiracy theories, a survey of 8,500 Southern Methodist Church ministers found only four who supported Smith, and the northern Methodists, Southern Baptists, and Disciples of Christ were similar in their opposition. Many average voters who sincerely rejected bigotry and the anti-Catholic Ku Klux Klan—which had declined during the 1920s until the 1928 campaign revived it—justified their opposition to Smith on their belief that the Catholic Church played too large a role in Smith's political record.

== New Deal era: 1932–1972 ==
Franklin D. Roosevelt led the Democratic Party to a landslide victory in 1932 and set up his New Deal in 1933 and forged a coalition of labor unions, liberals, religious, ethnic and racial minorities (Catholics, Jews and Blacks), Southern whites, poor people and those on relief. The organizational heft was provided by Big City machines, which gained access to millions of relief jobs and billions of dollars in spending projects. These voting blocs together formed a majority of voters and handed the Democratic Party seven victories out of nine presidential elections (1932–1948, 1960, 1964), as well as control of both houses of Congress during all but 4 years between the years 1932–1980 (Republicans won small majorities in 1946 and 1952). The cities were the center of the ethnic voting blocs, and Roosevelt built this coalition around them, as well as the big-city machines, and the labor unions that were associated with the ethnics. In 1936 the nation's 106 cities over 100,000 population voted 70% for FDR, compared to 59% outside the cities. Roosevelt won reelection in 1940 thanks to the cities. In the North, the cities over 100,000 gave Roosevelt 60% of their votes, while the rest of the North favored Wendell Willkie by 52%. It was just enough to provide the critical electoral college margin.

The European ethnic groups came of age after the 1960s. Ronald Reagan pulled many of the working class social conservatives into the Republican party as Reagan Democrats. Many middle class ethnics saw the Democratic Party as a working class party and preferred the GOP as the upper-middle class party. However, the Jewish community still voted en masse for the Democratic party, and in the 2004 presidential election 74% voted for Democratic candidate John Kerry, in the 2008 election 78% voted for President Barack Obama, and in the 2012 election 69% voted for President Obama. In the 2018 midterms, over 75% of Jews voted for Democrats.

African Americans grew stronger in their Democratic loyalties and in their numbers. By the 1960s, they were a much more important part of the coalition than in the 1930s. Their Democratic loyalties cut across all income and geographic lines to form the single most unified bloc of voters in the country.

== Present day ==
In the present-day, progressive Christians (often found in denominations such as the United Church of Christ or the Protestant Episcopal Church) tend to vote for the Democratic Party (cf. Christian left), while those aligned with the Christian right tend to vote for the Republican Party.

== APPENDICES: Voting ==
=== White Americans ===
Year	Candidate of the plurality	Political party	% of White vote	Result
1980	Ronald Reagan	Republican Party	56%	Won
1984	Ronald Reagan	Republican	66%	Won
1988	George H. W. Bush	Republican	59%	Won
1992	George H. W. Bush	Republican	40%	Lost
1996	Bob Dole	Republican	46%	Lost
2000	George W. Bush	Republican	55%	Won
2004	George W. Bush	Republican	58%	Won
2008	John McCain	Republican	55%	Lost
2012	Mitt Romney	Republican	59%	Lost
2016	Donald Trump	Republican	57%	Won
2020	Donald Trump	Republican	58%	Lost
2024	Donald Trump	Republican	57%	Won

=== Hispanic Americans ===
Year	Candidate of the plurality	Political party	% of Hispanic vote	Result
1976	Jimmy Carter	Democratic	74%	Won
1980	Jimmy Carter	Democratic	56%	Lost
1984	Walter Mondale	Democratic	61%	Lost
1988	Michael Dukakis	Democratic	69%	Lost
1992	Bill Clinton	Democratic	61%	Won
1996	Bill Clinton	Democratic	72%	Won
2000	Al Gore	Democratic	62%	Lost
2004	John Kerry	Democratic	58%	Lost
2008	Barack Obama	Democratic	67%	Won
2012	Barack Obama	Democratic	71%	Won
2016	Hillary Clinton	Democratic	65%	Lost
2020	Joe Biden	Democratic	63%	Won
2024	Kamala Harris	Democratic	52%	Lost

=== American Jews ===
Jewish vote to the Democratic Party in Presidential elections since 1916
Election year	Candidate of the Democratic Party	% of Jewish vote to the Democratic Party	Result of the Democratic Party
1916	Woodrow Wilson	55	Won
1920	James M. Cox	19	Lost
1924	John W. Davis	51	Lost
1928	Al Smith	72	Lost
1932	Franklin D. Roosevelt	82	Won
1936	Franklin D. Roosevelt	85	Won
1940	Franklin D. Roosevelt	90	Won
1944	Franklin D. Roosevelt	90	Won
1948	Harry Truman	75	Won
1952	Adlai Stevenson	64	Lost
1956	Adlai Stevenson	60	Lost
1960	John F. Kennedy	82	Won
1964	Lyndon B. Johnson	90	Won
1968	Hubert Humphrey	81	Lost
1972	George McGovern	65	Lost
1976	Jimmy Carter	71	Won
1980	Jimmy Carter	45	Lost
1984	Walter Mondale	67	Lost
1988	Michael Dukakis	64	Lost
1992	Bill Clinton	80	Won
1996	Bill Clinton	78	Won
2000	Al Gore	79	Lost
2004	John Kerry	76	Lost
2008	Barack Obama	78	Won
2012	Barack Obama	69	Won
2016	Hillary Clinton	71	Lost
2020	Joe Biden	77	Won
2024	Kamala Harris	63	Lost

=== Asian American ===
Year	Candidate of the plurality	Political party	% of asian vote	Result
1992	Bill Clinton	Democratic	30%	Won
1996	Bill Clinton	Democratic	43%	Won
2000	Al Gore	Democratic	55%	Lost
2004	John Kerry	Democratic	56%	Lost
2008	Barack Obama	Democratic	62%	Won
2012	Barack Obama	Democratic	73%	Won
2016	Hillary Clinton	Democratic	65%	Lost
2020	Joe Biden	Democratic	63%	Won
2024	Kamala Harris	Democratic	54%	Lost

=== African Americans ===
Year	Candidate of the plurality	Political party	% of black vote	Result
1976	Jimmy Carter	Democratic	82%	Won
1980	Jimmy Carter	Democratic	83%	Lost
1984	Walter Mondale	Democratic	91%	Lost
1988	Michael Dukakis	Democratic	89%	Lost
1992	Bill Clinton	Democratic	83%	Won
1996	Bill Clinton	Democratic	84%	Won
2000	Al Gore	Democratic	90%	Lost
2004	John Kerry	Democratic	88%	Lost
2008	Barack Obama	Democratic	95%	Won
2012	Barack Obama	Democratic	93%	Won
2016	Hillary Clinton	Democratic	88%	Lost
2020	Joe Biden	Democratic	87%	Won
2024	Kamala Harris	Democratic	85%	Lost

== See also ==
- American election campaigns in the 19th century
- Culture wars
- Realigning election
- Second Party System
- Third Party System
- Pietism § Impact on party voting in United States and Great Britain
- Votebank, in India
