= Waving the bloody shirt =

Political phrase of the US Reconstruction era

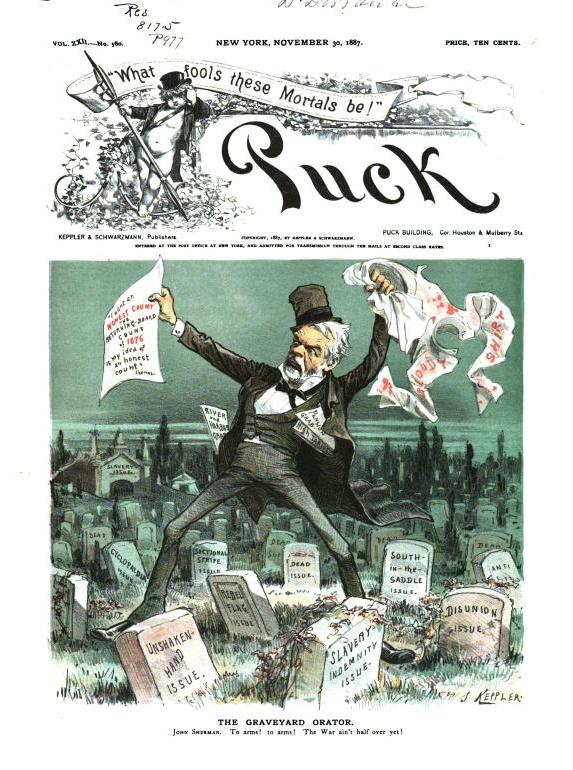
Puck cartoon ridiculing Republican Senator John Sherman for his use of "bloody shirt" memories of the Civil War in 1887, more than two decades after the war ended

"Waving the bloody shirt" and "bloody shirt campaign" were pejorative phrases, used during American election campaigns during the Reconstruction era, to deride politicians who, for political gain, evoked emotional memories and experiences of the Civil War or violence in its immediate aftermath. The phrases were most often used against Radical Republicans, who were accused of using the vivid and violent reminisces of the war to their political advantage. Democrats were not above using memories of the Civil War in such a manner as well, especially while campaigning in the South.

== Origin ==
Some historians believe the term originated from a supposed incident during the Civil War where future Populist presidential candidate James B. Weaver rallied troops in southern Iowa by holding up a bloody shirt of a preacher who had been whipped in Texas for trying to preach to slaves. The phrases gained popularity with a fictitious incident of April 1871 in which U.S. Representative and former Union general Benjamin Butler of Massachusetts, while making a speech on the floor of the U.S. House of Representatives, supposedly held up a shirt stained with the blood of a Reconstruction Era carpetbagger who had been whipped by the Ku Klux Klan. Although Butler did give a speech condemning the Klan that month, he never waved anyone's bloody shirt. White Southerners mocked Butler—using the fiction of his having "waved the bloody shirt”—to dismiss widespread Klan thuggery, murder, and other atrocities committed against freed slaves and Republicans. Although this supposed incident with Butler was false, the principle was real, and Republicans continued to argue for years after the Civil War that Democrats should not be elected because some Democrats had supported the Confederacy.

In the 1870s, Republicans would sometimes cast Democrats as traitors who would undo the results of the Civil War. One of these was Robert G. Ingersoll, a noted orator and Radical Republican, who blamed Democrats for all the horrors of the war and slavery: "Every man that tried to destroy this nation was a Democrat. Every enemy this great Republic has had for twenty years has been a Democrat. Every man that shot Union soldiers was a Democrat." The technique was effective throughout the decade, but its effectiveness began to fade with memories of the war. The Red Shirts, a defunct 19th-century white supremacist paramilitary organization, took their name from uniforms worn mocking the phrase.

The "Bloody Shirt" continued to be used in Republican campaigns through the end of the 1880s, with some Republican candidates going so far as to claim that Democrats were planning to secede again and start another Civil War. In 1884, the Republican slogan was Rum, Romanism and Rebellion, which referred to Democrats' role in the Civil War, as well as Democrats' support among Catholics and anti-Prohibitionists. Republicans would generally stop "waving the bloody shirt" in the 1890s as a new generation of Republican leaders like William McKinley and his fundraiser Mark Hanna felt the tactic had lost its effectiveness. As a congressman, McKinley helped to defeat the Lodge Bill of 1890, one of the Republican's last attempts at civil rights, by exchanging support for his McKinley Tariff in exchange for the Republicans dropping the voting rights bill. As president, McKinley continued to pursue a lenient policy towards the South and on civil rights; McKinley created a Confederate Memorial at Arlington National Cemetery and would do nothing when white supremacists overthrew the Wilmington, North Carolina city government in 1898.

In current usage, the terms are often shortened to bloody shirt and used more broadly to refer to any effort to stir up partisan animosity.
