= William Gienapp =

American historian (1944–2003)

William E. Gienapp (February 27, 1944 – October 29, 2003) was an American historian noted for his writing on the period of the American Civil War. His prize-winning The Origins of the Republican Party, 1852-1856 (1987) was based on original research and revised the traditional understanding of the political party's origins. Later he wrote Abraham Lincoln and Civil War America: A Biography (2002). He co-authored a widely used United States history textbook, Nation of Nations, and compiled one of the most widely used documentary readers on the era of the Civil War, The Civil War and Reconstruction: A Documentary Collection (2001).

== Education and career ==
Gienapp held a B.A. and Ph.D. from the University of California, Berkeley, where he studied under Kenneth Stampp, and an M.A. from Yale University. After earning his doctorate in 1980, Gienapp began working at the University of Wyoming. He became a visiting associate professor at Harvard in 1988 before formally joining the faculty the following year. Gienapp died prematurely in the fall of 2003 at the age of 59 from complications surrounding a rare form of blood cancer. He was survived by his wife and two sons.

During his tenure at Harvard University, Gienapp acquired a reputation as a teacher and mentor of graduate students. In addition to teaching popular courses on the American Civil War, Reconstruction, and antebellum America, he also taught a popular course on the history of baseball in the United States.

Many years after his death, his wife, Erica Gienapp, completed one of his final projects: The Civil War Diary of Gideon Welles, Lincoln's Secretary of the Navy: The Original Manuscript Edition (2014). It restored one of the most important primary sources of Abraham Lincoln's administration to its complete, original form.

Gienapp's major scholarly contribution was his analysis of how the Republican Party suddenly appeared on the scene and quickly dominated Northern politics. Scholars agree that it emerged from the great political realignment of the mid-1850s. Gienapp argues that the great realignment of the 1850s began before the Whig party collapse, and was caused not by politicians but by voters at the local level. The central forces were ethno-cultural, involving tensions between pietistic Protestants versus liturgical Catholics, Lutherans and Episcopalians regarding Catholicism, prohibition, and nativism. Anti-slavery did play a role but it was less important at first. The Know-Nothing party embodied the social forces at work, but its weak leadership was unable to solidify its organization, and the Republicans picked it apart. Nativism was so powerful that the Republicans could not avoid it, but they did minimize it and turn voter wrath against the threat that slave owners would buy up the good farm lands wherever slavery was allowed. The realignment was powerful because it forced voters to switch parties, as typified by the rise and fall of the Know-Nothings, the rise of the Republican Party, and the deep splits in the Democratic Party.

== Publications ==
- The Civil War Diary of Gideon Welles, Lincoln's Secretary of the Navy: The Original Manuscript Edition (University of Illinois Press, 2014), edited with Erica L. Gienapp.
- Abraham Lincoln and Civil War America: A Biography (Oxford University Press, 2002)
- This Fiery Trial: The Speeches and Writings of Abraham Lincoln (Oxford University Press, 2002), edited.
- The Civil War and Reconstruction: A Documentary Collection (W. W. Norton, 2001), edited.
- "The Crisis of American Democracy: The Political System and the Coming of the Civil War", in Gabor Boritt, ed. (1996). Why the Civil War Came. Oxford University Press. ISBN 0-19-507941-8.
- The Origins of the Republican Party, 1852-1856 (Oxford University Press, 1987)
- Nation of Nations: A Narrative History of the American Republic (McGraw-Hill/Alfred A. Knopf, 1990), contributor.
- "Nativism and the Creation of a Republican Majority in the North before the Civil War." Journal of American History 72.3 (1985), pp. 529–559. online
- "'Politics Seem to Enter into Everything': Political Culture in the North, 1840-1860," in Stephen E, Maizlish, ed., Essays on American Antebellum Politics, 1840-1860 (Texas A&M University Press, 1982), pp. 14–69. online.
