= Second Party System =

Phase in U.S. electoral politics (1828–1854)

- 1828–1860
- United States presidential election results between 1828 and 1852. Blue shaded states usually voted for the Democratic Party, while buff shaded states usually voted for the Anti-Jacksonian parties (National Republican/Anti-Masonic/Whig/Nullifier).

The Second Party System was the political party system operating in the United States from about 1828 to 1860, after the First Party System ended. The system was characterized by rapidly rising levels of voter interest, beginning in 1824, as demonstrated by Election Day turnouts, rallies, partisan newspapers, and high degrees of personal loyalty to parties.

Two major parties dominated the political landscape: the Democratic Party, led by Andrew Jackson, and the Whig Party, assembled by Henry Clay from the National Republicans and from other opponents of Jackson. Minor parties included the Anti-Masonic Party, an important innovator from 1827 to 1834; the abolitionist Liberty Party in 1840; and the anti-slavery expansion Free Soil Party in 1848 and 1852. The Second Party System reflected and shaped the political, social, economic and cultural currents of the Jacksonian Era, until succeeded by the Third Party System.

This party system materialized from two realignments in 1824. The first realignment was of various Democratic-Republican voting blocs realigning into the newly-formed Democratic Party, which acted as a successor to the entire Democratic-Republican Party as the conservative party of the South's more slave sparse areas and the non-Coastal Northern counties. The second realignment in 1824 was of leftover Federalist-aligned voters who formed the Clay and John Quincy Adams factions in the Coastal North, realigning into the National Republican Party in 1828.

This northern base of National Republicans in the Coastal North, alongside the wealthy slave owners of the Southern slave centers and the Anti-Masons in Vermont, Massachusetts, upstate New York and Pennsylvania, realigned into the newly formed Whig Party in 1836. With the fall of the Whig Party in 1856, the remaining Whig coalition (those not affected by the Free Soil movement in New England and the Great Lakes Region) realigned into the Know Nothing ticket that same year then realigned into the Constitutional Union Party in 1856 at the start of the next party system.

Frank Towers specifies an important ideological divide was that "Democrats stood for the 'sovereignty of the people' as expressed in popular demonstrations, constitutional conventions, and majority rule as a general principle of governing, whereas Whigs advocated the rule of law, written and unchanging constitutions, and protections for minority interests against majority tyranny."

== Patterns ==
Historian Richard P. McCormick is most responsible for defining the term. He stated:

- It was a distinct party system.
- It was produced by leaders trying to win the presidency, with contenders building their own national coalitions.
- Regional effects strongly affected developments, with the Adams forces strongest in New England and the Jacksonians in the Southwest.
- For the first time, two-party politics were extended to the South and West (which had been one-party regions).
- In each region, the two parties were about equal — the first and only party system showing such.
- Because of the regional balance, it was vulnerable to region-specific issues (like slavery).
- The same two parties appeared in every state, and contested both the electoral vote and state offices.
- Most critical was the abrupt emergence of a two-party South in 1832–1834 (mostly as a reaction against Van Buren).
- The Anti-Masonic party flourished in only those states with a weak second party.
- Methods varied somewhat but everywhere the political convention replaced the caucus.
- The parties had an interest of their own, in terms of the office-seeking goals of party activists.
- The System brought forth a new, popular campaign style.
- Close elections—not charismatic candidates or particular issues—brought out the voters.
- Party leaders formed the parties to some degree in their own image.

== Leaders ==
Among the best-known figures on the Democratic side were: Andrew Jackson, Martin Van Buren, John C. Calhoun, James K. Polk, Lewis Cass, and Stephen Douglas. On the Whig side were John Quincy Adams, Henry Clay, Daniel Webster, William H. Seward, and Thurlow Weed. According to historian Robert Remini:

Van Buren's creative contribution to the political development of the nation was enormous, and as such he earned his way to the presidency. After gaining control of New York's Republican Party he organized the Albany Regency to run the state in his absence while he pursued a national career in Washington. The Regency was a governing consul in Albany consisting of a group of politically astute and highly intelligent men. He was one of the first statewide political machines in the country was success resulted from its professional use of patronage, the legislative caucus, and the official party newspaper.....[In Washington] he labored to bring about the reorganization of the Republican Party through an alliance between what he called "the planters of the South and the plain Republicans of the North."... Heretofore parties were regarded as evils to be tolerated; Van Buren argued that the party system was the most sensible and intelligent way the affairs of the nation could be democratically conducted, a viewpoint that eventually won national approval.

== Origins ==
The 1824 presidential election operated without political parties and came down to a four-man race. Each candidate (Henry Clay, William Crawford, Andrew Jackson, and John Quincy Adams), all of whom were nominally Democratic Republicans, had a regional base of support involving factions in the various states. With no electoral college majority, the choice devolved on the United States House of Representatives. Clay was not among the three finalists, but as Speaker of the House he negotiated the settlement. Jackson, despite having won the most popular votes and the most electoral votes, was not elected. John Quincy Adams, son of former President John Adams, was elected, and he immediately chose Clay as Secretary of State.

Jackson loudly denounced this "corrupt bargain." Campaigning vigorously he launched a crusade against the corruption he saw in Washington. Appealing both to local militia companies (as the most famous of the nation's Indian fighters, and a hero of the War of 1812) and to state political factions, Jackson assembled a coalition, the embryonic Democratic Party, that ousted Adams in 1828. Martin Van Buren, brilliant leader of New York politics, was Jackson's key aide, bringing along the many electoral votes of Virginia and Pennsylvania. His reward was appointment as Secretary of State and later nomination and election to the vice presidency as heir to the Jacksonian tradition. The Adams-Clay wing of the Democratic-Republican Party became known as the National Republicans, although Adams never considered himself a loyal member of the party.

As Norton explains the Jacksonian triumph in 1828:

Jacksonians believed the people's will had finally prevailed. Through a lavishly financed coalition of state parties, political leaders, and newspaper editors, a popular movement had elected the president. The Democrats became the nation's first well-organized national party ... and tight party organization became the hallmark of nineteenth-century American politics.

Behind the platforms issued by state and national parties stood a widely shared political outlook that characterized the Democrats:

The Democrats represented a wide range of views but shared a fundamental commitment to the Jeffersonian concept of an agrarian society. They viewed the central government as the enemy of individual liberty. The 1824 "corrupt bargain" had strengthened their suspicion of Washington politics. ... Jacksonians feared the concentration of economic and political power. They believed that government intervention in the economy benefited special-interest groups and created corporate monopolies that favored the rich. They sought to restore the independence of the individual--the artisan and the ordinary farmer--by ending federal support of banks and corporations and restricting the use of paper currency, which they distrusted. Their definition of the proper role of government tended to be negative, and Jackson's political power was largely expressed in negative acts. He exercised the veto more than all previous presidents combined. Jackson and his supporters also opposed reform as a movement. Reformers eager to turn their programs into legislation called for a more active government. But Democrats tended to oppose programs like educational reform and the establishment of a public education system. They believed, for instance, that public schools restricted individual liberty by interfering with parental responsibility and undermined freedom of religion by replacing church schools. Nor did Jackson share reformers' humanitarian concerns. He had no sympathy for American Indians, initiating the removal of the Cherokees along the Trail of Tears.

Historians have examined the emergence of the Second Party System at the local level. For example, Bruce Bendler argues that in New Jersey the same dramatic changes that were reshaping the rest of the country were especially pointed in that state in the 1820s. A new political system emerged by the end of the decade as voters polarized in support or opposition to Jackson. Furthermore, the "Market Revolution" was well underway, as industrialization and upgraded transportation networks made the larger picture more important than the local economy, and entrepreneurs and politicians became leaders in speeding up the changes. For example, William N. Jeffers of Salem County, New Jersey, built his political success on leadership with the Jacksonian forces at the local level, while at the same time building his fortune with a bank charter and building a steam mill.

== Jackson: Bank War ==
Jackson considered himself a reformer, but he was committed to the old ideals of Republicanism, and bitterly opposed anything that smacked of special favors for special interests. While Jackson never engaged in a duel as president, he had shot political opponents before and was just as determined to destroy his enemies on the battlefields of politics. The Second Party System came about primarily because of Jackson's determination to destroy the Second Bank of the United States. Headquartered in Philadelphia, with offices in major cities around the country, the federally chartered Bank operated somewhat like a central bank (like the Federal Reserve System a century later). Local bankers and politicians annoyed by the controls exerted by Nicholas Biddle grumbled loudly. Jackson did not like any banks (paper money was anathema to Jackson; he believed only gold and silver ["specie"] should circulate.) After Herculean battles with Henry Clay, his chief antagonist, Jackson finally broke Biddle's bank.

Jackson continued to attack the banking system. His Specie Circular of July 1836 rejected paper money issued by banks (it could no longer be used to buy federal land), insisting on gold and silver coins. Most businessmen and bankers (but not all) went over to the Whig party, and the commercial and industrial cities became Whig strongholds. Jackson meanwhile became even more popular with the subsistence farmers and day laborers who distrusted bankers and finance.

Economic historians have explored the high degree of financial and economic instability in the Jacksonian era. For the most part, they follow the conclusions of Peter Temin, who absolved Jackson's policies, and blamed international events beyond American control, such as conditions in Mexico, China and Britain. A survey of economic historians in 1995 show that the vast majority concur with Temin's conclusion that "the inflation and financial crisis of the 1830s had their origin in events largely beyond President Jackson's control and would have taken place whether or not he had acted as he did vis-a-vis the Second Bank of the U.S."

=== Spoils System ===
Jackson systematically used the federal patronage system, that was called the Spoils System. Jackson not only rewarded past supporters; he promised future jobs if local and state politicians joined his team. As Professor Syrett explains: When Jackson became president, he implemented the theory of rotation in office, declaring it "a leading principle in the republican creed." He believed that rotation in office would prevent the development of a corrupt civil service. On the other hand, Jackson's supporters wanted to use the civil service to reward party loyalists to make the party stronger. In practice, this meant replacing civil servants with friends or party loyalists into those offices. The spoils system did not originate with Jackson. It originated under Thomas Jefferson when he removed Federalist office-holders after taking office. Also, Jackson did not out the entire civil service. At the end of his term, Jackson had only dismissed less than twenty percent of the original civil service. While Jackson did not start the spoils system, he did encourage its growth and it became a central feature of the Second Party System, as well as the Third Party System, until it ended in the 1890s. As one historian explains:

"Although Jackson dismissed far fewer government employees than most of his contemporaries imagined and although he did not originate the spoils system, he made more sweeping changes in the Federal bureaucracy than had any of his predecessors. What is even more significant is that he defended these changes as a positive good. At present when the use of political patronage is generally considered an obstacle to good government, it is worth remembering that Jackson and his followers invariably described rotation in public office as a "reform." In this sense the spoils system was more than a way to reward Jackson's friends and punish his enemies; it was also a device for removing from public office the representatives of minority political groups that Jackson insisted had been made corrupt by their long tenure."

== Modernizing Whigs ==
Both parties having a common ancestor, the Whigs and Democrats agreed on many basic principles—they were both strongly committed to the ideals of Republicanism in the United States. In most of the United States, the Whigs were more upscale, better educated, more urban, and more entrepreneurial; the Democrats were strongest on the frontier and in subsistence farming areas. Catholic immigrants, especially Irish and German, were heavily and enthusiastically Democratic, while evangelical Protestants and English and Scots-Irish immigrants were typically Whigs. As Norton explains, there were major policy differences:

Whigs favored economic expansion through an activist government, Democrats through limited central government. Whigs supported corporate charters, a national bank, and paper currency; Democrats were opposed to all three. Whigs also favored more humanitarian reforms than did Democrats, including public schools, abolition of capital punishment, prison and asylum reform and temperance. Whigs were more optimistic than Democrats, generally speaking, and more enterprising. They did not object to helping a specific group if doing so would promote the general welfare. The chartering of corporations, they argued, expanded economic opportunity for everyone, laborers and farmers alike. Democrats, distrustful of concentrated economic power and of moral and economic coercion, held fast to the Jeffersonian principle of limited government.

Meanwhile, economic modernizers, bankers, businessmen, commercial farmers, many of whom were already National Republicans, and Southern planters angry at Jackson's approach to the nullification crisis were mobilized into a new anti-Jackson force; they called themselves Whigs. Just as the Whigs of 1776 were patriots who battled the tyranny of King George III, so too the new party saw itself battling "King Andrew". In the northeast, a moralistic crusade against the highly secretive Masonic order matured into a regular political party, the Anti-Masons, which soon combined with the Whigs. Jackson fought back by aggressive use of federal patronage, by timely alliances with local leaders, and with a rhetoric that identified the Bank and its agents as the greatest threat to the republican spirit. Eventually his partisans called themselves "Democrats." The Whigs had an elaborate program for modernizing the economy. To stimulate the creation of new factories, they proposed a high tariff on imported manufactured goods.

The Democrats said that would fatten the rich; the tariff should be low—for "revenue only" (thus not to foster manufacturing). Whigs argued that banks and paper money were needed; the Democrats countered that no honest man wants them. Public works programs to build roads, canals and railroads would give the country the infrastructure it needed for rapid economic development, said the Whigs. Democrats replied they did not want that kind of complex change. Rather the Democrats called for more of the same—especially more farms to raise the families in the traditional style. More land is needed for that, Democrats said, so they pushed for expansion south and west. Jackson conquered Florida for the US. Over intense Whig opposition, his political heir, James Polk (1845–49) added Texas, the Southwest, California, and Oregon. Next on the Democratic agenda would be Cuba.

In most cities the rich men were solidly Whig—85-90% of the men worth over $100,000 in Boston and New York City voted Whig. In rural America, the Whigs were stronger in market towns and commercial areas, and the Democrats stronger on the frontier and in more isolated areas. Ethnic and religious communities usually went the same way, with Irish and German Catholics heavily Democratic, and pietistic Protestants more Whiggish.

== Democratization ==
Gienapp (1982) points out that the American political system underwent fundamental change after 1820 under the rubric of Jacksonian democracy. While Jackson himself did not initiate the changes, he took advantage in 1828 and symbolized many of the changes. For the first time politics assumed a central role in voters' lives. Before then deference to upper class elites, and general indifference most of the time, characterized local politics across the country. The suffrage laws were not at fault for they allowed mass participation for white men; rather few men were interested in politics before 1828, and fewer still voted or became engaged because politics did not seem important. Changes followed the psychological shock of the panic of 1819, and the 1828 election of Andrew Jackson, with his charismatic personality and controversial policies. By 1840, Gienapp argues, the revolution was complete: "With the full establishment of the second party system, campaigns were characterized by appeals to the common man, mass meetings, parades, celebrations, and intense enthusiasm, while elections generated high voter participation. In structure and ideology, American politics had been democratized."

== Party strategies ==
Both parties relied heavily on their national network of newspapers. Some editors were the key political players in their states, and most of them filled their papers with useful information on rallies and speeches and candidates, as well as the text of major speeches and campaign platforms.

=== Party strengths ===
The Whigs built a strong party organization in most states; they were weak only on the frontier. They were strongest in the Northeast and among business, merchants, commercial farmers, and professionals. The Whigs used newspapers effectively, and soon adopted the exciting campaign techniques that lured 75 to 85% of the eligible voters to the polls. Abraham Lincoln emerged early as the leader in Illinois—where he usually was bested by an even more talented politician, Stephen Douglas. While Douglas and the Democrats were somewhat behind the Whigs in newspaper work, they made up for this weakness by emphasis on party loyalty. Anyone who attended a Democratic convention, from precinct level to national level, was honor bound to support the final candidate, whether he liked him or not. This rule produced numerous schisms, but on the whole the Democrats controlled and mobilized their rank and file more effectively than the Whigs did.

=== Whig weaknesses ===
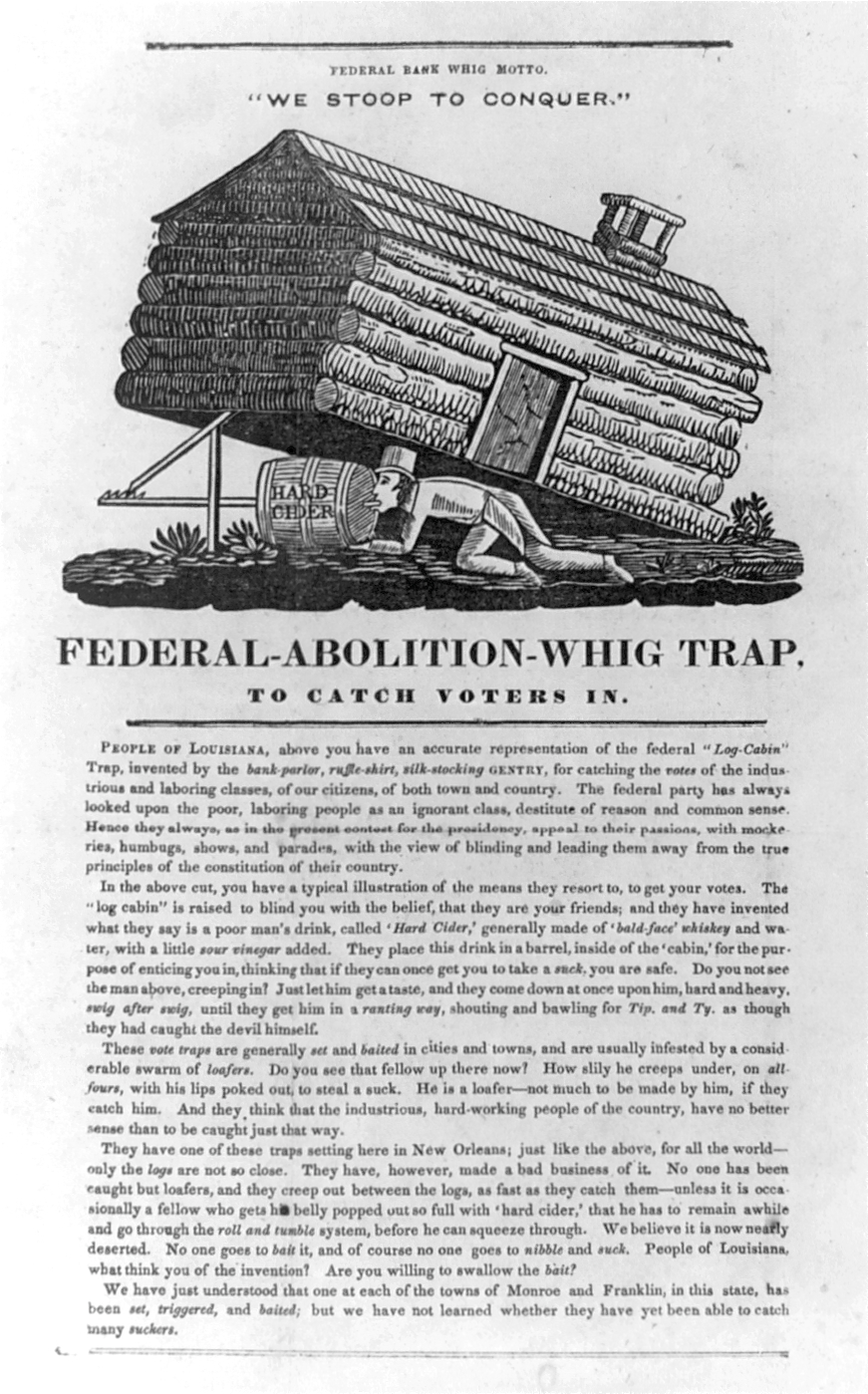
Democratic poster in 1840 warning that Whigs' Log Cabin campaign was a trap for poor people

One fundamental weakness was its inability to take a position on slavery. As a coalition of Northern National Republicans and Southern Nullifiers, Whigs in each of the two regions held opposing views on slavery. Therefore, the Whig party was only able to conduct successful campaigns as long as the slavery issue was ignored.

By the early 1850s, the question of slavery dominated the political landscape, and the Whigs, unable to agree on an approach to the issue, began to disintegrate. A few Whigs lingered, claiming that, with the alternatives being a pro-Northern Republican party and a pro-Southern Democratic party, they were the only political party that could preserve the Union. In 1856, the remaining Whigs endorsed the Know Nothing campaign of Millard Fillmore and in 1860 they endorsed the Constitutional Union ticket of John Bell, but, with the outbreak of the Civil War in 1861, the Whig party ceased to exist.

Most of the prominent men in most towns and cities were Whigs, and they controlled local offices and judgeships, in addition to many state offices. Thus the outcome of the political process was mixed. In Springfield, Illinois, a strong Whig enclave in a Democratic region, poll books that show how individuals voted indicates the rise of the Whigs took place in 1836 in opposition to the presidential candidacy of Martin Van Buren and was consolidated in 1840. Springfield Whigs tend to validate historical studies elsewhere: they were largely native-born, either in New England or Kentucky, professional men or farm owners, and devoted to partisan organization. Abraham Lincoln's career mirrors the Whigs' political rise, but by the 1840s Springfield began to fall into the hands of the Democrats, as immigrants changed the city's political makeup. By the 1860 presidential election, Lincoln was barely able to win the city.

=== Democrats dominant in 1852 ===
By the 1850s most Democratic party leaders had accepted many Whiggish ideas, and no one could deny the economic modernization of factories and railroads was moving ahead rapidly. The old economic issues died about the same time old leaders like Calhoun, Webster, Clay, Jackson and Polk passed from the scene. New issues, especially the questions of slavery, nativism and religion came to the fore. 1848 was the last hurrah for the Whigs; everyone realized they could win only if the Democrats split in two candidatures. With the healing of the Free Soil revolt after 1852, Democratic dominance seemed assured. The Whigs went through the motions, but both rank and file and leaders quietly dropped out. The Third Party System was ready to emerge.

== See also ==
- List of United States House of Representatives elections (1824–1854)
- Party systems in the United States
- American election campaigns in the 19th century
- List of United States political catchphrases, slogans and rhetoric
- Anti-Nebraska Party – created in 1854 in response to the Kansas–Nebraska Act
- Political parties in the United States
- Political history in the United States, for historiography

== Bibliography ==
=== References ===
- Finkelman, Paul, and Peter Wallenstein, eds. The encyclopedia of American political history (CQ Press, 2001).
- Greene, Jack B. Encyclopedia of American Political History (1983)
- Kazin, Michael. What It Took to Win: A History of the Democratic Party (2022) online
- Kazin, Michael. ed. The Princeton Encyclopedia of American Political History (2 vol. Princeton UP, 2009)
  - Kazin, Michael. ed. The Concise Princeton Encyclopedia of American Political History (Princeton UP, 2011)
- LeMay, Michael C. The American Political Party System: A Reference Handbook (ABC-CLIO 2017)
- Maisel, L. Sandy, and Jeffrey M. Berry (eds.) The Oxford Handbook of American Political Parties and Interest Groups (Oxford University Press, 2010).
- Maisel, L. Sandy, and Charles Bassett (eds.) Political Parties & Elections in the United States: An Encyclopedia (2 vols., Garland, 1991)
- Schlesinger, Arthur Jr., ed. History of American Presidential Elections, 1789–2008 (2011) 3 vol and 11 vol editions; detailed analysis of each election, with primary documents; online v. 1. 1789-1824 -- v. 2. 1824-1844 -- v. 3. 1848-1868 -- v. 4. 1872-1888 -- v. 5. 1892-1908 -- v. 6. 1912-1924 -- v. 7. 1928-1940 -- v. 8. 1944-1956 -- v. 9. 1960-1968 -- v. 10. 1972-1984 -- v. 11. 1988-2001
- Schlesinger, Arthur M. Jr. ed. History of U.S. Political Parties 1789-1972 (1992) Vol. 1, Covers all the major and minor political parties, along with primary sources

=== Specialized topics ===
- Altschuler, Glenn C.; Blumin, Stuart M. (1997). "Limits of Political Engagement in Antebellum America: A New Look at the Golden Age of Participatory Democracy". Journal of American History. 84 (3): 878–79. doi:10.2307/2953083. JSTOR 2953083. in JSTOR
- Altschuler, Glenn C. and Stuart M. Blumin. Rude Republic: Americans and Their Politics in the Nineteenth Century (2000)
- Ambler, Charles H. Sectionalism in Virginia from 1776 to 1861 (1910) full text online
- Ashworth, John. "Agrarians" & "aristocrats": Party political ideology in the United States, 1837-1846 (1983)
- Baker, Jean (1983). Affairs of Party: The Political Culture of Northern Democrats in the Mid-Nineteenth Century.
- Belko, William S. "Toward the Second American Party System: Southern Jacksonians, the Election of 1832, and the Rise of the Democratic Party." Ohio Valley History 14.1 (2014): 28–50. online
- Bolt, William K. Tariff Wars and the Politics of Jacksonian America (2017) covers 1816 to 1861. PhD dissertation version
- Brooks, Corey M. Liberty Power: Antislavery Third Parties and the Transformation of American Politics (U of Chicago Press, 2016). 302 pp.
- Brown, Thomas (1985). Politics and Statesmanship: Essays on the American Whig Party.
- Brown, David (Fall 1999). Jeffersonian Ideology And The Second Party System. Vol. 62. pp. 17–44.
- Brooks, Corey M. and Beau C. Tremitiere. "Fusing to Combat Slavery: Third-Party Politics in the Pre-Civil War North" St. John's Law Review 98#2 (2024) pp. 339–373 online
- Brooks, Corey M. Liberty power: antislavery third parties and the transformation of American politics (U of Chicago Press, 2019).
- Carwardine Richard. Evangelicals and Politics in Antebellum America (Yale UP, 1993).
- Cheathem, Mark R. The Coming of Democracy: Presidential Campaigning in the Age of Jackson (2018)
- Cheathem, Mark R. and Terry Corps, eds. Historical Dictionary of the Jacksonian Era and Manifest Destiny (2nd ed. 2016), 544pp
- Compton, John W. "Where Do Policy Demanders Come From? Protestants and Party Formation in the Antebellum Period." Political Science Quarterly (2026): online
- Dinkin, Robert J. Campaigning in America: A History of Election Practices. (Greenwood, 1989)
- Ellis, Richard J. Old Tip vs. the Sly Fox: The 1840 Election and the Making of a Partisan Nation (U of Kansas Press, 2020) online review
- Eyal, Yonatan. The Young America Movement and the Transformation of the Democratic Party, 1828–1861, (2007)
- Foner, Eric (1970). Free Soil, Free Labor, Free Men: The Ideology of the Republican Party before the Civil War.
- Formisano, Ronald P. (Winter 1969). "Political Character, Antipartyism, and the Second Party System". American Quarterly. 21 (4). American Quarterly, Vol. 21, No. 4: 683–709. doi:10.2307/2711603. JSTOR 2711603. in JSTOR
- Formisano, Ronald P. (June 1974). "Deferential-Participant Politics: The Early Republic's Political Culture, 1789–1840". American Political Science Review. 68 (2). The American Political Science Review, Vol. 68, No. 2: 473–87. doi:10.2307/1959497. JSTOR 1959497. S2CID 146879756.in JSTOR
- Gienapp, William E. " 'Politics Seem To Enter into Everything': Political Culture in the North, 1840-1860," in Stephen E. Maizlish, ed., Essays on American Antebellum Politics, 1840-1860. (Texas A&M University Press, 1982) pp.14-69.
- Gienapp, William E. The origins of the Republican Party, 1852-1856 (Oxford University Press, 1987). online
- Hammond, Bray. Banks and Politics in America from the Revolution to the Civil War (1960), Pulitzer prize; the standard history. Pro-Bank
- Heale, M.J. The Presidential Quest: Candidates and Images in American Political Culture, 1787-1852 (1982)
- Hofstadter, Richard (1969). The Idea of a Party System: The Rise of Legitimate Opposition in the United States, 1780–1840. Berkeley.
- Holt, Michael F. (1992). Political Parties and American Political Development: From the Age of Jackson to the Age of Lincoln.
- Holt, Michael F. (1999). The Rise and Fall of the American Whig Party: Jacksonian Politics and the Onset of the Civil War. Oxford UP. ISBN 0-19-505544-6.
- Holt, Michael F. "The Antimasonic and Know Nothing Parties," in History of U.S. Political Parties, ed. Arthur M. Schlesinger Jr. (4 vols., 1973), I, 575–620.
- Howe, Daniel Walker. What Hath God Wrought: The Transformation of America, 1815-1848 (Oxford UP, 2009); Pulitzer Prize
- Howe, Daniel Walker (March 1991). "The Evangelical Movement and Political Culture during the Second Party System". Journal of American History. 77 (4). The Journal of American History, Vol. 77, No. 4: 1216–39. doi:10.2307/2078260. JSTOR 2078260.
- Jaenicke, D.W. "The Jacksonian Integration of Parties into the Constitutional System," Political Science Quarterly, (1986), 101:65-107. fulltext in JSTOR
- Jensen, Richard. "Second Party System," in Encyclopedia of the United States in the Nineteenth Century (Scribner's, 2001)
- Kruman, Marc W. (Winter 1992). "The Second Party System and the Transformation of Revolutionary Republicanism". Journal of the Early Republic. 12 (4). Journal of the Early Republic, Vol. 12, No. 4: 509–37. doi:10.2307/3123876. JSTOR 3123876.

- Lowrey, Frank Mitchell, III. "Tennessee Voters During the Second Two-Party System,. 1836-1860: A Study in Voter Constancy and in Socio-Economic and Demographic Distinctions " (PhD dissertation, U of Alabama; ProQuest Dissertations Publishing, 1973. 7327310).
- Marshall, Lynn. (January 1967). "The Strange Stillbirth of the Whig Party". American Historical Review. 72 (2). The American Historical Review, Vol. 72, No. 2: 445–68. doi:10.2307/1859236. JSTOR 1859236.
- McCarthy, Charles. The Antimasonic Party: A Study of Political Anti-Masonry in the United States, 1827-1840, in the Report of the American Historical Association for 1902 (1903)
- McCormick, Richard L. (1986). The Party Period and Public Policy: American Politics from the Age of Jackson to the Progressive Era.
- McCormick, R. P. (1967), "Political Development and the Party System," in W. N. Chambers and W. D. Burnham, eds. The American Party Systems (1967)
- Meardon, Stephen. "From Religious Revivals to Tariff Rancor: Preaching Free Trade and Protection during the Second American Party System," History of Political Economy, Winter 2008 Supplement, Vol. 40, pp 265–298
- Meyers, Marvin. The Jacksonian Persuasion: Politics and Belief (1957)
- Parsons, Lynn H. The Birth of Modern Politics: Andrew Jackson, John Quincy Adams, and the Election of 1828 (2009) excerpt and text search
- Pessen, Edward (1977). The Many-Faceted Jacksonian Era: New Interpretations.
- Pessen, Edward (1978). Jacksonian America: Society, Personality, and Politics.
- Pfau, Michael William. "Conventions or Deliberation? Convention Addresses and Deliberative Containment in the Second Party System," Rhetoric and Public Affairs, (2006) 9#4 pp 635–654 online.
- Ratcliffe, Donald J. "The nullification crisis, southern discontents, and the American political process." American Nineteenth Century History 1.2 (2000): 1-30.
- Renda, Lex. "Richard P. McCormick and the Second American Party System," Reviews in American History, June 95, Vol. 23 Issue 2, pp 378–89
- Schlesinger, Arthur M. Jr. The Age of Jackson (1945) intellectual history focused on big city workers; Pulitzer Prize online
- Sellers, Charles. The Market Revolution: Jacksonian America, 1815-1846 (1991.)
- Shade, William G. "Politics and Parties in Jacksonian America," Pennsylvania Magazine of History and Biography Vol. 110, No. 4 (Oct., 1986), pp. 483–507 online
- Shade, William G. "The Second Party System" in Paul Kleppner, et al. Evolution of American Electoral Systems (1983) pp 77–112. online
- Sharp, James Roger. The Jacksonians Versus the Banks: Politics in the States after the Panic of 1837 (1970)
- Shelden, Rachel A. "The Politics of Continuity and Change in the Long Civil War Era." Civil War History 65.4 (2019): 319–341. covers 1828 to 1900.
- Silbey, Joel H. (2014). A Companion to the Antebellum Presidents 1837-1861. Wiley. ISBN 9781118609293.
- Silbey, Joel H. (1991). The American Political Nation, 1838–1893.
- Silbey, Joel H. Party Over Section: The Rough and Ready Presidential Election of 1848 (2009), 205 pp.
- Trainor, Sean. Gale Researcher Guide for: The Second Party System (Gale, Cengage Learning, 2018).
- Van Deusen, Glyndon (1973). "The Whig Party". In Arthur M. Schlesinger, Jr. (ed.). History of U.S. Political Parties. Chelsea House Publications. pp. 1:331–63. ISBN 0-7910-5731-3.
- Van Deusen, Glyndon G. The Jacksonian Era: 1828- 1848 (1959) online
- Vaughn, William Preston (1983) The Antimasonic Party in the United States, 1826-1843. UP of Kentucky. ISBN 0-8131-1474-8
- Waldstreicher, David. (2010). "The Birth of Modern Politics: Andrew Jackson, John Quincy Adams, and the Election of 1828./Vindicating Andrew Jackson: The 1828 Election and the Rise of the Two Party System," Journal of the Early Republic, Vol. 30 Issue 4, pp 674–678
- Watson, Harry L. Liberty and Power: The Politics of Jacksonian America (1990) (ISBN 0-374-52196-4)
- Wilentz, Sean. "On Class and Politics in Jacksonian America" Reviews in American History, Vol. 10, No. 4, (Dec., 1982) pp. 45–63 online
- Wilentz, Sean. The Rise of American Democracy: Jefferson to Lincoln (2006) excerpt and text search
- Wilson, Major L. Space, Time, and Freedom: The Quest for Nationality and the Irrepressible Conflict, 1815-1861 (2013) intellectual history of Whigs and Democrats

=== Biographical ===
- Brands, H. W. (2005) Andrew Jackson: His Life and Times
- Cole, Donald B. (1984). Martin Van Buren and the American Political System
- Foner, Eric. "Lincoln, the Law, and the Second Party System," in The Fiery Trial: Abraham Lincoln and American Slavery (2010) ch 2
- Johannsen, Robert W. Stephen A. Douglas (1997).
- Leahy, Christopher J. "President without a Party: The Life of John Tyler" (LSU, 2020), a major scholarly biography; excerpt also online review
- Remini, Robert V. (1998). The Life of Andrew Jackson, abridged version of his 3-volume biography
- Remini, Robert V. (1959). Martin Van Buren and the Making of the Democratic Party.
- Remini, Robert V. (1991). Henry Clay: Statesman for the Union. W. W. Norton & Company. ISBN 0-393-31088-4.
- Remini, Robert V. (1997). Daniel Webster.
- Syrett, Harold C. Andrew Jackson: His Contribution to the American Tradition
- Van Deusen, Glyndon G. The life of Henry Clay (1979) online
- Van Deusen, Glyndon G. Thurlow Weed, Wizard of the Lobby (1947) online

=== Regional, state, local studies ===
- Cole, Arthur Charles. The Whig party in the South (1913) online
- Formisano, Ronald P. (1971). The Birth of Mass Political Parties: Michigan, 1827-1861
- Formisano, Ronald P. (1983). The Transformation of Political Culture: Massachusetts Parties, 1790s–1840s.
- McCormick, Richard P. (1966). The Second American Party System: Party Formation in the Jacksonian Era., covers each state. online
- Mueller, Henry R. The Whig Party in Pennsylvania (1922) online
- Ratcliffe, Donald J. The Politics of Long Division: The Birth of the Second Party System in Ohio, 1818-1828. (2000). 455 pp.
- Wallace, Michael. "Changing Concepts of Party in the United States: New York, 1815-1828." American Historical Review 74.2 (1968): 453–491. online; also in JSTOR
- Walton, Brian G. "The Second Party System in Arkansas, 1836-1848." Arkansas Historical Quarterly 28.2 (1969): 120–155. online
- Winkle, Kenneth J. "The Second Party System in Lincoln's Springfield." Civil War History (1998) 44(4): 267–284. ISSN 0009-8078

=== Primary sources ===
- Blau, Joseph L. ed. Social Theories of Jacksonian Democracy: Representative Writings of the Period 1825-1850 (1947), 386 pages of excerpts
- Hammond, J. D. History of Political Parties in the State of New York (2 vols., Albany, 1842).
- Rasmussen, Hans. "Civil War Treasures: The Ways of the Whigs: Campaign Materials from the Second Party System." Civil War Book Review 24.1 (2022): 3+ online.
- Howe, Daniel Walker (1973). The American Whigs: An Anthology.
