= Political realignment =

Dramatic change in a political system

A political realignment is a set of sharp changes in party-related ideology, issues, leaders, regional bases, demographic bases, and/or the structure of power within a government. In political science and political history, this is often called a critical election, critical realignment, or realigning election. These changes restructure political focus and power for decades, usually replacing an older dominant coalition. Scholars frequently invoke the concept in American elections, where it is most common, though it also occurs in governments across the globe. It is generally accepted that the United States has had five distinct party systems, each featuring two major parties that attract a consistent political coalition and follow a consistent party ideology, separated by four realignments. Two of the most apparent examples include the 1896 United States presidential election, when the issues of the American Civil War political system were replaced with those of the Populist and Progressive Era, and the 1932 United States presidential election, when the issues of the Populist and Progressive Eras were replaced by New Deal liberalism and modern conservatism. Realigning elections also contribute significantly to realigning (what comparative politics calls) party systems—for example, in 1828, separating the First Party System and the Second Party System in the US.

Political realignments can be sudden (1–4 years) or gradual (5–20 years). Most often, as demonstrated in V. O. Key Jr.'s (1955) original hypothesis, a single "critical election" marks a sudden realignment. However, he also argued that a cyclical process of realignment exists, in which political views within interest groups gradually separate, which he called secular realignment. Political scientists and historians often disagree about which elections are realignments and what defines a realignment, and even whether realignments occur. The terms themselves are somewhat arbitrary, and usage among political scientists and historians varies. In the US, Walter Dean Burnham argued for a 30–38 year "cycle" of realignments. Many of the elections often included in the Burnham 38-year cycle are considered "realigning" for different reasons.

Other political scientists and quantitative elections analysts reject realignment theory altogether, arguing that no long-term patterns exist. Political scientist David R. Mayhew states, "Elections and their underlying causes are not usefully sortable into generation-long spans ... It is too slippery, too binary, too apocalyptic, and it has come to be too much of a dead end." Sean Trende, senior elections analyst at RealClearPolitics, also argues against the realignment theory and the "emerging Democratic majority" thesis proposed by journalist John Judis and political scientist Ruy Teixeira. In his 2012 book The Lost Majority, Trende states, "Almost none of the theories propounded by realignment theorists has endured the test of time... It turns out that finding a 'realigning' election is a lot like finding an image of Jesus in a grilled-cheese sandwich – if you stare long enough and hard enough, you will eventually find what you are looking for." In August 2013, Trende observed that U.S. presidential election results from 1880 through 2012 show a 0.96 correlation with the expected outcomes (i.e. events) in the binomial distribution of a fair coin flip experiment. In May 2015, statistician and FiveThirtyEight editor-in-chief Nate Silver argued against a blue-wall Electoral College advantage for the Democratic Party in the 2016 U.S. presidential election. In post-election analysis, Silver cited Trende, noting that "there are few, if any, permanent majorities," and both Silver and Trende argued that the "emerging Democratic majority" thesis led most pre-election news coverage and commentary to overstate Hillary Clinton's chances of being elected.

== Realignment theory ==
The central holding of realignment theory, first developed in the political scientist V. O. Key Jr.'s 1955 article, "A Theory of Critical Elections", is that American elections, parties and policymaking routinely shift in swift, dramatic sweeps as well as slow, gradual movements.

V. O. Key Jr., E. E. Schattschneider, James L. Sundquist, Walter Dean Burnham are generally credited with developing and refining the theory of realignment. Though they differed on some of the details, earlier realignments scholars generally concluded that systematic patterns are identifiable in American national elections. Such that cycles occur on a regular schedule: once every 36-years or so. This period of roughly 30 years fits with the notion that these cycles are closely linked to generational change. However later scholars, such as Shafer and Reichley, argue that the patterns are longer, closer to 50 to 60 years in duration. Pointing to the Democratic dominance from 1800 to 1860, and Republican rule from 1860 to 1932 as examples, Reichley argues that the only true realigning elections occurred in these 60 year periods. Given the much longer length of time since the last generally accepted realignment in 1932, more recent scholars have theorized that realignments don't in fact operate on any consistent time scale, but rather occur whenever the necessary political, social, and economic changes occur.

=== Voter realignments ===
A central component of realignment is the change in behavior of voting groups. Realignment within the context of voting relates to the switching of voter preferences from one party to another. This is in contrast to dealignment where a voter group abandons a party due to voter apathy or to become independent. In the US and Australia, as the ideologies of the parties define many of the aspects of voters' lives and the decisions that they make, a realignment by a voter tends to have a longer-lasting effect.

In Britain, Canada, and other countries the phenomenon of political realignment is not as drastic. Due to the multi-party system, voters have a tendency to switch parties on a whim, perhaps only for one election, as there is far less loyalty towards one particular party.

== Cultural issues ==
The major political parties in the United States have held the same name for over a century, yet there is no doubt that their values and intentions have changed. While realignment is caused by various reasons, one of the largest factors is cultural issues. The culture of a population is altered over time as technology advances, needs change, and values evolve. With this shift, a population's views and desires will also change, thus resulting in parties realigning to be relevant to present topics.

In recent years, LGBTQ rights has become a growing factor in politics around the world. The increasing publicized presence of the LGBTQ community has created rifts and realignments in political parties. For example, in 2022, there were 315 bills introduced to various state legislatures across the United States that were found to be anti-LGBTQ. Of these 315 bills, 29 were signed into the state's law.

While further discussing evolving social issues and its relation to party realignment, the growing issue of abortion has been found in relevancy to newly found party values. These values which differentiate between certain parties can be attributed to federal abortion policies, which have been altered, fought for, and lost, thus creating a mass social issue. Since Roe v. Wade, abortion has largely become a major aspect of US politics. Furthermore, the 2022 Dobbs v. Jackson Women's Health Organization case has sparked further issues in the US political scene, as it overturned the constitutional right of abortion that was granted from Roe v. Wade, in 1973. The issue of abortion, state restrictions, and overturning of federal funding for procedures has created a political uproar in the US. For example, many state legislatures, members of Congress, and other politically powered members have created restrictions on insurance, funding, and the overall accessibility of having an abortion. These actions have created the movement of activists to fight for the right of abortion. Furthermore, this battle has caused political parties to acknowledge the cause, determine their stance, and realign overall.

== United States ==
=== Political realignment in United States history ===
- 1800 presidential election — Thomas Jefferson
  - This election completed the turnover of power in the First Party System from the Federalist Party, led by Alexander Hamilton, to Jefferson and his Democratic-Republican Party. The center of power shifted from New England to the South and Jeffersonian democracy became the dominant ideology.
  - Republicans gained 19.7% of House seats in 1800, 9.4% in 1802 and 9.7% in 1804, for a total gain of 38.8% in 3 elections.
  - As late as 1812, the Federalists came within one state of winning. A larger shift in electoral politics arguably came in the 1812–1816 period, as the Federalists became discredited after opposing the War of 1812.
- 1828 presidential election — Andrew Jackson
  - This election redefined the party system in the United States, setting up the Second Party System, which was dominated by Jacksonian democracy. The Democratic-Republicans split into two parties, later renamed as the Democratic Party and the Whig Party. The Democrats were led by Andrew Jackson of Tennessee and Martin Van Buren of New York. By 1834 the Whigs emerged as the opposition to Andrew Jackson, led by Henry Clay of Kentucky.
- 1860 presidential election — Abraham Lincoln
  - After the Whigs collapsed after 1852, party alignments were in turmoil, with several third parties, such as the Know Nothings and the Opposition Party. The system stabilized in 1858 and the presidential election marked the ascendence of the Republican Party. Abraham Lincoln beat out three other contenders — but even if they had somehow united he still had the majority of the electoral vote. The Republican party was pledged to the long-term ending of slavery, which was proximate cause of secession. Republicans rallied around nationalism in 1861 and fought the American Civil War to end secession. During the war the Republicans, under Lincoln's leadership, switched to a goal of short-term ending of slavery. By 1864, the Republicans had a coalition built around followers of the "free labor" ideology, as well as soldiers and veterans of the Union Army. (Since then, the military establishment has favored the Republicans.)
    - The Republican Party went from 18.3% of the House in 1854, to 38.0% in 1856, 48.7% in 1858, and 59.0% in 1860, for a total gain of 40.7% in 4 elections.
- 1896 presidential election — William McKinley
  - The status of this election is hotly disputed; some political scientists, such as Jerome Clubb, do not consider it a realigning election. Other political scientists and historians, such as Kleppner and Burnham consider this the ultimate realignment and emphasize that the rules of the game had changed, the leaders were new, voting alignments had changed, and a whole new set of issues came to dominance as the old Civil War-era issues faded away. Funding from office holders was replaced by outside fundraising from business in 1896 — a major shift in political history. Furthermore, McKinley's tactics in beating William Jennings Bryan (as developed by Mark Hanna) marked a sea change in the evolution of the modern campaign. McKinley raised a huge amount of money from business interests, outspending Bryan by 10 to 1. Bryan meanwhile invented the modern technique of campaigning heavily in closely contested states, the first candidate to do so. Bryan's message of populism and class conflict marked a new direction for the Democrats. McKinley's victory in 1896 and repeat in 1900 was a triumph for pluralism, as all sectors and groups shared in the new prosperity brought about by his policy of rapid industrial growth.
  - While Republicans lost House seats in 1896, this followed a massive two-election gain: from 25.9% in 1890 to 34.8% in 1892 and 71.1% in 1894, for a total 45.2% gain. Republicans lost 13.4% in 1896, but still held 57.7% of House seats.
  - In terms of correlations among counties, the election of 1896 is a realignment flop, but this is only a problem if realignment is considered to occur in single elections. Rather, if realignment is thought of as a generational or long-term political movement, then change will occur over several elections, even if there is one "critical" election defining the new alignment. So, as pointed out above, the 1896 realignment really began around 1892, and the 130 seat GOP gain in 1894, the all-record for a house election, meant there were almost no seats left to pick up in 1896. However, the presidential election in 1896 is usually considered the start of the new alignment since the national election allowed the nation to make a more conscious decision about the future of industrial policy by selecting McKinley over Bryan, making this the defining election in the realignment. The election of 1876 passes the numbers test much better compared to 1896 alone, and Mayhew (2004) argues it resulted in far more drastic changes in United States politics: Reconstruction came to a sudden halt, African-Americans in the South would soon be completely disenfranchised, and politicians began to focus on new issues (such as tariffs and civil service reform).
- 1932 presidential election — Franklin D. Roosevelt
  - Of all the realigning elections, this one musters the most agreement from political scientists and historians; it is the archetypal realigning election. FDR's admirers such as Arthur Schlesinger, Jr. have argued that New Deal policies, developed in response to the crash of 1929 and the miseries of the Great Depression under Herbert Hoover, represented an entirely new phenomenon in American politics. More critical historians such as Carl Degler and David Kennedy see a great deal of continuity with Hoover's energetic but unsuccessful economic policies. In many ways, Roosevelt's legacy still defines the Democratic Party; he forged an enduring New Deal Coalition of big city machines, the White South, intellectuals, labor unions, Catholics, Jews, and Westerners. In 1936, African-Americans were added to the coalition (African-Americans had previously been denied the vote or voted Republican). For instance, Pittsburgh, which was a Republican stronghold from the Civil War up to this point, suddenly became a Democratic stronghold, and has elected a Democratic mayor to office in every election since this time.
  - The Democrats went from controlling 37.7% of House seats in 1928 to 49.6% in 1930 and 71.9% in 1932, for a total gain of 34.2% in two elections.
  - In the Senate, the Democrats went from controlling 40.6% of seats in 1928 to 49% in 1930 and 61.5% in 1932, for a total gain of 20.9% in two elections.

=== Other possible political realignments ===
Some debate exists today as to what elections could be considered realigning elections after 1932. Although several candidates have been proposed, there is no widespread agreement:

- 1874 elections
  - The 1874 elections saw a resurgence of the Democratic Party. Discontent with the presidency of Ulysses S. Grant and the economic depression known at the time as the Panic of 1873, and the slow return of disillusioned Liberal Republicans from their 1872 third party ticket, all energized the Democrats. The Democrats had not controlled either chamber of Congress since before the War. The realignment meant the Democrats generally controlled the House of Representatives from 1875 to their massive defeat in 1894. Republicans eked out very narrow wins in most of the presidential elections in that period. The Civil Rights Act of 1875, enacted in the lame-duck session of Congress following the 1874 elections, was the last major Reconstruction law, and it was chiefly of symbolic value. The new strength of the Democrats marked the end of Reconstruction legislation. With the end of Reconstruction, the 11 former states of the Confederacy became a dominant-party system known as the Solid South. The tariff and especially monetary policy emerged as the great ideological debates after 1874.
- 1964 and 1968 presidential elections — Lyndon B. Johnson and Richard Nixon
  - The 1968 election is often cited due to the innovative campaign strategy of Nixon. In running against Hubert Humphrey, he used what became known as the Southern strategy. He appealed to white voters in the South with a call for "states' rights", which they interpreted as meaning that the federal government would no longer demand the forced busing of school children as ordered by federal courts. Democrats protested that Nixon exploited racial fears in winning the support of white southerners and northern white ethnics. Roosevelt's New Deal coalition had lasted over 30 years but after the urban riots and Vietnam crisis of the mid-1960s one by one the coalition partners peeled away until only a hollow core remained, setting the stage for a GOP revival. Nixon's downfall postponed the realignment which came about under Reagan, as even the term "liberalism" fell into disrepute.
  - Including this as a realignment preserves the roughly 30-year cyclical pattern: 1896 to 1932, 1932 to 1964, and 1964 to 1994.
  - For political scientists, 1964 was primarily an issue-based realignment. The classic study of the 1964 election, by Carmines and Stimson (1989), shows how the polarization of activists and elites on race-related issues sent clear signals to the general public about the historic change in each party's position on Civil Rights. Notably, while only 50% of African-Americans self-identified as Democrats in the 1960 National Election Study, 82% did in 1964, and the numbers are higher in the 21st century. The clearest indicator of the importance of this election was that Deep Southern states, such as Mississippi, voted Republican in 1964. In contrast, much of the traditional Republican strongholds of the Northeast and Upper Midwest voted Democratic. Vermont and Maine, which stood alone voting against FDR in 1936, voted for LBJ in 1964.
  - Many analysts do not consider 1968 a realigning election because control of Congress did not change; the Democrats would control the Senate until 1980 (and again from 1986 to 1994) and the House until 1994. Also missing was a marked change in the partisan orientation of the electorate. Importantly, these two elections are consistent with the theory in that the old New Deal issues were replaced by Civil Rights issues as the major factor explaining why citizens identified with each party. Other scholars contend that this is the beginning of a thirty-year dealignment, in which citizens generally moved towards political independence, which ended with the 1994 election.
- 1980 presidential election — Ronald Reagan
  - In this election, Ronald Reagan won a sweeping victory over Democrat Jimmy Carter, who won only six states (plus the District of Columbia), which accounted for just 10% of the electoral vote. Republicans also took control of the Senate for the first time in over 25 years. (See Reagan's coattails.)
  - The 1980 election can be seen as an ideological realignment, as it marked the beginning of the Reagan Era and marked a realignment towards conservatism and conservative policies. In addition, Reagan Democrats are a result of his presidency and campaigns. Many scholars viewed Reagan's policies as sufficiently new to consider this a realigning election.
  - On the other hand, critics like Mayhew (2004) note that control of the House did not change, nor even come close to changing, at this time. Republicans actually held fewer House seats in 1983 than they held in 1973. In addition, the Republicans lost the Senate again only six years later, leading some to conclude that the Senators simply rode in on Reagan's coattails, and did not represent a true shift in the ideological preferences of their constituents. Also absent was a shift in partisan alignment from public opinion polls. Both liberals, such as Nobel laureate Paul Krugman, and conservatives, such as Reagan communications director Pat Buchanan, would also argue that Nixon's victory in 1968 set the stage for Reagan's victory, and the fact that Reagan did so well in Southern states, traditionally a Democratic stronghold, as well as the fact that some of Reagan's rhetoric involving law and order and states' rights seemed to mirror Nixon's Southern Strategy seem to bear this fact out.
- 1992 presidential election — Bill Clinton
  - Clinton carried several states that had previously been Republican or swing states in both the Northeast and on the West Coast. Most notably, the largest state California switched from being a reliably Republican state to being consistently Democratic: it has been carried by Democratic candidates ever since. Other states that switched and have remained with the Democrats since include Connecticut, Delaware, Illinois, Maine, Maryland, New Jersey, and Vermont. In contrast, despite the fact Clinton came from the South, he only carried four of the former Confederate states: Arkansas (his home state), Louisiana, Tennessee (his vice president's home state) and Georgia, confirming it as a Republican base of support.
  - Since 1992, the Democratic candidate has won the national popular vote in every presidential election except 2004 and 2024, suggesting some manner of national realignment away from the Republican domination of the 1970s and 1980s. This national tendency toward Democratic presidential candidates did not necessarily translate to Democratic victories in congressional elections. However Republicans remained competitive nationally, making historic gains in the 1994 and 2010 midterms, although the composition of the electorate in presidential versus midterm elections vary significantly.
- 1994 House of Representatives and Senate elections
  - This election is now generally seen as a realigning election by political scientists. Republicans won majorities in both the House and the Senate, taking control of both chambers for the first time since 1954. In addition, control of the House continued until 2007. Newt Gingrich, who promoted a "Contract with America", successfully nationalized the campaign by coordinating races around the country. The overwhelming nature of the Republicans' victory points to a realignment; the party gained 54 seats, while neither party would gain more than a handful of seats in any election until 2006.
  - The GOP gained seats in 43 of 46 state houses. These gains continued into the next decade, so that by 2002 the GOP held the majority of state legislative seats for the first time in fifty years.
  - Notably, the period of party decline and mass dealignment appears to have ended in the 1990s. Strength of partisanship, as measured by the National Election Study, increased in the 1990s, as does the percentage of the mass public who perceive important differences between each party.
  - This election also indicates the rise of religious issues as one of the most important cleavage in American politics. While Reagan's election hinted at the importance of the religious right, it was the formation of the Christian Coalition (the successor to the Moral Majority) in the early 1990s that gave Republicans organizational and financial muscle, particularly at the state level. By 2004 the media portrayed the political nation as divided into "red" (Republican) and "blue" (Democratic) states, with reputed differences in cultural attitudes and politics between the two blocs.
  - The Republicans made historic inroads in the Solid South where they picked up total of 19 House seats. Going into the election, House Democrats outnumbered House Republicans. Afterwards, the Republicans outnumbered Democrats for the first time since Reconstruction.
- 2008 presidential election — Barack Obama
  - In the 2008 elections, the Democrats expanded their majorities in the Congress, and won the presidency decisively. This was due to the momentum carried over from the Democrats' 2006 successes, as well as the continued unpopularity of President George W. Bush, whose administration was now faced with a financial crisis and economic recession. Some people believe that 2008 is possibly a realigning election with a long-lasting impact, just as the election of Franklin D. Roosevelt was in 1932 and the election of Ronald Reagan in 1980 were. Most notably, Virginia switched from being a reliably Republican state to being consistently Democratic: it has been carried by Democratic candidates ever since. Colorado also switched and has remained with the Democrats since. President Obama was reelected in the 2012 election as well, becoming only the third Democrat to win an absolute majority of the popular vote more than once while losing only two entire states that he had won in 2008.
  - On the other hand, the Republican Party experienced major gains two years later in 2010, retaking the House with a gain of 63 seats, the largest Republican gain in 72 years. Additionally, the Republican Party gained six seats in the Senate, slimming the Democratic majority. Despite Obama's reelection in 2012, the Republicans had another strong performance in the 2014 midterms; they not only increased their majority in the House and recaptured the Senate, but also made gains in the gubernatorial races and other statewide and local races, resulting in 31 Republican governorships and 68 state legislative houses under Republican control, thus increasing their influence to the largest Republican majority in the entire country in nearly a century.
- 2016 presidential election — Donald Trump
  - In this election, Donald Trump, the Republican candidate, won Wisconsin, Michigan, and Pennsylvania, all Midwestern and/or Rust Belt states that some had previously considered safely Democratic, though those states were close in several prior elections. Trump also came close to winning New Hampshire, Minnesota, and Maine.
  - However, like with Obama in the 2008 election, two years later in the 2018 United States elections, the Republican Party lost control of the House with a loss of 40 seats, but gained two seats in the Senate, so the full effect of the 2016 election and the Trump first presidency as a critical election remains to be seen.
  - Furthermore, Trump lost to Obama's former vice president and Democratic nominee Joe Biden in the 2020 United States presidential election. In particular, Trump lost the three states of Michigan, Pennsylvania, and Wisconsin that were cited as key to his victory in 2016, although by relatively narrow margins compared to the Obama era. Additionally, the Republican Party also lost control of the Senate with a loss of three seats and Vice President Kamala Harris's tie-breaking vote gave Democrats control of the chamber.
  - In the 2022 United States elections, the Republican Party narrowly retaking the House with a gain of nine seats.
  - In the 2024 United States presidential election, Trump managed to make a return to the presidency with the same coalition as 2016, however he was able to come within single digits of the Hispanic vote, allowing for Nevada to be flipped and larger margins in Texas and Florida. Additionally, the Republican Party also recaptured the Senate with a gain of four seats.

== Canada ==
The history of the critical realigning elections in Canada, both nationally and in the provinces, is covered by Argyle (2011).

=== Federal ===
According to recent scholarship, there have been four party systems in Canada at the federal level since Confederation, each with its own distinctive pattern of social support, patronage relationships, leadership styles, and electoral strategies. Steve Patten identifies four party systems in Canada's political history

- The first party system emerged from pre-Confederation colonial politics, had its "heyday" from 1896 to 1911 and lasted until the Conscription Crisis of 1917, and was characterized by local patronage administered by the two largest parties, the Liberals and the Conservatives.
- The second system emerged following the First World War, and had its heyday from 1935 to 1957, was characterized by regionalism and saw the emergence of several protest parties, such as the Progressives, the Social Credit Party, and the Co-operative Commonwealth Federation.
- The third system emerged in 1963 and had its heyday from 1968 to 1983 and began to unravel thereafter. The two largest parties were challenged by a strong third party, the New Democratic Party. Campaigns during this era became more national in scope due to electronic media, and involved a greater focus on leadership. The dominant policy of the era was Keynesian economics.
- The fourth party system has involved the rise of the Reform Party, the Bloc Québécois, and the merger of the Canadian Alliance with the Progressive Conservatives. It saw most parties move to one-member-one-vote leadership contests, and a major reform to campaign finance laws in 2004. The fourth party system has been characterized by market-oriented policies that abandoned Keynesian policies, but maintained the welfare state.

Stephen Clarkson (2005) shows how the Liberal Party has dominated all the party systems, using different approaches. It began with a "clientelistic approach" under Laurier, which evolved into a "brokerage" system of the 1920s, 1930s and 1940s under Mackenzie King. The 1950s saw the emergence of a "pan-Canadian system", which lasted until the 1990s. The 1993 election — categorized by Clarkson as an electoral "earthquake" which "fragmented" the party system, saw the emergence of regional politics within a four party-system, whereby various groups championed regional issues and concerns. Clarkson concludes that the inherent bias built into the first-past-the-post system, has chiefly benefited the Liberals.

- 1896 election
  - 1896 saw a Liberal victory under Sir Wilfrid Laurier. From the 1867 election until 1896, the Conservative Party of John A. Macdonald had governed Canada, excepting a single term from 1873 to 1878. The Liberals had struggled to retake office, under Laurier and his predecessor, Edward Blake. 1896 was the first election held after the death of Macdonald in 1891, and the Conservatives had been in complete disarray in the ensuing years, with no fewer than four leaders. The Liberals would remain in office until 1911. Beyond that, political scientists often consider this election that made the Liberal Party the dominant force in Canadian politics, holding office for more than two thirds of the time between 1896 and 2006.
- 1993 election
  - 1993 saw not only the sweeping success of the Liberals under Jean Chrétien, but also the collapse of the Progressive Conservatives as their support base switched to regional parties in Quebec and the western provinces, resulting in a five party political system with the Liberals as the dominant party. During his second term, the PCs' policies were unpopular, while the failure of the Meech Lake and Charlottetown Accords frustrated Quebec and stirred up Western alienation. New regional parties which formed in protest: the Bloc Québécois in Quebec and the Reform Party in the west. Meanwhile, the New Democratic Party, the longtime third party in parliament, fell from 43 seats to nine, as their endorsement of the Charlottetown Accord and Quebec nationalism cost them support among organized labour and rural voters in the west, which switched their support to Reform. Meanwhile, the Progressive Conservatives were nearly wiped out, falling from 156 seats to only two—the worst defeat of a sitting government at the federal level.
  - The Liberals under Chrétien would win a further two consecutive majorities in 1997 and 2000, while never being seriously challenged as the largest party. The Progressive Conservatives never recovered, ultimately merging with the Reform Party's successor, the Canadian Alliance, to form the new Conservative Party of Canada in late 2003.
  - The Bloc Québécois would remain a major presence in federal politics, with the party winning either the most or second-most seats in the province in every election since (with the exception of 2011 and 2015).
- 2004 election
  - While Paul Martin's Liberals retained enough seats to continue as the government, it saw the re-emergence of a united Conservative Party, resulting in a four party system. This was also the first of three elections where no party managed a majority of seats.

=== Alberta ===
Alberta has had a tradition of one-party dominance, where a party forms government for an extended period before losing power. From 1905 to 2015, Alberta only changed governments (often called "dynasties") four times, with no party ever returning to government. The elections of 1921, 1935, 1971 and 2015 each marked the end of a particular dynasty and a realignment of the province's party system.

The 2019 election has also been suggested as a realignment: although the New Democratic Party was defeated after only one term, they retained a strong base of seats and remained competitive in opinion polling and fundraising, pointing to a possible development of a competitive two-party system against the United Conservative Party.

=== British Columbia ===
- 1991 British Columbia general election – End of Social Credit as an effective political force in British Columbia politics. The Socreds under Premier Rita Johnston was reduced to third party status, while the New Democratic Party of Mike Harcourt formed the government. Liberal Party leader Gordon Wilson surprised observers by leading his party to winning one-third of the votes cast. This was enough to not only return them to the legislature, but make them the official opposition.
- 2001 British Columbia general election - The centre-right coalesced around the BC Liberal Party, which won 77 of 79 seats and 57.6% of the popular vote. This essentially rebuilt much of the Socred coalition around the BC Liberal Party. At the same time, the NDP faced significant unpopularity after several scandals (such as the Fast Ferry Scandal), and failed to break the Liberal majority until 2017.
- 2024 British Columbia general election - The centre-right rallied around the Conservative Party of BC, which won 44 of 93 seats and 43.28% of the popular vote. The first time the party won seats in almost 50 years and it best electoral performance in 72 years. The election saw the once dominant BC United (formerly the BC Liberals), who served as the official opposition, withdraw from the race before the election to avoid splitting the vote.

=== Quebec ===
A considerable number of Quebec general elections have been known characterized by high seat turnovers, with certain ones being considered realigning elections, notably:

- The 1936 election which ended 39 years of Liberal rule (16 of them recently under Louis-Alexandre Taschereau); and saw the rise of Maurice Duplessis's Union Nationale, which would go on to form government for all but one term until 1960.
- The 1960 election, which not only ended 15 continuous years of Union Nationale rule and precipitated its gradual decline, but ushered in the Quiet Revolution under Jean Lesage.
- The 1976 election, which saw René Lévesque's Parti Québécois not only make a breakthrough in the National Assembly. It also made sovereignty the dominant political issue from then on, with parties subsequently aligning themselves on a sovereignty–federalist spectrum.
- The 2018 election suggested the end of the sovereignty-federalist split due to the emergence of the Coalition Avenir Québec, which campaigned on a nationalist platform while explicitly ruling out sovereignty.

Since the 1990s, provincial elections in Quebec show increasing voter realignment and volatility in party support. The Quebec Liberal Party (unaffiliated with the federal Liberals since 1955) been a major party since Confederation, but they have faced different opposition parties.

== Outside of North America ==
=== Asia ===
- 1977 Indian general election - Janata Party victory, defeating the Indian National Congress
  - The left-wing Indian National Congress, which had won every general election since the first post-independence election in 1952, lost power to the Janata Party led by Morarji Desai, after the immensely unpopular imposition of The Emergency by Prime Minister Indira Gandhi in 1975. Both Indira Gandhi and her son Sanjay lost their seats.
- 2014 Indian general election - Bharatiya Janata Party victory, defeating the Indian National Congress
  - The Congress party suffered a major decline on both the national and state level, with the BJP occupying the dominant position Congress used to have since. Congress was defeated by the BJP again in the 2019 and 2024 elections. Until 2019, Congress had never been out of power for two consecutive terms.
- 1977 Israeli legislative election
  - Likud defeated the Alignment, led by the Israel Labor Party, allowing Likud to lead a government for the first time ever. For the first 29 years of Israel's independence, politics had been dominated by the left-wing parties Labor and its predecessor, Mapai. The leadership of the right, especially Menachem Begin, were considered by the Left to be beyond the pale, and as Ben Gurion had said in the early years of the State, he would enter coalitions with any parties, except the communists and Begin. Prior to this election a hypothetical bloc of right-wing and religious parties would rarely ever approach the threshold of a majority government; however since 1977, a combination of these two blocs have made up the majority of Israel's electorate since then with exceptions of a few elections but no longer running far behind in comparison to pre-1977. Due to corruption in the Labor Party, many former Labor voters defected to the new Democratic Movement for Change, which won 15 seats and finished in third place, behind the Likud with 46 seats and Alignment (Labor plus Mapam) with 32 seats. The DMC collapsed within three years, allowing Labor to rebound at the next election. Labor and Likud dominated Israeli politics until 2003 when Labor went into sudden decline due to a backlash against the failed Oslo Accords and the outbreak of the Second Intifada.
- 2000 Taiwanese presidential election — Chen Shui-bian
  - Though more popular and consistently ranked higher in the polls, James Soong failed to gain the ruling Kuomintang's (KMT) nomination over incumbent Vice President Lien Chan. As a result, he announced his candidacy as an independent candidate, and was consequently expelled from the party. The split in the KMT vote resulted in a victory for Chen Shui-bian of the Democratic Progressive Party, even though he won only 39% of the popular vote. After the election, Soong founded the People First Party, which attracted members from the KMT and the pro-unification New Party, which was by that time beginning to fade. Angry from the defeat, the KMT expelled chairman Lee Teng-hui, who was president until 2000 and was widely suspected of causing the KMT split so that Chen would win. Lee then founded the pro-independence Taiwan Solidarity Union. The impact of these events changed the political landscape of Taiwan. Not only did the KMT lose the presidency for the first time in half a century, but its policies swung away from Lee's influence and it began intra-party reform. The two newly founded parties became far more viable than other minor parties in the past, and the multi-party nature of Taiwan's politics was confirmed by the legislative elections of 2001. The KMT would not return to power until 2008 under the leadership of Ma Ying-jeou.
- 2002 Turkish general election — Justice and Development Party victory
  - This election was notable in that every party in the previous Grand National Assembly of Turkey was ejected from Parliament, as none of them crossed the 10% threshold. This not only included the governing coalition of the Democratic Left Party, Motherland Party and Nationalist Movement Party, but the largest opposition party, the True Path Party. The AKP, which formed the government following this election, has dominated Turkish politics ever since.
- 2006 Palestinian legislative election (Palestinian National Authority) — Hamas victory; Ismail Haniyeh Prime Minister
  - In January 2006 the militant Hamas organisation, classified as a terrorist group by the United States government and other groups, won a landslide victory over the ruling Fatah party which had been in power under the leadership of former PLO chairman Yasser Arafat. The Bush Administration, the Quartet, and Israel all threatened to cut off foreign aid to the Palestinian Authority if Hamas refused to abandon terrorist tactics and recognise the right of the State of Israel to exist. This concession, though discussed in Hamas circles, did not come about soon enough to prevent a serious breakdown in services under Hamas government, and Western (especially American) support of Fatah paramilitaries eventually led to the breakout of the Fatah–Hamas conflict (termed a "Palestinian Civil War" by some) in December 2006. The Hamas government was suspended by PA President Mahmoud Abbas, a member of Fatah, after some weeks of fighting, and installed a caretaker government under the leadership of Salam Fayyad.

=== Europe ===
==== United Kingdom ====
- 1918 United Kingdom general election in Ireland — Sinn Féin victory
  - For the previous four decades, Irish politics had been dominated by the moderate nationalist Irish Parliamentary Party, which sought Home Rule within the United Kingdom. The 1918 general election was a landslide victory for the republican Sinn Féin party, which won nearly 70% of the seats. The new Sinn Féin MPs refused to take their seats in the House of Commons, and instead set up their own republican assembly called Dáil Éireann. This assembly issued a unilateral declaration of independence, which led to the start of the War of Independence and eventually led to Irish independence from the United Kingdom in 1922. The Irish Parliamentary Party never recovered from this defeat. The two largest parties in Ireland, Fianna Fáil and Fine Gael, originated from splits in the Sinn Féin party which won the election of 1918.
- 1922 United Kingdom general election – Labour Party forms Loyal Opposition
  - For over 200 years, the Liberals and Conservatives (and their antecedents) had been the UK's two major parties; however, the 1922 general election saw Labour overtake the Liberals in the political landscape. Labour and the Conservatives have been the UK's two major parties since then, and government has alternated only between the two parties ever since.
- 1979 United Kingdom general election – Conservative victory; Margaret Thatcher Prime Minister
  - This election brought the Conservatives into government where they remained for eighteen uninterrupted years. Thatcher's policies of monetarism and privatisation represented a very different strand of Conservatism to that of previous governments and a bold shift from the post-war consensus that had existed since 1945. The shockwaves led to a new centrist party being formed by some disenchanted Labour MPs (the SDP) in 1981, and a long period in opposition for Labour, during which they abandoned many socialist policies (notably Clause IV which advocated common ownership) and were transformed into "New Labour" before they returned to government in a landslide victory at the 1997 general election under the leadership of Tony Blair. At a more base level, it led to a shift in voting patterns as the traditional class-based voting started to break down and many of the working classes (in particular skilled workers, homeowners and those in southern England) voted Conservative, whilst at the same time many public sector professionals shifted their support to Labour.
- 2015 United Kingdom general election
  - The election saw Euroscepticism and Scottish Nationalism emerge as major forces in the UK political discourse, with the UK Independence Party and Scottish National Party finishing third in the popular vote and seat count respectively, and the Liberal Democrats, the country's traditional third-party, losing 49 of the 57 seats it had won at the previous general election. The SNP's victories, largely at the expense of the Scottish Labour and Liberal Democrat parties, established them as the dominant party in Scotland's electoral politics, a position they have since maintained. UKIP did not continue to enjoy electoral success (in part because they only won a single seat despite finishing third in the popular vote) and rapidly declined thereafter, but many of their policies were subsequently adopted by the Conservative Party, who formed a majority government for the first time since 1992.
- 2019 United Kingdom general election – Conservative victory; Boris Johnson Prime Minister
  - The Conservative Party won a landslide victory over the Labour Party, winning many seats in the red wall, including seats that have never voted Conservative for over a century. This was repeated again in 2021 local elections for mayoral and council elections, where the Conservatives made large gains in red wall areas but Labour (along with the Liberal Democrats and the Green Party) made gains in the south of England, with more educated voters.

==== Ireland ====
- 1932 Irish general election – Fianna Fáil victory; Éamon de Valera President of the Executive Council
  - This election resulted in Fianna Fáil, led by Éamon de Valera, becoming the largest party in Dáil Éireann for the first time. Fianna Fáil remained in power for the next sixteen years and remained the largest party in the Dáil for the next 79 years, serving as the government more than 58 of those years.
- 2011 Irish general election
  - Fianna Fáil, who had governed Ireland for most of the post-independence era, were heavily defeated at the election following anger over the Irish financial crisis. For the first time, Fine Gael overtook Fianna Fáil to win the most votes and seats, while Fianna Fáil fell from first place to third place, in terms of both votes and seats. Fine Gael and the second largest party in the Dáil, the Labour Party formed a coalition government.
- 2020 Irish general election
  - This election resulted in the three largest parties each winning a share of the vote between 20% and 25%, along with the best result for Sinn Féin since 1923 (37 of the 160 seats) (before the formation of Fianna Fáil). Along with the two dominant parties Fine Gael and Fianna Fáil not having enough seats between them (38 and 35 respectively) to have a majority (at least 80 seats needed out of 160 seats), this election resulted in a break from a two-party dominant legislature, with something closer to a three party result.

==== Denmark ====
- 1973 Danish general election – Poul Hartling Prime Minister
  - The 1973 Danish general election is referred to as the Landslide Election (Danish: Jordskredsvalget), as five new or previously unrepresented parties won seats, and more than half the members of the parliament were replaced. The Social Democratic Party, which had led a minority government until this election, lost one-third of their seats. After the election, Poul Hartling, the leader of the liberal Venstre, formed the smallest minority government in Danish history with only 22 seats, supported by the Progress Party, the Conservative People's Party, the Social Liberal Party, the Centre Democrats and the Christian People's Party.

==== Spain ====
- 1982 Spanish general election – Spanish Socialist Workers' Party (PSOE) victory
  - This election saw the ruling Union of the Democratic Centre (UCD), the party that had shepherded the country through its transition to democracy, nearly wiped out. The UCD fell to only 11 seats, being replaced as the main non-socialist party by the People's Alliance (AP), and would dissolve itself as a party shortly after the election. The PSOE and AP – later transformed into the People's Party (PP) – would go on to dominate Spanish politics for the next three decades. At the same time, the PSOE would establish itself as the dominant party of Spanish politics until the 1996 general election.

==== Italy ====
- 1994 Italian general election – Forza Italia/Pole of Freedoms victory
  - This election resulted in the near-destruction of the Italian People's Party (the renamed Christian Democracy), which had been the largest party in the country since 1946. The Italian Socialist Party, a major coalition partner for the last thirty years, was decimated as well. The other parties of the Pentapartito fell into obscurity.

==== Germany ====
- 1998 German federal election – first federal level red-green coalition victory
  - The election resulted in the first left of center majority in Germany on the federal level ever. The SPD came in first place for the first time since 1972 and the second time overall since the war. The election unseated Helmut Kohl after 16 years in office and having presided over German reunification and with five factions achieving more than the five percent electoral threshold of votes, it gave a first indication of the more fractious political landscape of the Berlin Republic. The FDP was removed from government after 29 consecutive years.

==== Lithuania ====
- 2000 Lithuanian parliamentary election
  - In these elections both electoral blocs (one led by the Communist Party of Lithuania/Democratic Labour Party of Lithuania and another led by the Sąjūdis/Homeland Union), which dominated political landscape since 1990, lost out to the populist New Union and the liberal Liberal Union of Lithuania parties. Those parties (and their successors, the Labour Party, Liberal Democratic Party, Liberal and Centre Union, Liberal Movement) would become vital players to coalitions' after that. Since then Lithuania saw the rise of many short-lived populist parties.

==== Poland ====
- 2005 Polish parliamentary election
  - The elections resulted in a widely expected heavy defeat for the post-Communist Democratic Left Alliance government, with conservative parties such as Law and Justice and Civic Platform emerging as the dominant parties (and coalitions led by them) in Poland.

==== Estonia ====
- 2007 Estonian parliamentary election
  - The elections resulted the Estonian Reform Party becoming the largest party on national level, the position which is retained ever since.

==== Hungary ====
- 2010 Hungarian parliamentary election
  - The election resulted the landslide victory of the Fidesz, gaining a two-thirds majority in parliament, while long-time rival, the Hungarian Socialist Party (MSZP) had drastically weakened, ending the de facto two-party system that existed since 1998. Two major parties of the "regime change", the MDF and the SZDSZ, lost their all parliamentary seats. Two new parties, Jobbik and LMP, emerged. After 2010, under the Fidesz government led by Viktor Orbán, Hungary was reclassified by Freedom House from a democracy to a transitional or hybrid regime.
- 2026 Hungarian parliamentary election
  - The election resulted the landslide victory of the newly established Tisza over Fidesz, gaining a two-thirds majority in parliament and ending the 16-year Orbán era. Most of the other parties pulled out of the campaign in order to prevent Fidesz from taking advantage of vote-splitting. Among the parties who bowed out was the Hungarian Socialist Party, which thus had no seats in parliament for the first time since the end of communism. This was the first time in 106 years that no left-wing parties secured any parliamentary mandates.

==== Greece ====
- May 2012 Greek legislative election
  - Greece's two main political parties since the restoration of democracy in 1974, New Democracy and the Panhellenic Socialist Movement (PASOK), saw a combined fall in support from nearly 80% in 2009 to just one-third for their role in supporting austerity measures to alleviate the Greek government-debt crisis. At this election, PASOK fell dramatically from first place to third place. This election also saw the shift of left-leaning support to the Eurosceptic Coalition of the Radical Left (SYRIZA) which has been at the forefront of opposition to the austerity measures and to the neoliberal economic policies of the European Union.

==== France ====
- 2017 French presidential election
  - Neither the mainstream left Socialist Party nor the mainstream right Republicans made the second round of voting, the first time since the Second World War that both of the formerly dominant strands of French politics have not been represented. Instead, the two leading candidates – the eventual winner, centrist liberal pro-European Emmanuel Macron of En Marche and far-right Eurosceptic Marine Le Pen of the National Front – were identified by many analysts as representing a new open–closed political spectrum between conservative protectionism and liberal globalism. A similar realignment happened in the concurrent 2017 legislative election.

==== Czech Republic ====
- 2017 Czech parliamentary election
  - Populist ANO saw massive gains at the expense of the traditional left-wing parties ČSSD and KSČM, replacing the former as the main rival to the Civic Democratic Party (ODS) which had suffered massive loses in the election before. The election also saw the rise of the Czech Pirate Party and the right-wing populist Freedom and Direct Democracy, both outperformed most traditional parties but ODS.

==== Slovakia ====
2014 (left) with Andrej Kiska winning 80% in the south; 2024 (right) with Pellegrini winning the south
- 2024 Slovak presidential election
  - The Hungarian-majority communities in the South had been stronghold for the liberal-leaning candidates, who ran against the candidates endorsed by the nationalist HZDS, Smer and SNS parties, up to that election. In the run-off, the majority of the Hungarians supported Peter Pellegrini who was supported by Smer over Ivan Korčok who was backed by most liberal parties and by sitting president Zuzana Čaputová who won the Hungarian vote herself in 2019. Pellegrini was also the first nationalist-backed candidate to win since 2009.

=== Latin America ===
==== Colombia ====
- 1930 Colombian presidential election - Enrique Olaya Herrera President
  - After a 44-year domination in national politics by the Conservative Party (since 1886), the division of the conservative ticket (along with the economic crisis and the Banana Massacre) caused the first victory of the Liberal Party in half a century. This was the start of the period known as "Liberal Republic", in which the liberals kept the presidency for 16 years. Furthermore, this also started a winning-strike in legislative elections that would last until 2006, with the liberals winning in all elections they participated in with either a majority or plurality, being the first force in Congress in 68 out of 75 years.

==== Venezuela ====
- 1998 Venezuelan presidential election — Hugo Chávez Frías President
  - The result meant the end of the Puntofijismo that had dominated the political atmosphere of the country in the last 40 years and the beginning of the dominance of the new MVR party, later reformed as the PSUV.

==== Brazil ====
- 2002 Brazilian general election — Luiz Inácio Lula da Silva President
  - According to political theorist and former spokesman of the Brazilian Presidency (2003–2007) André Singer, the rise to power of the Worker's Party (PT) and the subsequent creation and expansion of income redistribution policies (Bolsa Família, minimum wage increases, etc.) has realigned the Brazilian political scene. Even in the event of an PT's electoral defeat, it is argued, no president would risk reverting Lula's programs, for fear of the reaction of the lower classes. Lula's victory in 2002 marked the beginning of the first left-wing government since 1964.
- 2018 Brazilian general election — Jair Bolsonaro was elected president, ending 13 years of Workers Party rule. Anger over the previous administration's failure to tackle widespread corruption and other crises engulfing Brazil handed the conservative politician victory.

=== Oceania ===
==== Australia ====
- 1910 Australian federal election — Labor victory; Andrew Fisher Prime Minister
  - The unification of the Protectionist Party and the Anti-Socialist Party (originally the Free Trade Party) into the Commonwealth Liberal Party earlier in 1909 made this election the first under what would become a two-party system, between the democratic socialist Labor Party versus a non-Labor, conservative party as the nation's two main parties. It also marked the first elected majority government federally.
- 1922 Australian federal election — Nationalist-Country coalition victory
  - This was the first time a conservative party formed the Coalition with the Country Party which represented graziers, farmers, and regional voters in the aftermath of the 1922 election. Despite some interruptions in Coalition agreements such as in 1931, 1939 and 1987, this coalition has existed until today, now between the Liberal Party (successor to the Nationalists) and National party (which was renamed from the Country party). The Liberal/National coalition alternates in power with their main opponents, the Australian Labor Party to form the federal government of Australia at every federal election.
- 1949 Australian federal election — Liberal victory; Robert Menzies Prime Minister
  - Previously, the United Australia Party (UAP) was seen as close to big business and the upper class, while their opponents, the Australian Labor Party appealed to trade unionists, and working and lower classes. By founding the Liberal Party to replace the UAP after its 1943 election defeat, Menzies began selling his party's appeal to middle-classes which he famously called "The Forgotten People" in the class conflict between the upper and lower social classes. Forming a coalition with the Country Party (now the National Party which represented rural graziers and farmers), this resulted in a coalition of liberals, conservatives and rural interests against the democratic socialists of the Australian Labor Party. Menzies kept free-traders and economic moderates; hard-line conservatives and social liberals united under one party, the Liberal party, by focusing on Labor's "socialism" and the international threat of communism amidst the Cold War.
  - During his 17 years in power from 1949 to 1966, the Menzies government presided over the longest period of economic prosperity in Australia's history, lasting from the late 1940s to the early 1970s. Continued economic growth, rising standards of living, and his widening of government support for education and universities led to the vast expansion of the Australian middle class and changed the Australian workforce from manual labour towards service, science and new technology industries; the ANZUS Treaty of 1951 and voting rights for Aboriginal Australians are legacies which still stand today. Arguably, Labor was forced to modernise and adopt a more social democratic approach (away from democratic socialism and nationalisation of industry) to appeal to the expanded middle class, under Gough Whitlam.
- 1972 Australian federal election – Labor victory; Gough Whitlam Prime Minister
  - After twenty-three years of Liberal rule under Menzies, Harold Holt, John Gorton and William McMahon, the Labor Party took power in 1972, with the slogan, 'It's Time'. The significance of this election was broader than merely a change of partisan rule; elections would be no longer decided only on economic issues, but also, new issues such as the environment, Aboriginal affairs, abortion, multiculturalism, and a broader acceptance of state spending, resulted from the Whitlam government, which in many respects created a bipartisan consensus on major issues of social policy. Although the Whitlam government was relatively brief, its policy legacy—in creating new government policies for society and culture—lasted in many respects to the 1996 election, and even to the present day.

==== New Zealand ====
- 1890 New Zealand general election – Liberal victory; John Ballance Prime Minister
  - The coming to power of the Liberal Party is heralded as a major milestone in New Zealand history. It marked the beginning of proper party politics in New Zealand. While groupings of 'Liberal' and 'Conservative' politicians date back to the 1870s they were more akin to loose factions rather than properly organised parties. Massive economic and social reforms took place following 1890 with a progressive land tax partnered with leasehold sponsorship to stimulate agriculture which recovered the country from the Long Depression. Ballance's successor Richard Seddon carried on reforms concentrating largely on establishing welfare. Arguably the Liberal's most famous and important achievement was the enfranchisement of women, a major social upheaval which saw New Zealand become the first country in the world to allow women to vote.
- 1935 New Zealand general election – Labour victory; Michael Joseph Savage Prime Minister
  - The 1935 election brought Labour to power for the first time. Huge economic change resulted from their entry into office at the height of the Great Depression which was to remain in place for half a century. A generous welfare system labeled as "social security" was instigated and the country's existing free market economy was completely abandoned in favour of a Keynesian based system with higher tariffs, guaranteed prices for producers and emphasis on local manufacturing to create jobs. The government was praised for their policies resulting in another landslide victory in 1938. The political landscape was also to change. The three-party era of the early 20th century ended with the United and Reform parties (who had formed a coalition between 1931 and 1935) completely merging a year later into the new National Party, who remain Labour's main rival to the present day, both occupying either government or opposition ever since.
- 1984 New Zealand general election – Labour victory; David Lange Prime Minister
  - The election of the Labour Government under the leadership of David Lange and Roger Douglas, brought about radical economic reform, moving New Zealand from what had probably been one of the most protected, regulated and state-dominated system of any capitalist democracy to an extreme position at the open, competitive, free-market end of the spectrum. Social policies also took a dramatic change with New Zealand's largely socially conservative outlook being reshaped with more liberal outlooks in the Lange government's policy epitomised by policies such as the passing of anti-nuclear legislation and the legalisation of homosexuality. Foreign relations also changed dramatically with New Zealand abandoning their allegiances with the United States, largely over the issue of anti-nuclear policy, culminating in their exclusion from ANZUS by both the US and Australia. New Zealand Party won 12% of the vote in their first election, it was the first time since 1935 that any party other than Labour, the National and Social Credit Party won more than 10% of the vote.
- 1996 New Zealand general election – National–New Zealand First coalition victory; Jim Bolger Prime Minister
  - The 1996 election was the first held under the new mixed-member proportional (MMP) voting system, introduced after two referendums in 1992 and 1993, and signalled the transition from the two-party era to a new multi-party era.

== See also ==
- American election campaigns in the 19th century
- Cyclical theory
- Electoral competition
- Flip-flop
- Landslide victory
- First Party System
- Second Party System
- Third Party System
- Fourth Party System
- Fifth Party System
- Sixth Party System
- Seventh Party System
- Swing state
- Wave election

== Notes and references ==
Bundled references
