= Cyclical theory =

Theory of political fluctuations in US history

Cyclical theories of history are intended to explain the numerous recurring events and patterns in humanity's recorded history. Several such cycles and recurring events have been described for the United States, cycles in both domestic affairs and in foreign policy, cycles with varying amounts of support.

== United States cycles ==
These are cycles first identified in the United States or are specific to United States politics.

=== Schlesingers' liberal–conservative cycle ===
Historians Arthur M. Schlesinger Sr., Arthur M. Schlesinger Jr. and others have proposed that the United States has an alternation of national moods and tendencies between liberalism and conservatism. Each phase has characteristic features, and each phase is self-limiting, eventually generating the other phase. This alternation has repeated itself several times over the history of the United States.

Schlesinger phases of American history
From	To	Duration (in years)	Type	Name
1776	1788	12	Lib	Liberal Movement to Create Constitution (Revolution, Confederation Period)
1788	1800	12	Con	Hamiltonian Federalism (Federalist Era)
1800	1812	12	Lib	Liberal Period of Jeffersonianism (Jeffersonian democracy)
1812	1829	17	Con	Conservative Retreat (War of 1812, Era of Good Feelings)
1829	1841	12	Lib	Jacksonian Democracy
1841	1861	20	Con	Domination of National Government by Slaveowners (Origins of the Civil War)
1861	1869	8	Lib	Abolition of Slavery and Reconstruction (Civil War, Reconstruction Era)
1869	1901	32	Con	Gilded Age
1901	1919	18	Lib	Progressive Era, World War I
1919	1931	12	Con	Republican Restoration (Roaring Twenties)
1931	1947	16	Lib	New Deal (Great Depression, World War II)
1947	1962	15	Con	Postwar Era
1962	1978	16	Lib	Civil-Rights Era
1978	?	?	Con	Reagan Era, Trump Era

Types:

- Lib: Liberal
- Con: Conservative

The Schlesingers' periodization closely parallels other periodizations of United States history. The features of each phase in the cycle can be summarized with a table.

Liberal	Conservative
Wrongs of the Many	Rights of the Few
Increase Democracy	Contain Democracy
Public Purpose	Private Interest
Human Rights	Property Rights

The Schlesingers proposed that their cycles are "self-generating", meaning that each kind of phase generates the other kind of phase. This process then repeats, causing cycles. Arthur Schlesinger Jr. speculated on possible reasons for these transitions. He speculated that since liberal phases involve bursts of reform effort, such bursts can be exhausting, and the body politic thus needs the rest of a conservative phase. He also speculated that conservative phases accumulate unsolved social problems, problems that require the efforts of a liberal phase to solve them. He additionally speculated on generational effects, since most of the liberal–conservative phase pairs are roughly 30 years long, roughly the length of a human generation. The Schlesingers' identified phases end in a conservative period. In a foreword written in 1999, Schlesinger Jr. speculated about why it has lasted unusually long, instead of ending in the early 1990s, from how long previous conservative periods typically lasted. One of his speculations was the continuing Computer Revolution, as disruptive as the earlier Industrial Revolution had been. Another of them was wanting a long rest after major national traumas. The 1860s Civil War and Reconstruction preceded the unusually-long Gilded Age, and the strife of the 1960s likewise preceded the recent unusually-long conservative period.

An alternative identification is due to Andrew S. McFarland. He identifies the liberal phases as reform ones and conservative phases as business ones, and he additionally identifies transitions from the reform ones to the business ones, with his Figure 1 roughly agreeing with Schlesinger's identifications.

Reform	Trans.	Business
		1890s
1901–14	1915–18	1919–33
1933–39	1940–48	1949–61
1961–74	1974–80	1980- ?

=== Huntington's periods of creedal passion ===
Historian Samuel P. Huntington has proposed that American history has had several bursts of "creedal passion". Huntington described the "American Creed" of government in these terms: "In terms of American beliefs, government is supposed to be egalitarian, participatory, open, noncoercive, and responsive to the demands of individuals and groups. Yet no government can be all these things and still remain a government." This contradiction produces an unavoidable gap between ideals and institutions, an "IvI" gap. This gap is normally tolerable, but it is a gap that sometimes leads to bursts of "creedal passion" against existing systems and institutions, bursts that typically last around 15 years. He identified four of them:

- 1770s: Revolutionary era
- 1830s: Jacksonian era
- 1900s: Progressive era
- 1960s: S&S: Sixties and Seventies (Huntington's name)

Huntington described 14 features of creedal-passion eras. Nine of them describe the general mood:

1. "Discontent was widespread; authority, hierarchy, specialization, and expertise were widely questioned or rejected."
2. "Political ideas were taken seriously and played an important role in the controversies of the time."
3. "Traditional American values of liberty, individualism, equality, popular control of government, and the openness of government were stressed in public discussion."
4. "Moral indignation over the IvI gap was widespread."
5. "Politics was characterized by agitation, excitement, commotion, even upheaval — far beyond the usual routine of interest-group conflict."
6. "Hostility toward power (the antipower ethic) was intense, with the central issue of politics often being defined as 'liberty versus power.'"
7. "The exposure or muckraking of the IvI gap was a central feature of politics."
8. "Movements flourished devoted to specific reforms or 'causes' (women, minorities, criminal justice, temperance, peace)."
9. "New media forms appeared, significantly increasing the influence of the media in politics."

The remaining five describe the resulting changes:

1. "Political participation expanded, often assuming new forms and often expressed through hitherto unusual channels."
2. "The principal political cleavages of the period tended to cut across economic class lines, with some combination of middle- and working-class groups promoting change."
3. "Major reforms were attempted in political institutions in order to limit power and reshape institutions in terms of American ideals (some of which were successful and some of which were lasting)."
4. "A basic realignment occurred in the relations between social forces and political institutions, often including but not limited to the political party system."
5. "The prevailing ethos promoting reform in the name of traditional ideals was, in a sense, both forward-looking and backward-looking, progressive and conservative."

=== Party systems and realignment elections ===
The United States has gone through several party systems, where in each system, the two main parties have characteristic platforms and constituencies. Likewise, the United States has had several realigning elections, elections that bring fast and large-scale changes. These events are mentioned here because their repeated occurrence may be interpreted as a kind of cycle.

Party systems
Begin	End	System
1792	1826	First Party System
1828	1854	Second Party System
1856	1894	Third Party System
1896	1930	Fourth Party System
1932	1974	Fifth Party System
1980	?	Sixth Party System

Opinions differ on the timing of the transition from the fifth to the sixth systems, opinions ranging from the 1960s to the 1990s. Some political scientists argue that it was a gradual transition, one without any well-defined date.

Realigning elections
Date	President
1800	Thomas Jefferson
1828	Andrew Jackson
1860	Abraham Lincoln
1896	William McKinley
1932	Franklin D. Roosevelt
1980	Ronald Reagan

Other dates sometimes cited are 1874, 1964 (Lyndon B. Johnson), 1968 (Richard Nixon), 1992 (Bill Clinton), 1994, 2008 (Barack Obama), and 2016 (Donald Trump).

=== Skowronek's presidency types ===
Political scientist Stephen Skowronek has proposed four main types of presidencies, and these types of presidencies fit into a cycle. He proposes that the United States has had several political regimes over its history, regimes with a characteristic cycle of presidency types. Each political regime has had a dominant party and an opposition party. Presidents can be in either the dominant party, or the opposition party.

Dominant Party	President's Party	Type
Vulnerable	Opposition	Reconstruction
Vulnerable	Dominant	Disjunction
Resilient	Opposition	Preemption
Resilient	Dominant	Articulation

The cycle begins with a reconstructive president, one who typically serves more than one term. He establishes a new regime, and his party becomes the dominant one for that regime. He is usually succeeded by his vice president, his successor is usually an articulation one, and that president usually serves only one term. This president is usually followed by a preemptive president, and articulating and preemptive presidents may continue to alternate. The cycle ends with one or more disjunctive presidents. Such presidents are typically loners, detached from their parties, considered ineffective, and serving only one term.

- Rec: Washington
- Dis: Adams, J.
- Rec: Jefferson
- Art: Madison
- Art: Monroe
- Dis: Adams, J. Q.
- Rec: Jackson
- Art: Van Buren
- Pre: Harrison, W. H.
- Pre: Tyler
- Art: Polk
- Pre: Taylor
- Pre: Fillmore
- Dis: Pierce
- Dis: Buchanan
- Rec: Lincoln
- Pre: Johnson, A.
- Art: Grant
- Art: Hayes
- Art: Garfield
- Art: Arthur
- Pre: Cleveland
- Art: Harrison, B.
- Art: McKinley
- Art: Roosevelt, T.
- Art: Taft
- Pre: Wilson
- Art: Harding
- Art: Coolidge
- Dis: Hoover
- Rec: Roosevelt, F. D.
- Art: Truman
- Pre: Eisenhower
- Art: Kennedy
- Art: Johnson, L. B.
- Pre: Nixon
- Pre: Ford
- Dis: Carter
- Rec: Reagan
- Art: Bush, G. H. W.
- Pre: Clinton
- Art: Bush, G. W.
- Pre: Obama
- ?: Trump
- ?: Biden
- Some of the articulating and preemptive presidents' types have been inferred from their party affiliations. George Washington is classified here as a reconstructing president because he was the first one. One source lists Theodore Roosevelt as a possible reconstructing president and not just an articulating one.

=== Klingberg's extroversion–introversion foreign-policy cycle ===
Historian Frank J. Klingberg proposed a theory for American foreign policy a cycle of alternating moods and tendencies that is somewhat similar to the Schlesingers' cycles. What he described as "the historical alternation of moods in American foreign policy" is an alternation between "extroversion", willingness to confront other nations and to expand American influence and territory, and "introversion", unwillingness to do so. He examined presidents' speeches, party platforms, naval expenditures, wars, and annexations, identifying in 1952 seven alternations since 1776. He and others have extended this work into more recent years, finding more alternations.

Klingberg phases of American foreign policy
From	To	Duration	Type	Events
1776	1798	22	Int	Revolution, establishment of government
1798	1824	26	Ext	French naval war, Louisiana Purchase, War of 1812
1824	1844	20	Int	Nullification Crisis, Texas question
1844	1871	27	Ext	Texas and Oregon annexations, Mexican War, Civil War
1871	1891	20	Int	(none)
1891	1919	28	Ext	Spanish-American War, World War I
1919	1940	21	Int	League of Nations rejections, Neutrality Acts
1940	1967	27	Ext	World War II, Cold War, Korean and Vietnam Wars
1967	1987	20	Int	Vietnamization, détente, dissolution of Soviet Union
1987	2016	29	Ext	Post-Cold-War assertion, Gulf War, War on Terror
2016	?	?	Int	

- Ext: Extroversion
- Int: Introversion
- (none): no events listed in the sources

Arthur Schlesinger Jr. concluded that this cycle is not synchronized with the liberal-conservative cycle, and for that reason, he concluded that these two cycles have separate causes.

== Cycles of other nations applied to the United States ==
Some cycles of history were first identified for other nations and later applied to the United States.

=== Turchin's long-term cycles ===
Biologist and quantitative historian Peter Turchin works on secular or long-term cycles in large-scale societies that have occurred over recorded human history. In summary:

- Integrative phase
  - Expansion: Common people well off, population increases, elites small and undemanding, state united, may conquer territory.
  - Stagflation: Elites rise, take more from the common people, immiserating them.
- Disintegrative phase
  - Crisis: Elites fight each other over the limited number of top positions, population declines, state may lose territory.
  - Depression / intercycle: attempts to rebuild the state.

Most of this work has been done for preindustrial societies, but he has extended that work to an industrialized nation, the United States. He has found a similar sort of cycle, though a faster one, about a century long instead of typically three or four centuries. His data on common-people well-being and elite overproduction, as well as on sociopolitical violence, show correlations similar to what one finds for preindustrial societies:

Peaks and troughs of social measures
Year	CPWB	EOP	SPV
1830	+	-	-
1890	-	+	+
1960	+	-	-
(direction)	-	+	+

- CPWB: common-people well-being: relative wage, labor supply, date of first marriage, physical health
- EOP: elite overproduction: top fortune, elite-university tuition, political polarization
- SPV: sociopolitical violence: terrorism, lynching, riots

In addition to the long cycle, this theory includes bursts of sociopolitical strife that are typically half a century apart, a two-generation or "fathers and sons" cycle. One generation fights, then the next generation does not want to repeat that experience. The following generation, with less memory, then fights again.

The US also has this cycle, with bursts of sociopolitical violence around 1870, 1920, and 1970, though not 1820, and this theory predicts one in 2020.

In 2010, Peter Turchin extrapolated conditions in the US and Western Europe, and he predicted an era of social violence in the 2020s. By the 2020s, some people considered that prediction to have come true, including himself.

=== Modelski's long cycles ===
George Modelski devised a cyclical theory of world leadership. Each cycle is about 100 years' duration and consists of four approximately equal phases:

1, Global War, which is 'characteristically naval' and results in a new global leader, providing global stability. The war is a 'decision process' analogous to a national election. The emerging global power typically enjoys a 'good war' with undamaged domestic infrastructure and a booming economy.

2, World Power, in which the new incumbent power 'prioritises global problems', mobilises a coalition, is decisive and innovative. For example, the UK after 1815 acted against the transatlantic slave trade and led the Congress system; the US after 1945 co-founded the UN, the IMF, GATT, and the Bretton Woods system.

3, Delegitimation. The hegemonic power falters and its moral authority is challenged by rival states.

4, Deconcentration. The hegemony's problem-solving capacity declines. Rival powers assert new nationalistic policies. A 'challenger' arises and a new global war begins. For example, today the USA faces challenges from Russia and China. Writing in 1987, Modelski forecast that the USSR (sic) would challenge American power from 2030, in a new global war.

According to Modelski the US has been the world leader since 1914, beginning with the defeat of rival powers in two world wars. Its rise to this position began in the 1850s as it pushed ahead of its then rivals, Germany and Russia, and formed coalitions with Great Britain, France and Japan. The previous world leaders were: Portugal 1492–1580 in the Age of Discovery; the Netherlands 1580–1688 beginning with the Eighty Years' War, 1579-1588; the United Kingdom (1) 1688–1792 beginning with the wars of Louis XIV; and the United Kingdom for a second time, 1792–1914, beginning with the French Revolution and Napoleonic wars

World leader nations tend to have: 'insular geography' and a strong naval power providing 'global reach'; a stable, open society; a strong economy; strategic organisation, and strong political parties. By contrast, the 'challenger' nations (in the past, Spain, France (twice) and Germany) have: closed systems; absolute rulers; domestic instability; continental geographic locations; and weaker naval power.

Modelski wrote that the cycle is a 'learning process' and a 'motor of modernity', providing leadership on a global scale. The cycle ushers in new waves of innovation in orderly fashion. Awareness of the cycle provides a balanced perspective, and a counter to the widespread belief in global anarchy.

==== Causes ====
1, Modelski writes, 'a similar more modest process may have occurred in Italy from 1000-1500 which then grew from a regional to a world level'. A similar regional cycle may have been present in China since 1,000, but ended with the death of Cheng Ho in 1435.

2, The cycle is driven by generational change. In the Global War phase of 25–30 years, world order under a hegemon is preferred but unavailable; in the World Power phase, order is both preferred and available; in the 3rd phase, Delegitimation, order is present but unpopular; in phase 4, Deconcentration, order is both unwanted and unavailable, leading to further disputes and a new global war.

3, According to Modelski, the cycle developed in parallel with the growth of the nation-state, political parties, command of the sea, and 'dependency of pre-modern communities'.

==== Forecasts ====
Modelski speculates that US deconcentration might be replaced by a power based in the 'Pacific rim' or by an explicit coalition of nations, as 'co-operation is urgently required in respect of nuclear weapons'. It is possible for the US to become world leader a second time, as Britain did in the 19th century.. By 2100, Modelski suggested in 2012, progress may lead to global leadership 'anchored in a community of democracies'.

==== Critical response ====
Modelski admits the system is flawed, lacking in coherence or solidarity; it also fails to address the North-South divide. But he 'dismisses the idea that international relations are anarchic'. His research, influenced by Immanuel Wallerstein, was 'measured in decades... a major achievement' says Peter J. Taylor

Colin Flint saw several flaws in the argument. It is deterministic, incapable of prediction; 'Portugal's 16th century history does not determine the US's 21st century future.' Modelski took a state-centric view which focused on rich countries and ignored the Global South. Flint also questions whether naval power is still relevant in a time of cruise missiles, satellites and drones.

Rosecrance (1987) raised the omission of the land wars in 17th century Europe, and whether Spain was at least as powerful as Portugal in the 16th century. Modelski and Thompson in 1988 addressed these points.

Chinese leaders reject the idea of hegemony, and use the word as an insult.

Joshua S Goldstein says however that long cycles are not mechanistic or deterministic, but 'evolutionary and dynamic' and therefore do have predictive power.

== Criticism ==
=== Spurious Cycles ===
In "Cycling through American Politics", David Resnick and Norman Thomas have a section on spurious cycles, describing

1. Procrustean cycles, "where the investigator massages the data to fit some preconceived cyclical theory".
2. Random cycles, "constructed with good data, but the pattern discovered is itself the result of random factors".

=== Sean Trende and Realignment Theory ===
in his 2012 book The Lost Majority, Sean Trende (senior elections analyst at RealClearPolitics), who argues against realignment theory and the "emerging Democratic majority" thesis proposed by journalist John Judis and political scientist Ruy Teixeira, states: "Almost none of the theories propounded by realignment theorists has endured the test of time... It turns out that finding a 'realigning' election is a lot like finding an image of Jesus in a grilled-cheese sandwich – if you stare long enough and hard enough, you will eventually find what you are looking for." In August 2013, Trende observed that U.S. presidential election results from 1880 through 2012 form a 0.96 correlation with the expected sets of outcomes (i.e. events) in the binomial distribution of a fair coin experiment.

In May 2015, statistician and FiveThirtyEight editor-in-chief Nate Silver argued against a blue wall Electoral College advantage for the Democratic Party in the 2016 U.S. presidential election, and in post-election analysis cited Trende in noting that "there are few if any permanent majorities". Both Silver and Trende argued that the "emerging Democratic majority" thesis led most news coverage and commentary preceding the election to overstate Hillary Clinton's chances of being elected.

== See also ==
- Cycle of violence
- Deterministic system
- Fat pope, thin pope
- Social cycle theory
- Strauss–Howe generational theory
- Structural-demographic theory
