= Open society =

Political term coined by Henri Bergson in 1932

Open society (French: société ouverte) is a term coined by French philosopher Henri Bergson in 1932, and describes a dynamic system inclined to moral universalism. Bergson contrasted an open society with what he called a closed society, a closed system of law, morality or religion. Bergson suggests that if all traces of civilization were to disappear, the instincts of the closed society for including or excluding others would remain.

The idea of an open society was further developed during World War II by the Austrian-born Jewish philosopher Karl Popper. Popper saw it as part of a historical continuum reaching from the organic, tribal, or closed society, through the open society (marked by a critical attitude to tradition) to the abstract or depersonalized society lacking all face-to-face interaction transactions.

== History ==
Popper saw the classical Greeks as initiating the slow transition from tribalism towards the open society, and as facing for the first time the strain imposed by the less personal group relations entailed thereby.

Whereas tribalistic and collectivist societies do not distinguish between natural laws and social customs, so that individuals are unlikely to challenge traditions they believe to have a sacred or magical basis, the beginnings of an open society are marked by a distinction between natural and man-made law, and an increase in personal responsibility and accountability for moral choices (not incompatible with religious belief).

Popper argued that the ideas of individuality, criticism, and humanitarianism cannot be suppressed once people have become aware of them, and therefore that it is impossible to return to the closed society, but at the same time recognized the continuing emotional pull of what he called "the lost group spirit of tribalism", as manifested for example in the totalitarianisms of the 20th century.

While the period since Popper's study has undoubtedly been marked by the spread of the open society, this may be attributed less to Popper's advocacy and more to the role of the economic advances of late modernity. Growth-based industrial societies require literacy, anonymity and social mobility from their members — elements incompatible with much tradition-based behavior but demanding the ever-wider spread of the abstract social relations that Georg Simmel saw as characterizing the metropolitan mental stance.

== Definition ==
Karl Popper defined the open society as one "in which an individual is confronted with personal decisions" as opposed to a "magical or tribal or collectivist society."

He considered that only democracy provides an institutional mechanism for reform and leadership change without the need for bloodshed, revolution or coup d'état.

== Critical knowledge ==
Popper's concept of the open society is epistemological rather than political. When Popper wrote The Open Society and Its Enemies, he believed that the social sciences had failed to grasp the significance and the nature of fascism and communism because these sciences were based on what he saw to be faulty epistemology. Totalitarianism forced knowledge to become political which made critical thinking impossible and led to the destruction of knowledge in totalitarian countries.

Popper's theory that knowledge is provisional and fallible implies that society must be open to alternative points of view. An open society is associated with cultural and religious pluralism; it is always open to improvement because knowledge is never completed but always ongoing: "if we wish to remain human, then there is only one way, the way into the open society ... into the unknown, the uncertain and insecure".

In the closed society, claims to certain knowledge and ultimate truth lead to the attempted imposition of one version of reality. Such a society is closed to freedom of thought. In contrast, in an open society each citizen needs to engage in critical thinking, which requires freedom of thought and expression and the cultural and legal institutions that can facilitate this.

== Further characteristics ==
Humanitarianism, equality and political freedom are ideally fundamental characteristics of an open society. This was recognized by Pericles, a statesman of the Athenian democracy, in his laudatory funeral oration: "advancement in public life falls to reputation for capacity, class considerations not being allowed to interfere with merit; nor again does poverty bar the way, if a man is able to serve the state, he is not hindered by the obscurity of his condition. The freedom which we enjoy in our government extends also to our ordinary life."

Arguably however it was the tension between a traditional society and the new, more open space of the emerging polis which most fully marked classical Athens, and Popper was very aware of the continuing emotional appeal of what he called "holism...longing for the lost unity of tribal life" into the modern world.

== Caveats ==
Investor and philanthropist George Soros, a self-described follower of Karl Popper, argued that sophisticated use of powerful techniques of subtle deception borrowed from modern advertising and cognitive science by conservative political operatives such as Frank Luntz and Karl Rove casts doubt on Popper's view of open society. Because the electorate's perception of reality can easily be manipulated, democratic political discourse does not necessarily lead to a better understanding of reality. Soros argues that in addition to the need for separation of powers, free speech, and free elections, an explicit commitment to the pursuit of truth is imperative. "Politicians will respect, rather than manipulate, reality only if the public cares about the truth and punishes politicians when it catches them in deliberate deception."

Popper however, did not identify the open society either with democracy or with capitalism or a laissez-faire economy, but rather with a critical frame of mind on the part of the individual, in the face of communal group think of whatever kind. An important aspect in Popper's thinking is the notion that the truth can be lost. Critical attitude does not mean that the truth is found.

== See also ==
- Civil inattention
- Freedom of information
- Liberal democracy
- Open–closed political spectrum
- Open business
- Open government
- Open Society Institute
- Open source governance
- Social equilibrium
- The Transparent Society
- The Wealth of Networks
