= Political eras of the United States =

Model of American politics

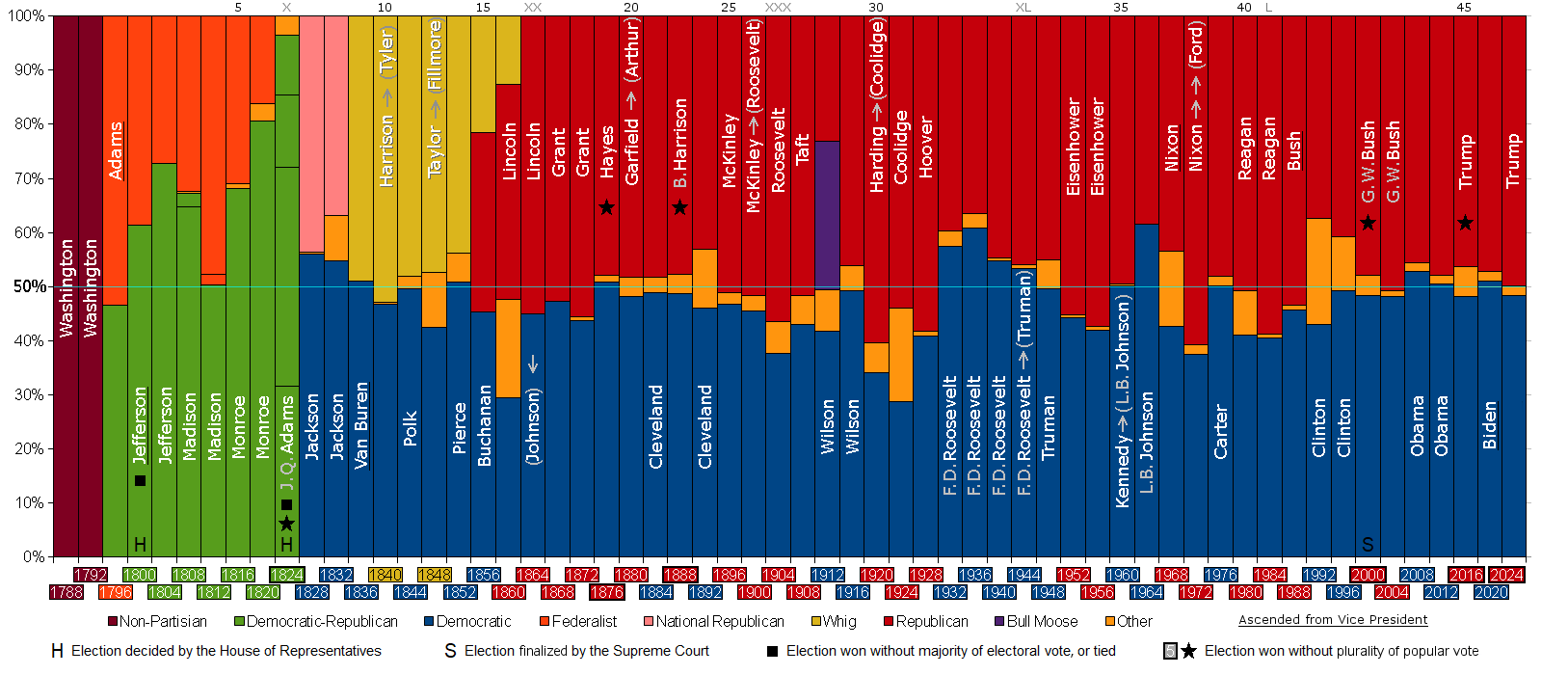
Popular votes to political parties during presidential elections

Political parties derivation. Dotted line means unofficially.

Timeline of the development of American political parties and the various party eras

Political eras of the United States refer to a model of American politics used in history and political science to periodize the political party system existing in the United States.

The United States Constitution is silent on the subject of political parties. The Founding Fathers did not originally intend for American politics to be partisan. In Federalist Papers No. 9 and No. 10, Alexander Hamilton and James Madison, respectively, wrote specifically about the dangers of domestic political factions. In addition, the first President of the United States, George Washington, was not a member of any political party at the time of his election or throughout his tenure as president. Furthermore, he hoped that political parties would not be formed, fearing conflict and stagnation, as outlined in his Farewell Address.

Generally, the political history of America can be divided into eras in which partisan hegemonic control of the federal government (either through unified partisan control of the Presidency and Congress, or when a Congress of the opposing party to the President is out of session) occurs for a continuous majority of time. These hegemonic eras are:

- 1789 (Note: Era is ushered in by the Presidency of Virginian General George Washington, a prominent leader of the American Revolution.)–1801: Federalist Era, dominated by the nationalist-leaning Federalists, and their ideological predecessors in the Pro-Administration Faction, both based in the Northern United States.
- 1801 (Note: Era is ushered in by the Presidency of Virginian Vice President Thomas Jefferson, a prominent leader of the American Revolution.) (Note: When Democratic-Republican Thomas Jefferson began his Presidency in March 1801 the Senate held a two-day special Senate session with an ongoing Federalist majority, which briefly stalled the inauguration of the first unified Democratic-Republican government, though the session was only called by outgoing President John Adams so that the Senate could provide advice to the new President. After the Senate ended its two-day session the Democratic-Republicans had unified government control through the Presidency alone, and by the time the Congress began its first regular session in December 1801 to start official business the Democratic-Republicans had gained the Senate majority and thus, with the House and with President Jefferson, had unified government control throughout that first session, for the remaining 8 years of Jefferson’s presidency, and for the next several years.)–1861: Democratic Era, dominated by the liberal-leaning Democrats, and their ideological predecessors the Democratic-Republicans (Note: The Democratic-Republicans were known during their time as "Republicans" by most of their own members and as "Democrats" by their Federalist opponents. The name "Democratic-Republican" was rarely used at that time and is used retroactively by academics to distinguish it from its ideological successor the liberal Democratic Party and from the ideologically opposing conservative National Republican and abolitionist Republican parties.), both based in the more slave sparse Southern U.S areas (Note: Before the accelerated rise of dense slave centers in the Black Belt in the late 1810s (before these counties had high % slave population), the Democratic-Republicans dominated the entirety of the South. As the Black Belt quickly became more densely filled with slaves (and Black Belt counties grew in % slave population), the future Whig opposition party made electoral inroads in the Jeffersonian/Jacksonian South by winning the support of the wealthier slave owners that dominated these slave dense counties. It remains a constant that the Democratic-Republicans and their ideological successors the Democrats both dominated slave-sparse Southern populations.) to the non-coastal Northern counties.
- 1861 (Note: Era is ushered in by the Presidency of Illinoisan Congressman (Note: After serving in Congress’ House of Representatives, Lincoln was elected to the Illinois legislature in 1854, but before that term began in January 1855 he declined to serve in the state legislative seat so that he would be eligible to be a candidate in the upcoming U.S. Senate election. Thus Lincoln’s most recent position before the Presidency was as Congressman.) Abraham Lincoln, a prominent leader of the American Civil War.)–1933: Republican Era, dominated by socially liberal and economic conservative Republicans based in New England and the Great Lakes Region (and later the greater Rust Belt region and the Midwestern United States).
- 1933 (Note: Era is ushered in by the Presidency of New York Governor Franklin D. Roosevelt, a prominent leader of the Great Depression and World War II.)–1969: New Deal Democratic Era, dominated by a coalition of socially conservative Democrats based in the South and economically progressive Democrats based in the greater Rust Belt region, the Sun Belt and the West Coast of the United States. This marks the beginning of the "party switch" – liberals in the North and Urban Cities slowly flip Democratic.
- 1969 (Note: Era is ushered in by the Vice Presidency and Presidency of New York/Californian (Note: New York then California were Nixon’s home states during his Presidency, though his primary home state was California where he was born and served as Senator.) Richard Nixon, a prominent figure of the Vietnam War and the Watergate Scandal.)–Present: Divided Government Era, where the Federal Government is predominantly divided (between Presidency and/or Congress when an oppositional Congress is in session). Power is split between liberal Democrats based in the North and West Coast & conservative Republicans based in the Midwest and South. This marks the finalization of the "party switch" – conservatives in the South and Rurals slowly flip Republican. A process that was completed by the 2010s and the start of the Trump era.

The political significance of these five defined eras can be reinforced by the feature of each era beginning with near-unanimous Electoral College presidential victories that occur alongside the election of a unified trifecta of House, Senate and President for the hegemonic party (or alongside the election of divided government in the fifth era):

- Washington's first unanimous election in 1788–89 was won with a unified trifecta of Pro-Administration members (ideological predecessors to Federalists).
- Thomas Jefferson and James Monroe's re-election landslides in 1804 and 1820 respectively were won with unified trifectas of Democratic-Republicans (ideological predecessors to Democrats).
- Abraham Lincoln's landslide re-election in 1864 as the candidate of the Republican-affiliated National Union Party was won with a unified Republican trifecta.
- Franklin D. Roosevelt's landslide election to a second term in 1936 was won with a unified Democratic trifecta.
- Richard Nixon's landslide re-election and Ronald Reagan's two landslide elections, in 1972, 1980, and 1984 respectively, were won alongside the election of divided governments (Nixon lost both Houses of Congress while Reagan lost the House of Representatives both times).

Using these hegemonic eras as a framework, the more detailed specifics of party realignments and the seven party systems they take place in are described in detail below:

== First Party System: Federalist & Democratic-Republican Hegemony ==
The "First Party System" began in the 1790s with the 1792 re-election of George Washington and the 1796 election of John Adams, and ended in the 1820s with the presidential elections of 1824 and of 1828, resulting in Andrew Jackson's presidency.

=== George Washington's cabinet ===
The beginnings of the American two-party system emerged from George Washington's immediate circle of advisers, which split into two camps:

- Federalists – John Adams and Alexander Hamilton emerged as leaders of this camp; electoral base is in the North. They were the right leaning party of the era.
- Democratic-Republicans – Thomas Jefferson and James Madison emerged as leaders of this camp; the electoral base is in the South and Non-Coastal North. They were the left leaning party of the era.

Ironically, Hamilton and Madison wrote the Federalist Papers against political factions, but ended up being the core leaders in this emerging party system. Although distasteful to the participants, by the time John Adams and Thomas Jefferson ran for president in 1796, partisanship in the United States came to being.

=== Era of Good Feelings ===
This era was dominated by the Democratic-Republican party as the Federalists became irrelevant. The disastrous Panic of 1819 and the Supreme Court's McCulloch v. Maryland reanimated the disputes over the supremacy of state sovereignty and federal power, between strict construction of the US Constitution and loose construction. The Missouri Crisis in 1820 made the explosive political conflict between slave and free soil open and explicit. Only through the adroit handling of the legislation by Speaker of the House Henry Clay was a settlement reached and disunion avoided.

=== Jacksonian democracy ===
"Jacksonian democracy" is a term to describe the 19th-century political philosophy that originated with the seventh U.S. president, The United States presidential election of 1824 brought partisan politics to a fever pitch, with General Andrew Jackson's popular vote victory (and his plurality in the United States Electoral College being overturned in the United States House of Representatives).

With the decline in political consensus, it became imperative to revive Jeffersonian principles on the basis of Southern exceptionalism. The agrarian alliance, North and South, would be revived to form Jacksonian Nationalism and the rise of the Democratic-Republican Party. As a result, the Democratic-Republican Party split into a Jacksonian faction that was regionally and ideologically identical to the original party, which became the modern Democratic Party in the 1830s, and a Henry Clay faction that regionally and ideologically resembled the old Federalist Party, which was absorbed by Clay's Whig Party. The term "Jacksonian democracy" was in active use by the 1830s.

== Second Party System: Democrat Hegemony ==
Many historians and political scientists use "Second Party System" to describe American politics between the mid-1820s until the mid-1850s. The system was demonstrated by rapidly rising levels of voter interest (with high election day turnouts), rallies, partisan newspapers, and high degrees of personal loyalty to parties. It was in full swing with the 1828 United States presidential election, since the Federalists shrank to a few isolated strongholds and the Democratic-Republicans lost unity during the buildup to the American Civil War.

This party system marked the first in a series of political realignments, a process in which a prominent third party coalition, often one that wins >10% of the popular vote in multiple states in a presidential election, realigns into one of the major parties, allowing that major party to dominate the federal government and/or presidency for the following decades. The first and most significant Second Party System realignment was a realignment of the differing factions of the Democratic-Republican Party of the more slave sparse Southern areas and the non-coastal Northern counties, particularly those factions that voted for Andrew Jackson, Henry Clay and William H. Crawford, into the new Jacksonian/Democratic Party.

The opposition, leftover Federalist-aligned voters who formed the Clay and Adams factions in the Coastal North, realigned into the National Republican Party in 1828. This northern base, alongside the wealthy slave owners of the dense Southern slave centers and the Anti-Masons in Vermont, Massachusetts, Northern New York state and Southern Pennsylvania, realigned into the newly formed Whig Party in 1836. With the fall of the Whig Party in 1856, the remaining Whig coalition (those not effected by the Free Soil movement in New England and the Great Lakes Region) realigned into the Know Nothing ticket that same year then realigned into the Constitutional Union Party in 1860 at the start of the next party system.

The political party system of the United States was dominated by two major parties:

- The Jacksonian Democrats led by Andrew Jackson. The Jacksonian Democrats stood for the "sovereignty of the people" as expressed in popular demonstrations, constitutional conventions, and majority rule as a general principle of governing,
- The Whig Party, assembled by Henry Clay from the National Republicans and from other opponents of Jackson. Whigs advocated the rule of law, written and unchanging constitutions, public investment of infrastructure and education, and protections for minority interests against majority tyranny.

After taking office in 1829, President Andrew Jackson restructured a number of federal institutions. Jackson's professed philosophy became the nation's dominant political worldview for the remainder of the 1830s, helping his vice president (Martin Van Buren) secure election in the presidential election of 1836. In the presidential election of 1840, the "Whig Party" had its first national victory with the election of General William Henry Harrison, but he died shortly after assuming office in 1841. John Tyler (a self-proclaimed "Democrat") succeeded Harrison, as the first Vice President of the United States to ascend to the presidency via death of the incumbent.

Minor parties of the era included:

- the Anti-Masonic Party, an important innovator from 1827 to 1834
- the abolitionist Liberty Party in the 1840s.
- the anti-slavery expansion Free Soil Party in 1848 and 1852.

== Third Party System: Republican Hegemony ==
The "Third Party System" refers to the period which came into focus in the 1850s (during the leadup to the American Civil War) and ended in the 1890s. The issues of focus during this time: Slavery, the civil war, Reconstruction, race, and monetary issues.

The Third Party System was marked by a realignment of the Free Soil Party movement of New England and the Great Lakes Region into the Republican Party after the 1856 election, and a realignment of the more northern portion of Whigs, Constitutional Union voters and Know Nothing voters along the Coastal Midatlantic into the Democratic Party after the 1864 election.

It was dominated by the new Republican Party, which claimed success in saving the Union, abolishing slavery and enfranchising the freedmen, while adopting many Whig-style modernization programs such as national banks, railroads, high tariffs, homesteads, social spending (such as on greater Civil War veteran pension funding), and aid to land grant colleges. While most elections from 1876 through 1892 were extremely close, the opposition Democrats won only the 1884 and 1892 presidential elections (the Democrats also won the popular vote in the 1876 and 1888 presidential elections, but lost the electoral college vote), although from 1875 to 1895 the party usually controlled the United States House of Representatives and controlled the United States Senate from 1879 to 1881 and 1893–1895. Indeed, scholarly work and electoral evidence emphasizes that after the 1876 election the South's former slave centers, which before the emancipation of Republican-voting African Americans was electorally dominated by voting wealthy slave owners who made up the southern base of Whigs, Know Nothings and Constitutional Unionists, realigned into the Democratic Party due to the end of Reconstruction; this new electoral base for the Democrats would finish realigning around 1904. The overall national support for Reconstruction collapsed around 1876 as well. The northern and western states were largely Republican, except for the closely balanced New York, Indiana, New Jersey, and Connecticut. After 1876, the Democrats took control of the "Solid South".

Historians and political scientists generally believe that the Third Party System ended in the mid-1890s, which featured profound developments in issues of American nationalism, modernization, and race. This period, the later part of which is often termed the Gilded Age, is defined by its contrast with the preceding and following eras.

== Fourth Party System: Republican Hegemony ==
The "Fourth Party System" is the term used in political science and history for the period in American political history from the mid-1890s to the early 1930s, It was dominated by the Republican Party, excepting when 1912 split in which Democrats (led by President Woodrow Wilson) held the White House for eight years. American history texts usually call the period the Progressive Era. The concept was introduced under the name "System of 1896" by E. E. Schattschneider in 1960, and the numbering scheme was added by political scientists in the mid-1960s.

The realignments that marked the beginning of the Fourth Party System was that of the Greenback Party, which dominated the greater Rust Belt region (which included upstate New York, Massachusetts, New Jersey and Baltimore), into the GOP after 1896, and the realignment of the Populist Party, which dominated the Midwest, into the Republican Party after the 1900 and 1904 elections.

The era began in the severe depression of 1893 and the extraordinarily intense election of 1896. It included the Progressive Era, World War I, and the start of the Great Depression. The Great Depression caused a realignment that produced the Fifth Party System, dominated by the Democratic New Deal coalition until the 1970s.

The central domestic issues concerned government regulation of railroads and large corporations ("trusts"), the money issue (gold versus silver), the protective tariff, the role of labor unions, child labor, the need for a new banking system, corruption in party politics, primary elections, the introduction of the federal income tax, direct election of senators, racial segregation, efficiency in government, women's suffrage, and control of immigration. Foreign policy centered on the 1898 Spanish–American War, Imperialism, the Mexican Revolution, World War I, and the creation of the League of Nations. Dominant personalities included presidents William McKinley (R), Theodore Roosevelt (R), and Woodrow Wilson (D), three-time presidential candidate William Jennings Bryan (D), and Wisconsin's progressive Republican Robert M. La Follette Sr.

The Fourth Party System ended with the Great Depression, a worldwide economic depression that started in 1929. A few years after the Wall Street Crash of 1929, Herbert Hoover lost the 1932 United States presidential election to Franklin D. Roosevelt.

== Fifth Party System: New Deal Democrat Hegemony ==
The Fifth Party System describes a period in American history from the 1930s to the early 1980s in which progressives in the North and conservative Democrats in the South joined a broad coalition called the "New Deal Coalition" to share control of government over the more business-aligned Republican Party, particularly as a result of the Republican Party's failure to contain the Great Depression while in power in the early 1930s.

The Fifth Party System began as a result of a realignment of the Progressive Party of the Western Coast and the greater Rust Belt region (which includes New York, Massachusetts, Baltimore and New Jersey), and a realignment of the Socialist Party of the Western Coast and Sun Belt, into the otherwise conservative Democratic Party after the 1932 and 1936 elections.

Key figures of the Fifth Party System include Franklin D. Roosevelt, the key founder of the New Deal Coalition and president during most of the Great Depression and most of World War II; Harry S. Truman, successor to Franklin Roosevelt; John F. Kennedy; and civil rights champion Lyndon B. Johnson.

Because there has been no significant change of hands in Congress since the beginning of the Fifth Party System, historians have trouble placing dates and specifications for the modern party systems that succeed this one.

== Sixth Party System: Divided Government under conservative dominance ==
The Sixth Party System describes a system that began in 1980, known for the period in which Republicans used the "Southern strategy" to realign Dixiecrats from the South into the party, which began in 1964 when Barry Goldwater became the first Republican since Reconstruction to win the Deep South (although he lost the overall South) (Note: Since Reconstruction, Hoover in 1928 and Eisenhower in 1956 were the only Republicans to win the overall South though they both lost the Deep South.) and finalized in 1984 when Reagan kept the South permanently Republican. This allowed the party to gain dominant control of the Presidency after 1968 or 1980, though dominant control of Congress would remain in Democratic hands because of the Southern seats in Congress remaining a solid Democratic bloc until the Republicans flipped the Congressional South in the 1994 Republican Revolution. Because of this realignment lag the first half of this party system is heavily dominated by ticket-splitting (i.e. the "Nixon Democrats" and "Reagan Democrats"). Then, a second realignment occurred amongst Centrist "Independent" voters from the North and West who supported John B. Anderson and Ross Perot into the Democratic Party from 1996 to 2008, allowing the Democrats to make the Presidency competitive. This half of the party system is dominated by polarization.

== Seventh Party System: The Populist Era ==
Some political scientists suggest that a new party system (Seventh Party System) may be emerging in the United States, especially following Donald Trump's 2016 election and the resulting realignment of party coalitions.

This shift is often linked to the broader international wave of populism, which challenges liberal-democratic institutions and party structures.
