= The Emerging Democratic Majority =

2002 book by John Judis and Ruy Teixeira

- Author: John Judis, Ruy Teixeira
- Language: English
- Publisher: Scribner
- Publication date: 2002
- Dewey Decimal: 324.0973
- LC Class: JK2316 .J83

The Emerging Democratic Majority is a 2002 book by John Judis and Ruy Teixeira which argued that certain demographic and social changes in the United States at the turn of the 21st century were creating a political landscape that favored the Democratic Party. The book's thesis was later disavowed by both of its writers with differing explanations.

The book's central argument is that the Democratic Party would become dominant due to adherence to "a progressive centrism," an ideology maintained by the party from the presidency of Bill Clinton. In November 2024, Teixeira blamed Democratic defeat in the presidential elections of 2016 and 2024 on the party discarding this ideology at the beginning of Barack Obama's second term.

In a 2015 essay The Emerging Republican Advantage, Judis no longer predicted a longterm Democratic majority but rather an "unstable equilibrium" between the parties, as Hispanics and Asians were considerably less Democratic than he had assumed, while white working class voters were abandoning the Democratic Party.

== See also ==
- The Emerging Republican Majority - Book by Kevin Phillips
- Clintonism
- Third Way
