= Open–closed political spectrum =

Alternative to the left-right political spectrum

The open–closed political spectrum, an alternative to the standard left–right political spectrum, describes a cleavage observed in political systems in Europe and North America in the 21st century. Under this view, parties and voters are understood on a single-axis political spectrum from open (culturally liberal and globalist) to closed (culturally conservative and protectionist). Groups, leaders, and citizens on either end of this spectrum draw from traditionally left- and right-wing ideas and values. For example, closed parties usually hold conventionally right-wing views on social issues but may support the left-wing policies of market intervention and redistribution of wealth. Open groups, leaders, and citizens can hold left-wing or progressivist opinions on many issues but be staunchly in favor of the traditionally more right-wing free trade policies. Depending on the context, open–closed can replace the left–right political spectrum or be a second axis on a political compass.

Political scientists have described a political realignment across the Western world due to the 2008 financial crisis, the Great Recession, and the 2015 European migrant crisis, with mainstream left-wing and right-wing political parties shifting or falling behind populist parties and independent politicians. Examples of votes fought on open-closed lines include the 2015 Polish parliamentary election, the 2016 Austrian presidential election, the 2016 United Kingdom European Union membership referendum, the 2016 United States presidential election, the 2017 Dutch general election, and the 2017 French presidential election.

== Precursors and terminology ==
Before the development of socialism in the late 19th and early 20th centuries, the primary divide in British politics was between classical liberalism (Whiggism) and traditionalist conservatism (Toryism), as seen in debates about free trade and the Corn Laws and James Kirkup, writing in the Daily Telegraph, has suggested that the open-closed split marks a return to this era of politics. In the United States, the rise of the socially liberal New Left and the socially conservative religious right in the 1970s, and the subsequent "culture wars," marked the beginning of the open-closed cleavage. Fareed Zakaria, writing in the Washington Post, described the Nordic model of free market social democracy as another early example of open politics.

Stephan Shakespeare, director of public opinion research at YouGov, identified the divide by analyzing the party positions in the 2005 UK general election but termed closed and open voters "drawbridge up" and "drawbridge down," respectively. Former British prime minister Tony Blair first used the terms "open" and "closed" for this divide in 2006 regarding the horseshoe theory, which states that far-left and far-right politics are similar in substance. Blair, who declared himself staunchly "open," had overseen the development of the Third Way New Labour movement in the 1990s, and the schism in the Labour Party between "open" Blairites and "closed" traditional socialists has remained. Political analyst James Bloodworth criticized Blair's choice of terminology, describing "closed" as pejorative to those threatened by globalism and "open" as overly laudatory of the "Davos Man" type of globalist.

== Rise and development ==
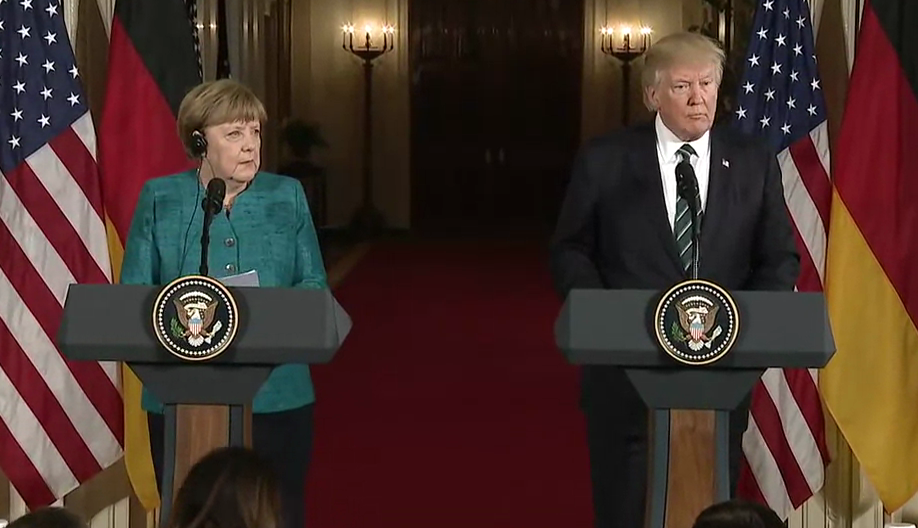
Although both are conservatives, the "open" Angela Merkel and "closed" Donald Trump fall at opposite ends of the spectrum.

Following the 2008 financial crisis and the Great Recession, and the arrival of refugees of the Syrian civil war, populist political parties made significant gains across the European Union. In southern European countries, these tended to be anti-austerity left-wing parties, such as Syriza in Greece and Podemos in Spain. In contrast, northern European countries saw anti-immigrant right-wing parties such as the UK Independence Party and the Alternative for Germany gain support. However, all these parties shared a Eurosceptic and anti-elite viewpoint and appealed to the "left-behind" who saw their livelihoods or communities as threatened by globalism and immigration. In 2015, Syriza became the largest party in the Parliament of Greece, while the right-wing populist Law and Justice became the first party since the fall of Communism to win an absolute majority in the Polish Sejm in the election the same year. At the 2016 United Kingdom European Union membership referendum, the Leave option narrowly defeated the cross-party Remain option. The subsequent realignment of British politics saw the Conservatives, aligned with "Leave," and Liberal Democrats, aligned with "Remain," rise in the polls while Labour, which remained deeply divided between its open and closed wings, lost ground rapidly.

Similar political developments followed in the United States in the run-up to the 2016 presidential election. Democratic nominee Hillary Clinton, liberal and pro-globalism, faced two political opponents who both represented protectionist viewpoints from opposite ends of the left–right spectrum: Bernie Sanders, a democratic socialist who challenged her in the primaries, and the Republican nominee Donald Trump, running on a nativist "America First" platform. Trump eventually triumphed, winning several Rust Belt states from the "Blue Wall" of Democratic safe states, which had suffered deindustrialization and economic deprivation.

While "closed" politicians scored several electoral victories, another realignment in the political center began in Europe, as cosmopolitan pro-European voters abandoned traditional government parties and clustered around new liberal parties and independent politicians. In the Netherlands, where the closed anti-Islam and anti-European Party for Freedom (PVV) under Geert Wilders led opinion polls for much of the previous parliament, the liberal pro-EU Democrats 66 and the green GroenLinks positioned themselves as the primary open opponents of the PVV. In the 2017 election, all three parties made significant gains at the expense of the established parties.

Alexander Van der Bellen, an independent formerly of The Greens, defeated the anti-immigrant Norbert Hofer of the Freedom Party of Austria in the 2016 Austrian presidential election, while Emmanuel Macron, a former member of the Socialists who described himself as "neither left nor right" and who founded his party En Marche, defeated the Front National candidate Marine Le Pen in the 2017 French presidential election. In both cases, neither of the mainstream left and right parties reached the second round of voting – instead, each election saw an open centrist independent against a closed far-right party.

== Open and closed policies ==
Although they can come from all sides of the left–right spectrum, closed and open parties share common ground on many issues.

=== Immigration and social integration ===
Opposition to immigration is among the starkest divides between open and closed parties. The closed position supports restrictions on migration and prefers that immigrants integrate into the national culture. By contrast, the open position takes a more liberal stance on migration and tolerates or even celebrates multiculturalism. Both left-wing and right-wing parties can be closed on the topic of immigration: the conservative Polish Law and Justice accuses immigrants of undermining Polish values and bringing in terrorists. At the same time, the socialist German Left Party considers immigrants a drain on the welfare state. Conversely, in the United Kingdom, for example, the Adam Smith Institute (a neoliberal right-wing organization) and Vince Cable (a center-left social democrat and former business secretary) stand together as some of the strongest defenders of immigration.

=== Trade and economic integration ===
Issues of international trade and international cooperation are another significant line of division between the two camps. In the open ideology, free trade and globalism are net good, strengthening the national economy and providing jobs while cutting prices. In the closed ideology, free trade harms the national economy by encouraging companies to offshore industries, resulting in lower wages and higher unemployment and potentially threatening national culture. The closed attitude to globalism opposes trade agreements such as the Transatlantic Trade and Investment Partnership, military alliances such as NATO, and supranational unions such as the EU, which the open side generally supports.

=== Elites and anti-establishmentism ===
Pro-closed politicians opposing free trade and immigration usually describe these as impositions from an existing political elite, either within the country or outside its borders, and campaign on an anti-establishment platform. In the most extreme case, this can cross over into conspiracism, alleging that shadowy figures are actively trying to harm the nation.

=== Identity ===
Identity politics plays a role in forming both the open and closed coalitions. Pro-closed voters tend to have a strong sense of national identity, while pro-open ones share a more cosmopolitan identity. This does not mean that all closed voters are racist, nor that all open voters are unpatriotic. The arrival of newcomers can enhance nationalist pride if they quickly assimilate into the national culture. Conversely, some open politicians, such as Jesse Klaver, leader of GroenLinks, and Emmanuel Macron, have succeeded in developing a patriotic alternative to nationalism in which tolerance and cooperation are themselves considered national values to be prized and protected.

== Demographics of cleavage ==
Political scientists have identified several cleavage lines between supporters of open and closed parties. Educational attainment was the strongest predictor of voting preference in the Brexit referendum and the 2016/2017 US, Dutch, and French elections: in each case, those with low educational achievement were more likely to vote for the closed or populist option. The BBC described this as "one of the most remarkable features of the US election," as the Republican Party usually performs well among university graduates.

Income has been suggested as another dividing line: in the EU referendum, the bottom fifth of UK earners overwhelmingly voted for Brexit (68% Leave, 32% Remain), while most of the top quarter voted against Brexit (39% Leave, 61% Remain). However, Trump performed better with middle-class voters than the highest or lowest earners. Although a small wealth effect was seen among French voters, this disappeared when controlling for education.

Pessimism and optimism are important psychological factors in determining whether a voter chooses an open or a closed candidate. Le Pen only took 20% of the vote of those who believed the situation would improve for the next generation, but over 40% among those who thought it would deteriorate. Most Leave voters agreed that life in Britain was worse than thirty years ago, while most Remain voters disagreed.

== See also ==
- Identity politics
- Liberal democracy and illiberal democracy
- Open society
