= Ruy Teixeira =

American political scientist and commentator (born 1951)

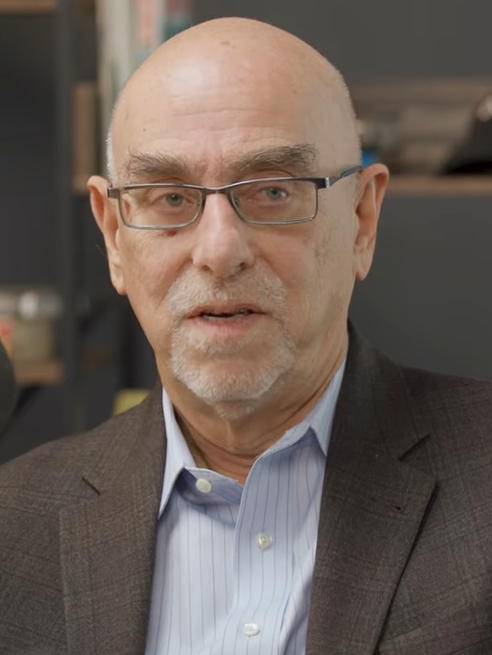
- Teixeira in 2024
- Born: December 15, 1951 (age 74); Washington, D.C., US
- Education: Yale University; University of Michigan (BA); University of Wisconsin, Madison (MS, PhD)

Ruy Teixeira (/ˈruːi təˈʃɛrə/; born December 15, 1951) is an American political scientist and commentator. He is a senior fellow at the centre-right think tank American Enterprise Institute and co-founder and politics editor of the Substack newsletter The Liberal Patriot, along with John Halpin.

He is known for his work on political demography, particularly for the book The Emerging Democratic Majority (2002), which he co-wrote with John Judis. In it, they argue that the US Democratic Party is demographically destined to become a majority party in the early 21st century, a thesis that he later disavowed, citing the rise of the progressive movement in the United States.

== Life and career ==
Ruy Teixeira was born in Washington, DC, the son of a Portuguese diplomat, and grew up in Silver Spring, Maryland. After graduate school, he moved to New York and worked for a polling firm for a year before moving to Washington to do consulting work, chiefly at Abt Associates. In 1987, his dissertation was published as the book Why Americans Don't Vote, by Greenwood Press. The book was well received and led to several writing assignments in Public Opinion Quarterly and The New Republic on the role of voter turnout in the 1988 election. The articles were widely cited as showing that increased voter turnout was not the solution to the Democrats' electoral woes—a hotly debated thesis at that time within the Democratic Party.

Teixeira left consulting after several years and took a government job at the Economic Research Service, where he studied labor market issues, chiefly the so-called skills mismatch between low-skilled and high-skilled workers. From there, he moved as a visiting fellow to the Brookings Institution, where in 1992, he published the book The Disappearing American Voter, focusing on voter turnout. Afterwards, he moved to the Progressive Policy Institute, the think tank of the Democratic Leadership Council, to start a political studies program. In 1994, Teixeira went to work at another think tank, the Economic Policy Institute, to direct their politics and public opinion program, and he stayed there until 1999.

In 1999, he moved to the Century Foundation's Washington office, where he is a senior fellow, and in 2003, he became a senior fellow of the newly formed Center for American Progress, headed by John Podesta, Chief of Staff to President Bill Clinton and co-chair of President Barack Obama's transition team.

Teixeira has also been a guest scholar at the Brookings Institution, where he co-directed a joint Brookings-American Enterprise Institute project on political demography and geography, "the Future of Red, Blue and, Purple America", and wrote a series of reports with William Frey on the political geography of battleground states in the 2008 election. In July 2022, he left the Center for American Progress, joining the American Enterprise Institute as a nonresident senior fellow focusing "on the transformation of the party coalitions and the future of American electoral politics".

Teixeira is the author or co-author of six books, including Red, Blue and Purple America: The Future of Election Demographics; The Emerging Democratic Majority; America's Forgotten Majority: Why the White Working Class Still Matters; and The Disappearing American Voter, as well as hundreds of articles, both scholarly and popular. He also writes Public Opinion Snapshot, a weekly feature on the CAP and TCF websites.

Teixeira's book The Emerging Democratic Majority, written with John Judis (Scribner, 2002), was the most widely discussed political book of that year and generated praise across the political spectrum, from George Will on the right to E.J. Dionne on the left. It was selected as one of the best books of the year by The Economist magazine.

Since 2020, Teixeira has written critically about a leftward shift within the Democratic Party. He has argued that the progressive movement in the United States is over and finished after the 2024 United States elections, positing that Democrats still do not realise it as of 2025. In 2026, he argued that the rise of the Democratic Socialists of America would further alienate the Democratic Party from the working class.

== See also ==
- The Emerging Republican Majority – 1969 book by Kevin Phillips
- Clintonism
- Third Way
