= John Judis =

American journalist

- Born: Chicago, Illinois, U.S.
- Education: Amherst College; University of California, Berkeley (BA, MA)
- Occupations: Journalist, author

John B. Judis is an author and American journalist, a contributing editor at Talking Points Memo, a former senior writer at the National Journal, and a former senior editor at The New Republic.

== Education ==
Judis was born in Chicago to a family of Jewish heritage. He attended Amherst College and received B.A. and M.A. degrees in Philosophy from the University of California at Berkeley.

== Career ==
Judis has been a lifelong democratic socialist. In 1986, while debating the Objectivist philosopher Harry Binswanger, a disciple of Ayn Rand, in a televised debate "Socialism vs. Capitalism", Judis laid out his version of socialism as being the inevitable socioeconomic arrangement of a post-capitalist society, where highly educated and industrialized societies would invariably transform into social democracies with mixed-market economies, personal property rights, and independent small and medium enterprises, with state intervention to regulate problems of capitalism and alleviate suffering, a view shared by many modern sociologists, including Wolfgang Streeck, as well as mid-20th century Progressives. This vision has defined all of Judis' work as an author, and is declared as prophetic by the author himself in his The Socialist Awakening, published in 2020.

In 1969, Judis was a founding editor of Socialist Revolution, which was later renamed Socialist Review and then Radical Society before ceasing publication in 2009. In the 1970s, he was a founding editor of the East Bay Voice. He moved to Chicago in December 1976 to become the foreign editor of In These Times, a democratic socialist newsweekly. Judis moved to Washington in 1982.

In 1984, he started writing for The New Republic. He became a contributing editor in 1989, and joined the regular staff in 1995. He quit in December 2014 along with other editors in protest of the owner Chris Hughes' firing of the editor and plan to turn the magazine into a profit-making vehicle. He has also written for GQ, Foreign Affairs, Mother Jones, The New York Times Magazine, and The Washington Post.

In 1988, Judis published a biography, William F. Buckley: Patron Saint of the Conservatives; in 1992, Grand Illusion: Critics and Champions of the American Century; and in 2000, The Paradox of American Democracy. In 2002, he published The Emerging Democratic Majority (co-written with political scientist Ruy Teixeira), a book arguing that Democrats would retake control of American politics by the end of the decade, thanks in part to growing support from minorities, women, and well-educated professionals. Its title was a deliberate echo of Kevin Phillips' 1969 classic, The Emerging Republican Majority. The book was named one of the year's best by The Economist.

In 2015, in an essay The Emerging Republican Advantage, he recanted his view and argued that the long term Democratic majority had given way to an "unstable equilibrium" between the parties. He wrote that the long term Democratic Majority was gone, as Hispanics and Asians were considerably less Democratic than he assumed and that white working class voters were abandoning the Democratic party.

In 2004, Judis published The Folly of Empire: What George W. Bush could learn from Theodore Roosevelt and Woodrow Wilson, an attempt to put the American invasion of Iraq in historical context. In 2014, he authored the book Genesis: Truman, American Jews, and the Origins of the Arab/Israeli Conflict in which he discussed the connection between the Israel lobby in the United States and the origin of the modern state of Israel.

In 2016, he published The Populist Explosion: How the Great Recession Transformed American and European Politics. This book, which was widely reviewed, analyzed, among other things, the remarkable success of Bernie Sanders and Donald Trump. In 2018, he published The Nationalist Revival: Trade, Immigration, and the Revolt against Globalization, which attempted to explain the rise of nationalist parties and candidates, including Trump. In September 2020, Judis published The Socialist Awakening. In 2021, he published "The Politics of Our Time: Populism, Nationalism, Socialism," in 2023, he published with Ruy Teixeira, "Where have all the Democrats Gone?"

== Bibliography ==
- William F. Buckley, Jr.: Patron Saint of the Conservatives. New York: Simon & Schuster. 1988. ISBN 0-7432-1797-7. OL 56928W.
- Grand Illusion: Critics and Champions of the American Century. New York: Farrar, Straus and Giroux. 1992. ISBN 9780374165949. OL 18016065W.
- The Paradox of American Democracy: Elites, Special Interests, and the Betrayal of the Public Trust. Pantheon Books. 2000. ISBN 0-679-43254-X.
- with Teixeira, Ruy (2002). The Emerging Democratic Majority. New York: Scribner. ISBN 9780743238557.
- The Folly of Empire : What George W. Bush Could Learn from Theodore Roosevelt and Woodrow Wilson. New York: Scribner. 2004. ISBN 0-7432-6127-5.
- Genesis: Truman, American Jews, and the Origins of the Arab/Israeli Conflict. New York: Farrar, Straus and Giroux. 2014. ISBN 9781429949101.
- The Populist Explosion: How the Great Recession Transformed American and European Politics. New York: Columbia Global Reports. 2016. ISBN 9780997126440. OL 20037476W.
- The Nationalist Revival: Trade, Immigration, and the Revolt against Globalization. New York: Columbia Global Reports. 2018. ISBN 9780999745403.
- The Socialist Awakening: What's Different Now about the Left. New York: Columbia Global Reports. 2020. ISBN 9781734420708.
- The Politics of Our Time: Populism, Nationalism, Socialism. New York: Columbia Global Reports. 2021. ISBN 9781735913605.
- Where Have all the Democrats gone? John B. Judis and Ruy Teixeira New York Henry Holt, 2023. ISBN 9781250877499.
