= United States presidential election summary since 1828 =

The following is a summary of United States presidential elections from 1828 to 2024.

Year	Democratic (Note: Northern Democrats 1860.)				Republican (Note: National Republican Party 1828–32; Whig Party 1836–1852; National Union Party 1864.)				Other				Total		Turn -out (Note: Turnout prior to 1960 is rounded to one decimal place.)	Majority (Note: Majority of winning candidate over second placed candidate in terms of electoral college votes. In 1860 the second placed candidate was not second placed in terms of popular votes.)	
Year	Popular Votes		EC Votes		Popular Votes		EC Votes		Popular Votes		EC Votes		Popular Votes	EC Votes	Turn -out	Popular Votes (Note: Negative numbers indicate winning candidate won absolute majority of electoral college votes but lost the popular vote.)	EC Votes
Year	No.	%	No.	%	No.	%	No.	%	No.	%	No.	%	Popular Votes	EC Votes	Turn -out	Popular Votes	EC Votes
2024	75,017,613	48.32%	226	42.01%	77,302,580	49.80%	312	57.99%	2,918,109	1.88%	0	0.00%	155,238,302	538	57.80%	2,284,967	86
2020	81,268,924	51.31%	306	56.88%	74,216,154	46.86%	232	43.12%	2,898,325	1.83%	0	0.00%	158,383,403	538	62.80%	7,052,770	74
2016	65,853,514	48.18%	227	42.19%	62,984,828	46.09%	304	56.51%	7,830,934	5.73%	7	1.30%	136,669,276	538	55.67%	-2,868,686	77
2012	65,915,795	51.06%	332	61.71%	60,933,504	47.20%	206	38.29%	2,236,111	1.73%	0	0.00%	129,085,410	538	54.87%	4,982,291	126
2008	69,498,516	52.93%	365	67.84%	59,948,323	45.65%	173	32.16%	1,866,981	1.42%	0	0.00%	131,313,820	538	58.23%	9,550,193	192
2004	59,028,444	48.27%	251	46.65%	62,040,610	50.73%	286	53.16%	1,226,291	1.00%	1	0.19%	122,295,345	538	56.70%	3,012,166	35
2000	50,999,897	48.38%	266	49.44%	50,456,002	47.87%	271	50.37%	3,949,201	3.75%	1	0.19%	105,405,100	538	51.21%	-543,895	5
1996	47,402,357	49.24%	379	70.45%	39,198,755	40.71%	159	29.55%	9,676,522	10.05%	0	0.00%	96,277,634	538	49.00%	8,203,602	220
1992	44,909,889	43.01%	370	68.77%	39,104,545	37.45%	168	31.23%	20,412,225	19.55%	0	0.00%	104,426,659	538	55.24%	5,805,344	202
1988	41,809,074	45.65%	111	20.63%	48,886,097	53.37%	426	79.18%	899,638	0.98%	1	0.19%	91,594,809	538	50.15%	7,077,023	315
1984	37,577,185	40.56%	13	2.42%	54,455,075	58.77%	525	97.58%	620,582	0.67%	0	0.00%	92,652,842	538	53.27%	16,877,890	512
1980	35,480,115	41.01%	49	9.11%	43,903,230	50.75%	489	90.89%	7,126,333	8.24%	0	0.00%	86,509,678	538	52.56%	8,423,115	440
1976	40,831,881	50.08%	297	55.20%	39,148,634	48.01%	240	44.61%	1,560,265	1.91%	1	0.19%	81,540,780	538	53.55%	1,683,247	57
1972	29,173,222	37.52%	17	3.16%	47,168,710	60.67%	520	96.65%	1,402,098	1.80%	1	0.19%	77,744,030	538	55.21%	17,995,488	503
1968	31,271,839	42.72%	191	35.50%	31,783,783	43.42%	301	55.95%	10,144,377	13.86%	46	8.55%	73,199,999	538	60.84%	511,944	110
1964	43,129,040	61.05%	486	90.33%	27,175,754	38.47%	52	9.67%	336,745	0.48%	0	0.00%	70,641,539	538	61.92%	15,953,286	434
1960	34,220,984	49.72%	303	56.42%	34,108,157	49.55%	219	40.78%	503,342	0.73%	15	2.79%	68,832,483	537	62.77%	112,827	84
1956	26,028,028	41.97%	73	13.75%	35,579,180	57.37%	457	86.06%	414,771	0.67%	1	0.19%	62,021,979	531	60.60%	9,551,152	384
1952	27,375,090	44.33%	89	16.76%	34,075,529	55.18%	442	83.24%	301,323	0.49%	0	0.00%	61,751,942	531	63.30%	6,700,439	353
1948	24,179,347	49.55%	303	57.06%	21,991,292	45.07%	189	35.59%	2,624,071	5.38%	39	7.34%	48,793,535	531	53.00%	2,188,055	114
1944	25,612,916	53.39%	432	81.36%	22,017,929	45.89%	99	18.64%	346,247	0.72%	0	0.00%	47,977,092	531	55.90%	3,594,987	333
1940	27,314,449	54.72%	449	84.56%	22,348,343	44.77%	82	15.44%	250,060	0.50%	0	0.00%	49,912,852	531	62.50%	4,966,106	367
1936	27,757,431	60.80%	523	98.49%	16,683,574	36.54%	8	1.51%	1,213,383	2.66%	0	0.00%	45,654,388	531	61.00%	11,073,857	515
1932	22,821,513	57.41%	472	88.89%	15,761,532	39.65%	59	11.11%	1,169,409	2.94%	0	0.00%	39,752,454	531	56.90%	7,059,981	413
1928	15,015,863	40.79%	87	16.38%	21,428,584	58.22%	444	83.62%	364,514	0.99%	0	0.00%	36,808,961	531	56.90%	6,412,721	357
1924	8,384,341	28.82%	136	25.61%	15,719,068	54.03%	382	71.94%	4,989,215	17.15%	13	2.45%	29,092,624	531	48.90%	7,334,727	246
1920	9,140,256	34.12%	127	23.92%	16,166,126	60.35%	404	76.08%	1,481,843	5.53%	0	0.00%	26,788,225	531	49.20%	7,025,870	277
1916	9,130,861	49.25%	277	52.17%	8,549,700	46.11%	254	47.83%	860,757	4.64%	0	0.00%	18,541,318	531	61.60%	581,161	23
1912	6,294,284	41.83%	435	81.92%	3,487,937	23.18%	8	1.51%	5,263,325	34.98%	88	16.57%	15,045,546	531	58.80%	2,173,675	347
1908	6,409,007	43.04%	162	33.54%	7,678,174	51.57%	321	66.46%	801,928	5.39%	0	0.00%	14,889,109	483	65.40%	1,269,167	159
1904	5,084,537	37.59%	140	29.41%	7,630,557	56.42%	336	70.59%	810,665	5.99%	0	0.00%	13,525,759	476	65.20%	2,546,020	196
1900	6,358,149	45.51%	155	34.68%	7,218,283	51.66%	292	65.32%	395,414	2.83%	0	0.00%	13,971,846	447	73.20%	860,134	137
1896	6,510,807	46.71%	176	39.37%	7,112,138	51.02%	271	60.63%	315,729	2.27%	0	0.00%	13,938,674	447	79.30%	601,331	95
1892	5,553,898	46.02%	277	62.39%	5,190,799	43.01%	145	32.66%	1,323,330	10.97%	22	4.95%	12,068,027	444	74.70%	363,099	132
1888	5,538,163	48.63%	168	41.90%	5,443,633	47.80%	233	58.10%	407,050	3.57%	0	0.00%	11,388,846	401	79.40%	-94,530	65
1884	4,914,482	48.85%	219	54.61%	4,856,903	48.28%	182	45.39%	288,760	2.87%	0	0.00%	10,060,145	401	77.50%	57,579	37
1880	4,444,267	48.22%	155	42.01%	4,453,337	48.31%	214	57.99%	319,806	3.47%	0	0.00%	9,217,410	369	78.00%	9,070	59
1876	4,286,808	50.92%	184	49.86%	4,034,142	47.92%	185	50.14%	97,709	1.16%	0	0.00%	8,418,659	369	81.80%	-252,666	1
1872 (Note: At the 1872 election the Democratic Party did not field its own candidate but instead supported Liberal Republican Party candidate Horace Greeley.)	0	0.00%	0	0.00%	3,597,439	55.58%	286	81.25%	2,874,544	44.42%	66	18.75%	6,471,983	352	71.30%	763,729	220
1868	2,708,980	47.34%	80	27.21%	3,013,790	52.66%	214	72.79%	46	0.00%	0	0.00%	5,722,816	294	78.10%	304,810	134
1864	1,806,227	44.95%	21	9.01%	2,211,317	55.03%	212	90.99%	658	0.02%	0	0.00%	4,018,202	233	73.80%	405,090	191
1860	1,381,944	29.52%	12	3.96%	1,855,993	39.65%	180	59.41%	1,443,330	30.83%	111	36.63%	4,681,267	303	81.20%	1,004,149	108
1856	1,835,140	45.29%	174	58.78%	1,340,668	33.09%	114	38.51%	875,797	21.62%	8	2.70%	4,051,605	296	78.90%	494,472	60
1852	1,605,943	50.83%	254	85.81%	1,386,418	43.88%	42	14.19%	167,279	5.29%	0	0.00%	3,159,640	296	69.60%	219,525	212
1848	1,222,353	42.49%	127	43.79%	1,360,235	47.28%	163	56.21%	294,230	10.23%	0	0.00%	2,876,818	290	72.70%	137,882	36
1844	1,339,570	49.54%	170	61.82%	1,300,157	48.09%	105	38.18%	64,137	2.37%	0	0.00%	2,703,864	275	78.90%	39,413	65
1840	1,129,645	46.82%	60	20.41%	1,275,583	52.87%	234	79.59%	7,466	0.31%	0	0.00%	2,412,694	294	80.20%	145,938	174
1836 (Note: At the 1836 election the Whig Party fielded four candidates - only the leading candidate's (William Henry Harrison) votes are included in the "Republican" columns, the other three Whig candidates votes are included under "Other".)	763,291	50.79%	170	57.82%	549,907	36.59%	73	24.83%	189,613	12.62%	51	17.35%	1,502,811	294	57.80%	213,384	97
1832	702,735	54.74%	219	76.57%	474,107	36.93%	49	17.13%	106,878	8.33%	18	6.29%	1,283,720	286	55.40%	228,628	170
1828	642,806	55.93%	178	68.20%	501,967	43.68%	83	31.80%	4,443	0.39%	0	0.00%	1,149,216	261	57.60%	140,839	95
