= Seventh Party System =

Proposed political era in the U.S.

- 2016–present
- United States presidential election results between 2016 and 2024. Blue shaded states usually voted for the Democratic Party, while red shaded states usually voted for the Republican Party. (Note: The circles represent Maine and Nebraska's second congressional districts.)

The Seventh Party System is a proposed era of American politics that began sometime around the 2010s or 2020s. Its periodization, alongside the Sixth Party System, is heavily debated due to the lack of an overwhelming change of hands in Congress since the end of the Fifth Party System.

== Definition ==
The beginning date of the Seventh Party system usually is considered to be 2016.

Political scientists Mark D. Brewer and L. Sandy Maisel wrote in 2020, "In the wake of Donald Trump's 2016 presidential victory, there is now strengthening debate as to whether [the United States is] entering a new party system as Trump fundamentally reshapes the Republican Party and the Democratic Party responds and evolves as well."

Donald Trump's 2024 re-election has led to significant speculation and discussions about a potential political realignment due to shifts in voter demographics. Trump's victories in all swing states, dominance with White working-class voters, and historic Republican gains with Hispanics, Blacks, and Asians have produced conversations on the emergence of the Seventh Party system in the American landscape. For example, in Florida's Miami-Dade County, Trump significantly improved his margins among Hispanic voters in 2020 compared to 2016.

In Texas's Rio Grande Valley, Republicans increased their support among predominantly Latino counties and Zapata County (population less than 15,000) was the only county in South Texas that flipped red for the first time in a hundred years, and exit polls nationwide indicated increases in Trump's support among Hispanic voters during the 2020 presidential election. Stating in 2025 that "'The Age of Trump' Enters Its Second Decade", Peter Baker of The New York Times wrote "In those 10 years, Mr. Trump has come to define his age in a way rarely seen in America, more so than any president of the past century other than Franklin D. Roosevelt and Ronald Reagan".

== Characteristics ==
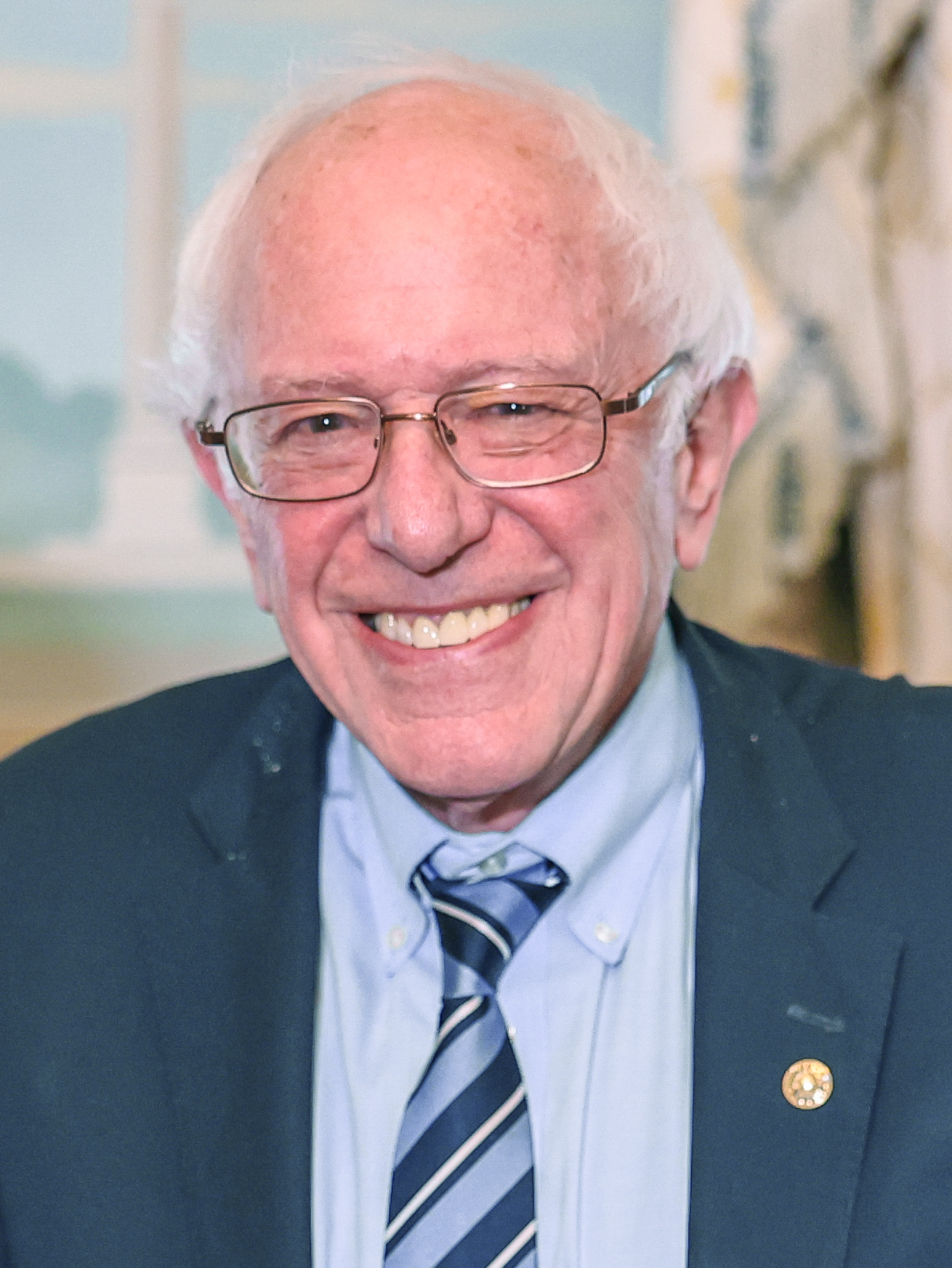
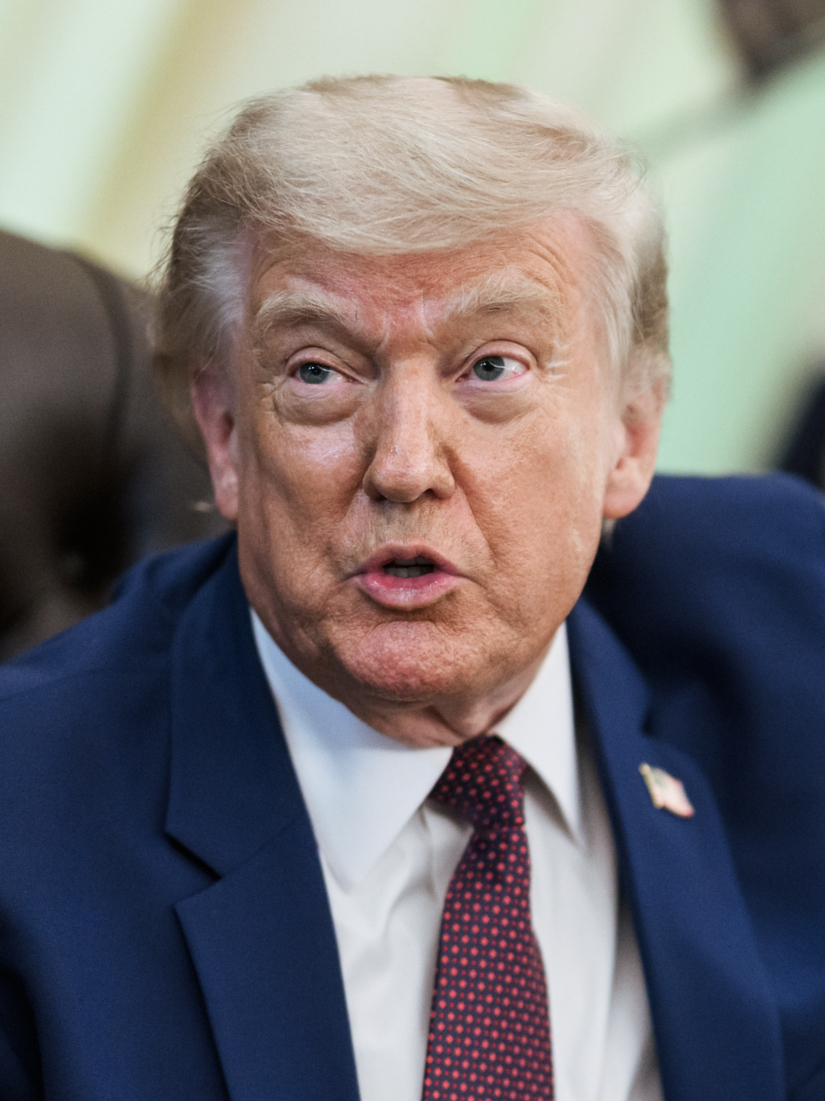
This Party system is highly associated with the presidencies of Donald Trump (right), as well as populism following the 2016 Democratic primary between Bernie Sanders (left) and Hillary Clinton (not pictured).

Proponents of the shift to the Seventh Party System point to several recent demographic and voting pattern changes. Non-White voters, historically Democratic-leaning, have grown as a share of the population since the start of the Sixth Party System, and previously Republican-leaning secular college-educated White voters have moved leftward. At the same time, Republicans have made significant inroads with White voters without a college degree, while maintaining their favor with evangelical Christian voters.

The Seventh Party System has generally featured very close elections, with neither party being able to maintain a lasting, structural majority in federal government. The Seventh Party System has seen high institutional conflict as well as high legislative dysfunction due to intense factionalism and the rise of presidents who serve as divisive rather than unifying figures. The Seventh Party System has seen high affective polarization with voters being highly motivated by a deep dislike of the opposing party rather than just support for their own. Despite the high amount of partisan voting under the Seventh Party System, there is a growth in voters identifying as independents, though most lean strongly towards one party.

Social media has been a prominent communications medium during the system.

=== Issues ===
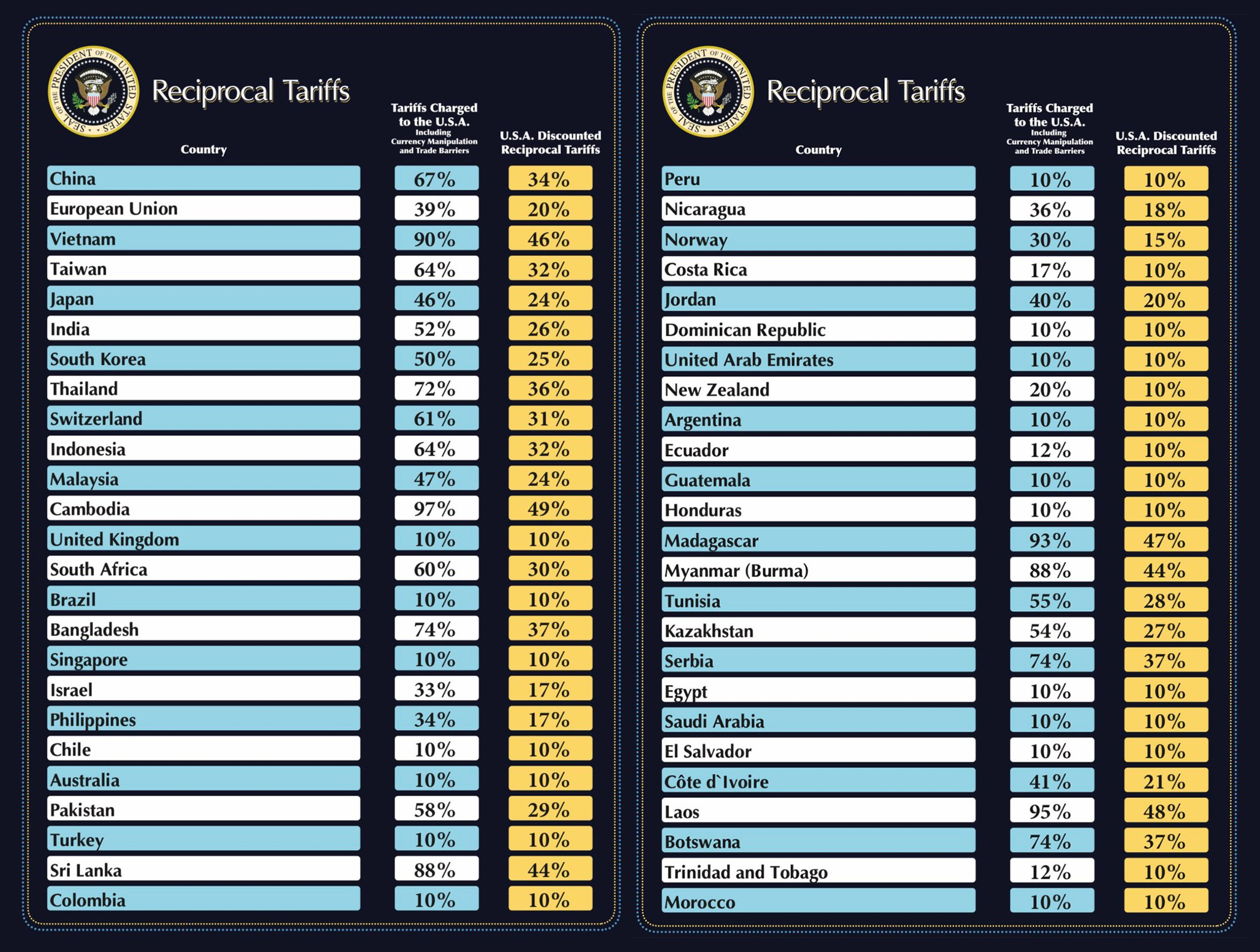
Liberation Day tariffs in 2025

The Republican Party has also made a decisive shift away from free trade to advocating for protectionism, a historic Republican position that Trump has since revived. Trump cited President William McKinley as a political hero, noting his McKinley Tariff as a blueprint for protectionist industrial policy. As of August 2025, the United States currently has the highest effective tariff rate since 1935. This shift has increasingly compelled the rival Democratic Party to adopt a more positive stance towards free trade, replicating the divide of the Fourth Party System of the late 19th and early 20th centuries on trade policy.

By the 2010s, the Cold War had lost much of its relevance, dividing the parties on nationalist and internationalist lines on foreign policy. The US also lost its brief unipolar status as China grew.

== See also ==
- History of the Democratic Party (United States)
- History of the Republican Party (United States)
- Party systems in the United States
- Political party strength in U.S. states
- Populism in the United States
