= List of United States House of Representatives elections (1856–present) =

This provides a summary of the results of elections to the United States House of Representatives from the elections held in 1856 to the present. This time period corresponds to the Third, Fourth, Fifth and Sixth Party Systems of the United States. For the purposes of counting partisan divisions in the U.S. House of Representatives, "Independent Democrats", "Independent Republicans", and other members loosely affiliated with the two main parties have been included in the "Democrat" and "Republican" member tallies in the table below, though the details of such are included in the accompanying 'Notes'. Parties with a majority, or which controlled the U.S. House of Representatives after the election, are shown in bold.

Summary of the 1856–present United States House of Representatives elections
Election year	Democrats		Republicans		Other parties			Total apportionment
Election year	Seats	Change	Seats	Change	Populist	Independents	Others	Total apportionment
1856	**133** (Note: Includes one Independent Democrat.)	+50	90	–10 (Note: Compared to the number of seats for "Opposition Party" in the 34th United States Congress.)	–	–	14 (Note: Fourteen members of the American Party (Know Nothing).)	237
1858	98 (Note: Includes eight Anti-Lecompton Democrats and seven Independent Democrats.)	–35	**116**	+26	–	–	24 (Note: Includes nineteen "Opposition" members, and five members of the American Party (Know Nothing).)	238
1860	45	–53 (Note: Much of this loss is due to the secession of the Confederate States of America.)	**108**	–8	–	–	30 (Note: Includes various factions of Constitutional Unionists.)	183
1862	72	+27	**87** (Note: Includes two Independent Republicans.)	–21	–	–	25	184
1864	38	–34	**137** (Note: Includes one Independent Republican.)	+50	–	–	18	193
1866	47	+9	**175** (Note: Includes one Independent Republican and one conservative Republican.)	+38	–	–	4 (Note: Includes two Conservative members, and also two vacant U.S. House districts.)	226
1868	67	+20	**171**	–4	–	–	5 (Note: Includes five Conservative members.)	243
1870	104	+37	**139** (Note: Includes two Liberal Republicans and one Independent Republican.)	–32	–	–	–	243
1872	89	–15	**203** (Note: Includes four Liberal Republicans.)	+44	–	–	–	292
1874	**183**	+94	106 (Note: Includes three Independent Republicans.)	–97	–	4	–	293
1876	**157** (Note: Includes two Independent Democrats.)	–26	136	+30	–	–	–	293
1878	**148** (Note: Includes seven Independent Democrats.)	–9	132	–4	–	–	13 (Note: Includes thirteen members of the National Independent (Greenback) Party.)	293
1880	131 (Note: Includes two Readjuster Democrats and one Independent Democrat.)	–17	**151**	+19	–	1	10 (Note: Includes ten members of the National Independent (Greenback) Party.)	293
1882	**199** (Note: Includes three Independent Democrats.)	+68	118	–33	–	2	6 (Note: Includes four members of the Readjuster Party, two members of the National Independent (Greenback) Party.)	325
1884	**183**	–16	141	+23	–	–	1 (Note: One National Independent (Greenback) Party member.)	325
1886	**167**	–16	154	+13	–	1	3 (Note: Includes two members of the Labor Party, one member of the National Independent (Greenback) Party.)	325
1888	152	–15	**179**	+25	–	–	1 (Note: One Labor Party member.)	332
1890	**238**	+86	86	–93	8	–	–	332
1892	**220**	–18	124	+38	11	–	1 (Note: Includes one Silver Party member.)	356
1894	93	–127	**254**	+130	9	–	1	357
1896	124	+31	**210** (Note: Includes three Silver Republican Party members (a GOP splinter group), and one Independent Republican.)	–44	22	–	1	357
1898	161	+37	**189** (Note: Includes two Silver Republican Party members (a GOP splinter group).)	–21	6 (Note: Includes one Independent Populist.)	–	1	357
1900	151	–10	**201** (Note: Includes one Silver Republican Party member.)	+12	5	–	–	357
1902	176	+25	**210**	+9	–	–	–	386
1904	135	–41	**251**	+41	–	–	–	386
1906	167	+32	**224**	–27	–	–	–	391
1908	172	+5	**219**	–5	–	–	–	391
1910	**230**	+58	163 (Note: Includes one Progressive Republican member.)	–56	–	–	1 (Note: Includes one Socialist member.)	394
1912	**291**	+61	134	–29	–	1	9 (Note: Includes nine Progressive Party members.)	435
1914	**230**	–61	196	+62	–	1	8 (Note: Includes six Progressive Party members, one Socialist member, and one Prohibition Party member.)	435
1916	**214** (Note: Democrats maintained control of the U.S. House after the 1916 elections by forming a 218-member coalition with the three Progressive members and the one Socialist member.)	–16	216	+20	–	–	5 (Note: Includes three Progressive Party members, one Socialist member, and one Prohibition Party member.)	435
1918	192	–22	**240**	+24	–	1	2 (Note: Includes one Union-Labor member, and one Prohibition Party member.)	435
1920	131	–61	**303**	+63	–	–	1	435
1922	207	+76	**225**	–78	–	–	3 (Note: Includes two Farmer–Labor Party members and one Socialist Party member.)	435
1924	183	–24	**247**	+22	–	–	5 (Note: Includes three Farmer–Labor Party members, one American-Labor member, and one Socialist Party member.)	435
1926	194	+11	**238**	–9	–	–	3	435
1928	164	–30	**270**	+32	–	–	1 (Note: Includes one Farmer–Labor Party member.)	435
1930	**216** (Note: Before the 72nd United States Congress convened for its first day, 14 representatives-elect died, and the results of the intervening special elections caused party control of the House to change, and Democrats organized with the majority of an initial majority 218 House seats.)	+52	218	–52	–	–	1	435
1932	**313**	+97	117	–101	–	–	5 (Note: Includes five Farmer–Labor Party members.)	435
1934	**322**	+9	103	–14	–	–	10 (Note: Includes three Farmer–Labor Party members, and seven Wisconsin Progressive Party members.)	435
1936	**334**	+12	88	–15	–	–	13 (Note: Includes five Farmer–Labor Party members, and seven Wisconsin Progressive Party and on California Progressive Party members.)	435
1938	**262**	–72	169	+81	–	–	4 (Note: Includes one Farmer–Labor Party member, one American Labor Party member, and two Wisconsin Progressive Party members.)	435
1940	**268**	+6	162	–7	–	–	5 (Note: Includes one Farmer–Labor Party member, one American Labor Party member, and three Wisconsin Progressive Party members.)	435
1942	**222**	–46	209	+47	–	–	4	435
1944	**244**	+22	189	–20	–	–	2 (Note: Includes one American Labor Party member and one Wisconsin Progressive Party member.)	435
1946	188	–56	**246**	+57	–	–	1 (Note: Includes one American Labor Party member.)	435
1948	**263**	+75	171	–75	–	–	1	435
1950	**235**	–28	199	+28	–	1	–	435
1952	213	–22	**221**	+22	–	1	–	435
1954	**232**	+19	203	–18	–	–	–	435
1956	**232**	0	203	0	–	–	–	435
1958	**283**	+51	153	–50	–	–	–	436 (Note: Alaska was admitted as a state and entered Congress at the beginning of the 86th Congress.)
1960	**264**	–19	173	+20	–	–	–	437 (Note: Hawaii was admitted as a state and entered Congress on August 21, 1959 during the preceding 86th Congress.)
1962	**259**	–5	176	+3	–	–	–	435
1964	**295**	+36	140	–36	–	–	–	435
1966	**248**	–47	187	+47	–	–	–	435
1968	**243**	–5	192	+5	–	–	–	435
1970	**255**	+12	180	–12	–	–	–	435
1972	**243**	–12	192	+12	–	–	–	435
1974	**291**	+48	144	–48	–	–	–	435
1976	**292**	+1	143	–1	–	–	–	435
1978	**277**	–15	158	+15	–	–	–	435
1980	**243**	–34	192	+34	–	–	–	435
1982	**269**	+26	166	–26	–	–	–	435
1984	**253**	–16	182	+16	–	–	–	435
1986	**258**	+5	177	–5	–	–	–	435
1988	**260**	+2	175	–2	–	–	–	435
1990	**267**	+7	167	–8	–	1	–	435
1992	**258**	–9	176	+9	–	1	–	435
1994	204	–54	**230**	+54	–	1	–	435
1996	206	+2	**228**	–2	–	1	–	435
1998	211	+5	**223**	–5	–	1	–	435
2000	212	+1	**221**	–2	–	2	–	435
2002	205	–7	**229**	+8	–	1	–	435
2004	202	–3	**232**	+3	–	1	–	435
2006	**233**	+31	202	–30	–	–	–	435
2008	**257**	+24	178	–24	–	–	–	435
2010	193	–63	**242**	+63	–	–	–	435
2012	201	+8	**234**	–8	–	–	–	435
2014	188	–13	**247**	+13	–	–	–	435
2016	194	+6	**241**	–6	–	–	–	435
2018	**235**	+41	199	–42	–	–	1 (Note: Results from North Carolina's 9th congressional district were voided, leading to a September 2019 special election.)	435
2020	**222**	–13	213 (Note: Includes the results of the election for NY-22 which were not certified until February 5, 2021 after a judicial review of the election results.)	+14	–	–	–	435
2022	213	–9	**222**	+9	–	–	–	435
2024	215	+2	**220**	–2	–	–	–	435
2026					–	–	–	435

Republican Party won a majority. Democratic Party won a majority.

== See also ==
- List of United States House of Representatives elections (1789–1822)
- List of United States House of Representatives elections (1824–1854)
- Third Party System
- Fourth Party System
- Fifth Party System
- Sixth Party System

== Bibliography ==
- Dubin, Michael J. (March 1, 1998). United States Congressional Elections, 1788-1997: The Official Results of the Elections of the 1st Through 105th Congresses. McFarland and Company. ISBN 978-0786402830.
- Martis, Kenneth C. (January 1, 1989). The Historical Atlas of Political Parties in the United States Congress, 1789-1989. Macmillan Publishing Company. ISBN 978-0029201701.
- Moore, John L., ed. (1994). Congressional Quarterly's Guide to U.S. Elections (Third ed.). Congressional Quarterly Inc. ISBN 978-0871879967.
- "Party Divisions of the House of Representatives* 1789–Present". Office of the Historian, United States House of Representatives.
