= Kristina Miler =

Political scientist

- Title: Professor of Political Science

Academic background
- Education: College of William and Mary (B.A.); University of Michigan (PhD)

Academic work
- Discipline: Political scientist
- Sub-discipline: American government and politics
- Institutions: University of Maryland

Kristina C. Miler is a political scientist specializing in American government, social movements, legislative politics, and the role of interest groups in politics. She is Professor of Political Science at the University of Maryland and Director of Graduate Studies at its Department of Government and Politics.

== Education ==
Miler obtained a B.A. from the College of William and Mary and a PhD from the University of Michigan.

== Career ==
After an assistant professorship at University of Illinois at Urbana-Champaign, Miler took up the posts of Assistant, Associate, and then Professor in the Department of Government and Politics at the University of Maryland. She currently also serves as the Department's Director of Graduate Studies. Moreover, she is an affiliate scholar in the Center for Effective Lawmaking at the University of Virginia.

== Research ==
Miler is an expert in U.S. politics, political respresentation, and legislative politics, especially in the U.S. Congress. Her first book, Constituency Representation in Congress: The View from Capitol Hill, was published in 2010 by Cambridge University Press. It was awarded the Woodrow Wilson Foundation Award by the American Political Science Association (APSA), which honours "the best book on government, politics, or international affairs" in any given year.

== Publications ==
=== Books ===
- Miler, Kristina C. (2010). Constituency Representation in Congress: The View from Capitol Hill. Cambridge University Press. doi:10.1017/CBO9780511779404. ISBN 978-0-521-76540-4.
- Poor Representation: Congress and the Politics of Poverty in the United States. Cambridge University Press. 2018.

=== Selected articles ===
- Miler, Kristina C. (2007). "The View from the Hill: Legislative Perceptions Of the District". Legislative Studies Quarterly. 32 (4): 597–628. doi:10.3162/036298007782398477. ISSN 1939-9162.
- Hall, Richard L.; Miler, Kristina C. (October 2008). "What Happens After the Alarm? Interest Group Subsidies to Legislative Overseers". The Journal of Politics. 70 (4): 990–1005. doi:10.1017/S0022381608081012. ISSN 0022-3816.
- Miler, Kristina C. (2009). "The Limitations of Heuristics for Political Elites". Political Psychology. 30 (6): 863–894. doi:10.1111/j.1467-9221.2009.00731.x. ISSN 1467-9221.
- Miler, Kristina C. (2011-09-01). "The Constituency Motivations of Caucus Membership". American Politics Research. 39 (5): 885–920. doi:10.1177/1532673X11407148. ISSN 1532-673X.
- Miler, Kristina (2016-09-01). "Legislative Responsiveness to Constituency Change". American Politics Research. 44 (5): 816–843. doi:10.1177/1532673X15620838. ISSN 1532-673X.
- Miler, Kristina (2017-09-01). "How Committees Shape Legislative Behavior: An Examination of Interests and Institutions". American Politics Research. 45 (5): 813–839. doi:10.1177/1532673X17709266. ISSN 1532-673X.
- Hunt, Charles R.; Miler, Kristina C. (January 2025). "How Modern Lawmakers Advertise Their Legislative Effectiveness to Constituents". The Journal of Politics. 87 (1): 231–245. doi:10.1086/730732. ISSN 0022-3816.

== Awards ==
- Woodrow Wilson Foundation Award, American Political Science Association (APSA)
- Alan Rosenthal Prize, American Political Science Association (APSA)
