= List of United States House of Representatives elections (1789–1822) =

This provides a summary of the results of elections to the United States House of Representatives from the first election held variably in 1788 or 1789 (different states held elections at different times) to 1822. This time period corresponds to the First Party System of the United States. For more detailed results of each election, see the main page for that election. Information about the popular vote in early elections is not available as records of the popular vote were not kept. Parties with a majority in the House of Representatives are shown in bold.

Summary of the 1789–1822 United States House of Representatives elections
Election year	Federalists (Note: The Federalist Party did not have any formal organization until 1794 and was before then referred to as "Pro-Administration".)		Democrat-Republicans (Note: Variously referred to as the Republicans, Jeffersonian Republicans and Democratic-Republicans, this party is not to be confused with the modern Republican Party and is in fact a forerunner of the modern Democratic Party. Like the Federalist Party, the Democratic-Republican Party had no formal organization until 1794 and was before then referred to as "Anti-Administration".)		Total apportionment
Election year	Seats	Change	Seats	Change	Total apportionment
1789	**37**	–	28	–	65
1790	**39**	+2	30 (Note: Includes late elections.)	+2	69
1792	51	+12	**54**	+24	106
1794	47	–4	**59**	+5	106
1796	**57**	+10	49	–10	106
1798	**60**	+3	46	–3	106
1800	38	–22	**68**	+22	106
1802	39	+1	**103**	+35	142
1804	28	–11	**114**	+11	142
1806	26	–2	**116**	+2	142
1808	48 (Note: Figures for 1808 match Dubin (p. 42, which includes "87 Republicans, 1 Independent Republican, and 6 Quids", in addition to "48 Federalists"), but are different than those given by Martis (p. 80), and "Party Divisions of the House of Representatives* 1789–Present". Office of the Historian, House of United States House of Representatives., which both report 92 Democrat-Republicans, and 50 Federalists.)	+22	**94**	–22	142
1810	36	–12	**107**	+13	143
1812	68	+32	**114**	+7	182
1814	64	–4	**119**	+5	183
1816/17	40 (Note: Figures are at variance with both Dubin (p. 62, which includes "140 Republicans, 1 Independent Republican, and 2 vacancies", in addition to "41 Federalists"), and Martis (p. 84) and "Party Divisions of the House of Representatives* 1789–Present". Office of the Historian, House of United States House of Representatives. (which both report 146 Democrat-Republicans, and 39 Federalists). But Dubin appears to incorrectly list Lewis Williams of NC-13 as a "Federalist" (see pg. 60 and 55, etc.) instead of a "Democrat-Republican", while Martis lists Philemon Beecher of OH-05 as a "Democrat-Republican" instead of a "Federalist", which if accounted for would revise both Dubin's and Martis' totals to 40 Federalists (and therefore 145 Democrat-Republicans).)	–24	**145**	+26	185
1818	26	–14	**160**	+15	186
1820	32	+6	**155**	–5	187
1822	24 (Note: Corresponds to the sum of Adams-Clay Federalists (15), Jackson Federalists (7), and Crawford Federalists (2).)	–8	**189** (Note: Corresponds to the sum of Adams-Clay Republicans (72), Jackson Republicans (64), and Crawford Republicans (53).)	+34	213

== See also ==
- List of United States House of Representatives elections (1824–1854)
- List of United States House of Representatives elections (1856–present)
- First Party System

== Bibliography ==
- Dubin, Michael J. (March 1, 1998). United States Congressional Elections, 1788-1997: The Official Results of the Elections of the 1st Through 105th Congresses. McFarland and Company. ISBN 978-0786402830.
- Martis, Kenneth C. (January 1, 1989). The Historical Atlas of Political Parties in the United States Congress, 1789-1989. Macmillan Publishing Company. ISBN 978-0029201701.
- "Party Divisions of the House of Representatives* 1789–Present". Office of the Historian, United States House of Representatives.
