= Costas Panagopoulos =

American political scientist

- Education: Harvard University A.B., 1994; New York University Ph.D., 2005
- Scientific career
- Fields: Political Science
- Workplaces: Fordham University, Northeastern University

Costas Panagopoulos is an American professor of political science at Northeastern University in Boston who studies political campaigns and elections.

He earned his undergraduate degree in government at Harvard in 1994, and then a masters followed by a PhD from New York University in politics in 2005.

In 1992 while he was a student at Harvard he ran as a Republican candidate for a seat in the Massachusetts State Legislature and lost.

After graduating from Harvard he worked as a research assistant at Harvard, then for the French Ministry of Social Affairs, then for a public relations firm, Burson-Marsteller, then as an editor for politics at Adweek, and started a consulting firm called XVOTE. In 2000 he took a position running the MA program in political campaigns at NYU, and earned his graduate degrees at NYU while doing that job.

While he was at NYU he worked for a year as an APSA Congressional Fellow for Senator Hillary Clinton.

After graduating from NYU in 2005 he took a position running the graduate program in elections and campaign management at Fordham and had an appointment as a visiting assistant professor; that same year he also took a one year job as a post doc at the Institution for Social and Policy Studies at Yale University, and then had an appointment there as a researcher for a year. In 2007 he was appointed an assistant professor in political science at Fordham and was appointed to a tenure-track associate professorship there in 2011. In 2008 he had founded and become director of the Center for Electoral Politics and Democracy at Fordham. He was appointed professor of political science at Northeastern University in Boston in 2017.

He is the editor-in-chief of American Politics Research and has been a member of the decision desk team at NBC since 2006.

Selected books

- Panagopoulos, C. (Ed.). (2012). Strategy, Money and Technology in the 2008 Presidential Election. Taylor and Francis. ISBN 978-0415669429.
- Panagopoulos, C. (Ed.). (2011). Public financing in American elections. Temple University Press. ISBN 978-1-43990-693-4.
- Panagopoulos, C. (Ed.). (2009). Politicking online: The transformation of election campaign communications. Rutgers University Press. ISBN 978-0-8135-4488-5.
- Panagopoulos, C. (Ed.). (2007). Rewiring politics: presidential nominating conventions in the media age. LSU Press. ISBN 978-0807132067.

Selected papers

- Panagopoulos, C. (2006). "The polls-trends Arab and Muslim Americans and Islam in the aftermath of 9/11". Public Opinion Quarterly. 70 (4): 608–624. doi:10.1093/poq/nfl029.
- Panagopoulos, C.; Green, D. (2008). "Field experiments testing the impact of radio advertisements on electoral competition". American Journal of Political Science. 52 (1): 156–168. doi:10.1111/j.1540-5907.2007.00305.x.
- Panagopoulos, C. (2010). "Affect, social pressure and prosocial motivation: Field experimental evidence of the mobilizing effects of pride, shame and publicizing voting behavior". Political Behavior. 32 (2): 369–386. doi:10.1007/s11109-010-9114-0.
- Panagopoulos, C. (2013). "Positive Social Pressure and Prosocial Motivation: Evidence from a Large‐Scale Field Experiment on Voter Mobilization". Political Psychology. 34 (2): 265–275. doi:10.1111/pops.12007.
- Panagopoulos, C. (2014). "I've Got My Eyes on You: Implicit Social‐Pressure Cues and Prosocial Behavior". Political Psychology. 35 (1): 23–33. doi:10.1111/pops.12074.
