= List of United States House of Representatives elections (1824–1854) =

The table below summarizes results of elections to the United States House of Representatives from 1824 to 1854, a period corresponding to the Second Party System. In the House of Representatives, "Independent Democrats" and "Independent Whigs" are counted with the Democrats and the Whigs, respectively, and as described in the accompanying 'Note'. For more detailed results, see the main page for that election. Parties with a House majority or a plurality are shown in bold.

Summary of the 1824–1854 United States House of Representatives elections
Election year	Democrats (Note: The successor to the Democratic-Republican Party, they were initially called Jacksonians, before becoming the modern Democratic Party after 1828.)		Whigs (Note: Initially called "Adams Men" as supporters of John Quincy Adams, they would later become known as the National Republican Party, before becoming the Whig Party in the 1830s.)		Other Parties				Total apportionment
Election year	Seats	Change	Seats	Change	Anti-Masonic	American (Note: More commonly known as the Know Nothing movement rather than the American Party.)	Independents	Others	Total apportionment
1824	104	+33 (Note: The Jacksonians and Anti-Jacksonians were two factions of the Democratic-Republican Party that parted ways in 1824. Each Democratic-Republican member of Congress chose an allegiance before the 1824 election was held, so changes only indicate seats gained by each faction during that election. In the case of the Jacksonians, there were 64 "Jackson" Democrat-Republicans and 7 "Jackson" Federalists, for a total of 71 Jacksonians, in the U.S. House before the 1824 election.)	**109**	+22 (Note: The Jacksonians and Anti-Jacksonians were two factions of the Democratic-Republican Party that parted ways in 1824. Each Democratic-Republican member of Congress chose an allegiance before the 1824 election was held, so changes only indicate seats gained by each faction during that election. In the case of the Anti-Jacksonians (aka. Adams Men), there were 72 "Adams-Clay" Democrat-Republicans and 15 "Adams-Clay" Federalists, for a total of 87 Anti-Jacksonians, in the U.S. House before the 1824 election.)	–	–	–	–	213
1826	**113**	+9	100	–9	–	–	–	–	213
1828	**136**	+23	72	–28	5	–	–	–	213
1830	**126**	–10	66	–6	17	–	–	4 (Note: Nullifiers: The Nullifiers had no formal party organization.)	213
1832	**143**	+17	63	–3	25	–	–	9	240
1834	**143** (Note: Includes late elections.)	0	75	+12	16	–	–	8	242
1836	**128**	–15	100	+25	7	–	1	6	242
1838	**125**	–3	109	+9	6	–	–	2 (Note: Two members of the Conservative Party from Virginia.)	242
1840	99 (Note: Includes one Independent Democrat.)	–26	**142**	+33	–	–	1	–	242
1842	**148**	+49	73 (Note: Includes one Independent Whig.)	–69	–	–	–	2 (Note: Two Law and Order Party members from Rhode Island.)	223
1844	**142**	–6	79	+6	–	6	–	–	228
1846	112 (Note: Includes two Independent Democrats.)	–30	**116**	+37	–	1	1	–	230
1848	**113**	+1	108	–8	–	1	1	9 (Note: Nine members of the Free Soil Party.)	233
1850	**130** (Note: Includes three Independent Democrats from Ohio, Tennessee, and Wisconsin.)	+17	86	–22	–	–	–	17 (Note: Ten members of the Constitutional Union Party, four members of the Free Soil Party, and three members of the States' Rights Party.)	233
1852	**158**	+28	71	–15	–	–	1	4 (Note: Four members of the Free Soil Party.)	234
1854	83	–75	**100** (Note: With the Whig Party collapsing and the Republican Party not yet fully organized, the plurality in the 34th Congress coalesced as the transitional Opposition Party, comprising 54 Whigs, 22 Anti-Nebraska, 13 Republicans, 9 People's Party, 1 Free Soil, and 1 Independent. To form a majority, the Opposition Party coalesced with the American Party (Know Nothing).)	+29	–	51	– (Note: In 1854, there was one Independent member, but the Independent is included with the Opposition Party's figures.)	–	234

== See also ==
- List of United States House of Representatives elections (1789–1822)
- List of United States House of Representatives elections (1856–present)
- Second Party System

== Bibliography ==
- Dubin, Michael J. (March 1, 1998). United States Congressional Elections, 1788-1997: The Official Results of the Elections of the 1st Through 105th Congresses. McFarland and Company. ISBN 978-0786402830.
- Martis, Kenneth C. (January 1, 1989). The Historical Atlas of Political Parties in the United States Congress, 1789-1989. Macmillan Publishing Company. ISBN 978-0029201701.
- Moore, John L., ed. (1994). Congressional Quarterly's Guide to U.S. Elections (Third ed.). Congressional Quarterly Inc. ISBN 978-0871879967.
- "Party Divisions of the House of Representatives* 1789–Present". Office of the Historian, United States House of Representatives.
