= Fifth Party System =

Phase in U.S. electoral politics (1932–1976)

- 1932–1980
- United States presidential election results between 1932 and 1976. Blue shaded states usually voted for the Democratic Party, while red shaded states usually voted for the Republican Party.

The Fifth Party System, also known as the New Deal Party System, is the era of American national politics that began with the election of Franklin D. Roosevelt as President of the United States in 1932. Roosevelt's implementation of his popular New Deal expanded the size and power of the federal government to an extent unprecedented in American history, and marked the beginning of political dominance by the Democratic Party that would remain largely unbroken until 1952. This period also began the ideological swapping of Democrats and Republicans into their modern versions. This was largely due to traditionally Republican Black voters switching to the Democratic Party, while conservative, ethnic whites, and southern Democrats shifted to the Republican Party. This occurred as Democrats began increasingly prioritizing civil rights, a process that accelerated into the 1960s. The Fifth Party System followed the Fourth Party System, also known as the Progressive Era, and was succeeded by the Sixth Party System.

The New Deal coalition that cemented the Fifth Party System and allowed Democrats to dominate the White House for 40-some years arose from the realignment of two similar third party factions into the Democratic Party: the Progressives in the Western Coast and the greater Rust Belt region (which includes New York, Massachusetts, Baltimore and New Jersey), and the Socialists in the Western Coast and Sun Belt. Realigning these two factions after the 1932 and 1936 elections allowed the Democratic Party to make inroads in the North for the first time since the Second Party System and made other non-South regions competitive.

== History ==
The onset of the Great Depression undermined the confidence of business in Republican promises of prosperity. The four consecutive elections of Franklin D. Roosevelt delivered the Democrats virtually uncontested dominance. By the time of their sweeping victory in 1936, the Party had become dominated by the New Deal Coalition, remaining unchallenged until Dwight D. Eisenhower led Republicans to victory in 1952.

Farmer-Labor and Progressive parties represented in green.
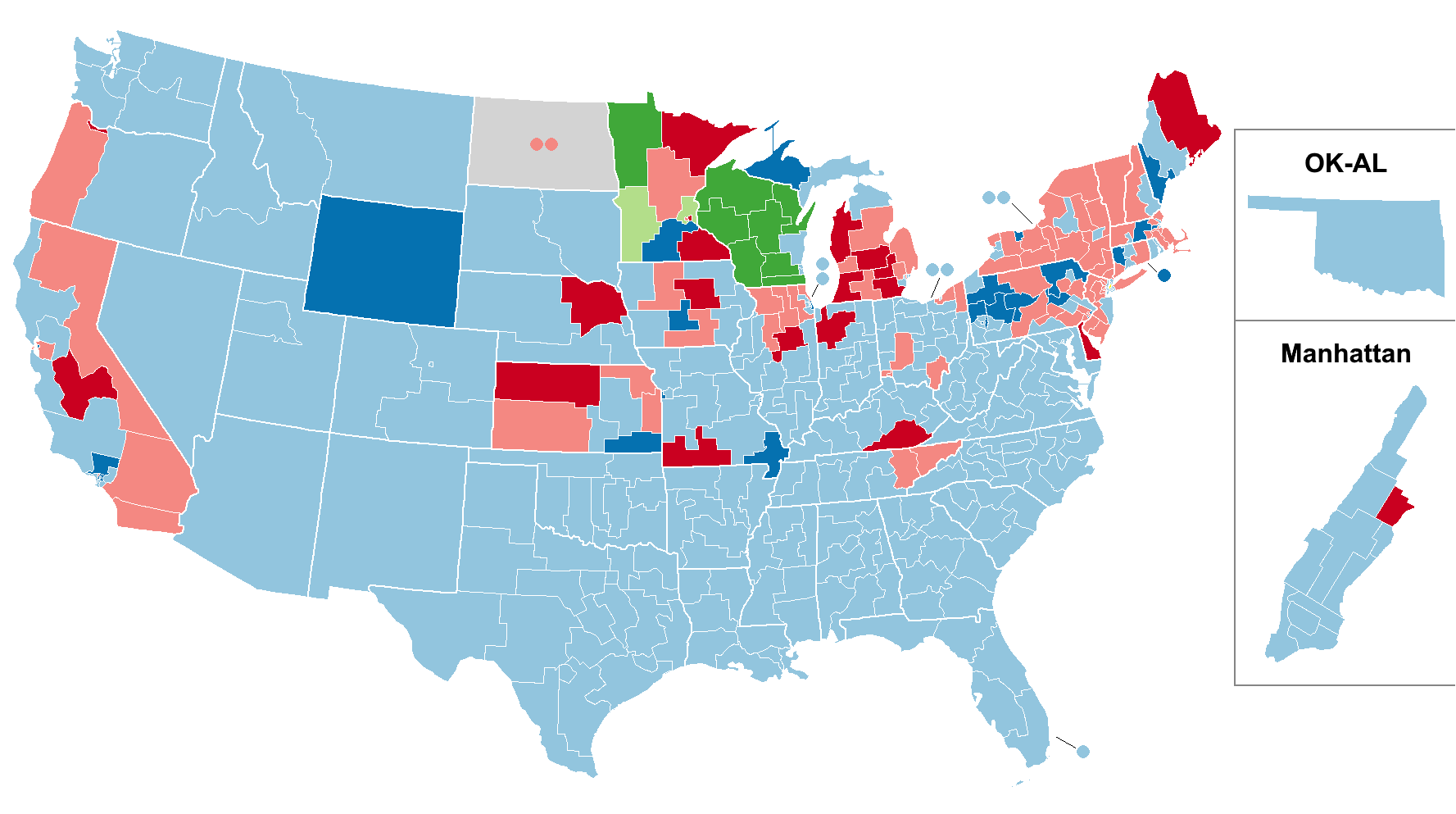

Throughout the 1930s and 1940s, third parties such as the Minnesota Farmer–Labor Party, Wisconsin Progressive Party, and Nonpartisan League saw renewed electoral success, most notably in the Upper Midwest. In 1936, the American Labor Party formed, and 1938 saw the National Progressives of America emerge out of the Wisconsin Progressive Party.

Despite the power of the New Dealers, the conservative coalition, comprising northern Republicans and southern Democrats, generally controlled Congress from 1938 to 1964. Nevertheless, the New Deal Coalition quickly grew to include a range of politicians unusual at the time for its diversity. Although still broadly consisting of the White Anglo-Saxon Protestants who dominated the conservative coalition as well, New Dealers also grew to include new ethno-religious constituencies, such as Catholics and Jews, in addition to liberal White southerners, trade unionists, urban machinists, progressive intellectuals, populist farm groups, and even some ex-Republicans from the Northeast. These groups all became primary voting blocs of the Democratic Party that are still dominant in the modern era.

The Republican Party underwent a dramatic ideological change of its own during this period, consisting of a conservative wing led by Senator Robert A. Taft and then Barry Goldwater, and a moderate to liberal wing led by Thomas Dewey, Nelson Rockefeller, Earl Warren, Jacob Javits, George W. Romney, William Scranton, Henry Cabot Lodge Jr., and Prescott Bush. The liberal wing experienced more electoral victories than the conservatives until the election of Richard Nixon in 1968, marking conservative Republicans' first major victory, as Eisenhower had been more aligned with the Party's liberal wing. Despite his rhetoric, Nixon continued and expanded on liberal policies stating in 1971 "We are all Keynesians now". However, Nixon's implication in the Watergate scandal ruined him and badly damaged public perception of the Republican Party nationwide until 1980, when Ronald Reagan was elected president and successfully revitalized the party. With his ascension, Reagan effectively swept away the last remnants of the party's liberal wing, who had all switched to the Democratic Party by this time. For this reason, Reagan's election is widely regarded as marking the end of the Fifth Party System and the beginning of the Sixth Party System that arguably continues today.

== Analysis ==
United States presidential election results between 1964 and 1976 during the Dealignment Period

The party system model with its numbering and demarcation of the historical systems was introduced in 1967 by Chambers and Burnham. Much of the work published on the subject has been by political scientists explaining the events of their time as either the imminent breakup of the Fifth Party System, and the installation of a new one, or suggesting that this transition had already taken place some time ago. The notion of an end to the Fifth Party system was particularly popular in the 1970s, with some specifying a culminating date as early as 1960.

In Parties and Elections in America: The Electoral Process (2011), authors L. Sandy Maisel and Mark D. Brewer argue that the consensus among experts is that the Sixth System is underway based on American electoral politics since the 1960s:

Although most in the field now believe we are in a sixth party system, there is a fair amount of disagreement about how exactly we arrived at this new system and about its particular contours. Scholars do, however, agree that there has been significant change in American electoral politics since the 1960s.

Opinions on when the Fifth Party System ended include the following: The elections of 1966 to 1968; the election of 1972; the 1980s, when both parties began to become more unified and partisan; and the 1990s, due to cultural divisions.

Stephen Craig argues for the 1972 elections when Richard Nixon won a 49-state landslide. He notes that, "There seems to be consensus on the appropriate name for the sixth party system... Changes that occurred during the 1960s were so great and so pervasive that they cry out to be called a critical-election period. The new system of candidate-centered parties is so distinct and so portentous that one can no longer deny its existence or its character."

The Princeton Encyclopedia of American Political History dates the start of the Sixth Party system in 1980, with the election of Reagan and a Republican Senate. Arthur Paulson argues, "Whether electoral change since the 1960s is called 'realignment' or not, the 'sixth party system' emerged between 1964 and 1972."

== See also ==
- Civil rights movement (1896–1954)
- Conservative coalition
- New Deal coalition
- Party systems in the United States
- Politics of the Southern United States
- Presidency of Franklin D. Roosevelt (1933–1941)
- Presidency of Franklin D. Roosevelt (1941–1945)
- Presidency of Harry S. Truman
- Presidency of Dwight D. Eisenhower
- Presidency of John F. Kennedy
- Presidency of Lyndon B. Johnson
- Presidency of Richard Nixon
- Presidency of Gerald Ford
- Presidency of Jimmy Carter
- Reagan era
- Southern Strategy
