= American Politics Research =

Academic journal

- Discipline: Political science
- Language: English
- Edited by: Costas Panagopolous

Publication details
- Former name: American Politics Quarterly
- History: 1973-present
- Publisher: SAGE Publications
- Frequency: Bimonthly
- Impact factor: 1.089 (2017)

Standard abbreviations
- ISO 4: Am. Politics Res.

Indexing
- ISSN: 1532-673X (print); 1552-3373 (web)
- LCCN: 00215967
- OCLC no.: 45427538

Links
- Journal homepage

American Politics Research is a peer-reviewed academic journal that covers the subfield of American politics in the discipline of political science. The journal's editor-in-chief is Costas Panagopolous (Northeastern University). It was established in 1973 and is currently published by SAGE Publications.

== Abstracting and indexing ==
American Politics Research is abstracted and indexed in Scopus and the Social Sciences Citation Index. According to the Journal Citation Reports, the journal has a 2017 impact factor of 1.089, ranking it 96 out of 169 journals in the category "Political Science".
