= L. Sandy Maisel =

American political scientist (1945–2024)

- Born: Louis Maisel II; October 23, 1945; Buffalo, New York, U.S.
- Died: December 9, 2024 (aged 79); Rome, Maine, U.S.
- Political party: Democratic
- Spouse(s): Mary Lou Michael (m. 1967, divorced) Patrice Franko (m. 1994)
- Children: 2
- Parents: Sidney Beck Maisel (father); Ruthe Spero (mother)
- Relatives: Sherman J. Maisel; David H. Popper (uncles)

Academic background
- Education: Harvard University (B.A.); Columbia University (Ph.D.)

Academic work
- Discipline: Political science
- Institutions: Colby College

Louis Sandy Maisel (October 23, 1945 – December 9, 2024) was an American political scientist. A longtime professor at Colby College, his work focused on U.S. elections and political parties, particularly candidate emergence, or why potential candidates do or do not run for office.

== Background ==
Maisel was born in Buffalo, New York, on October 23, 1945, and was named for his grandfather, Louis Maisel. The son of Sidney Beck and Ruthe (née Spero) Maisel, he was born into a prominent Jewish family in Buffalo. While his father graduated from Harvard University and Harvard Law School, he took over the family's furniture business. One uncle, Sherman J. Maisel, was an economist who served as a governor of the Federal Reserve, while another, David H. Popper, was a diplomat who served as American ambassador to Cyprus and to Chile.

Graduating from the Nichols School in Buffalo, Maisel followed his father and uncles to Harvard, graduating magna cum laude in 1967. He then attended Columbia University, earning a doctorate in political science in 1971. While in school, Maisel served as a deputy campaign coordinator for Buffalo-area U.S. representative Richard D. McCarthy in 1966, worked on McCarthy's 1970 U.S. Senate campaign, and taught political science at Barnard College. He married Mary Lou Michael in 1967, and they raised two children. He would later marry Patrice Franko, an economics professor at Colby College, in 1994.

== Career ==
In 1971, Maisel was hired as an assistant professor by Colby College's department of government, and he would teach there for most of the following fifty years. While there, he was made a full professor in 1983, chaired his department for a collective 18 years, chaired the social science division from 1984 to 1987, was named the CASE Maine professor of the year in 1989, and held named professorships from 1989 until his death. Positions he held at other institutions included visiting professorships at the University of Melbourne and Monash University in 1975, Harvard University in 1987–1988, Stanford University in 1993–1994 and 2013, and the University of London in 2002; Fulbright fellowships in the Philippines in 1998 and Brazil in 2012; and a guest scholar position with the Brookings Institution in 1999.

Continuing his political activism in his new home state, Maisel served as a delegate to the 1972 and 1976 Democratic National Conventions. He also worked on the 1972 senate campaign of William Hathaway, in which he defeated longterm incumbent Margaret Chase Smith. In the 1978 elections, he ran for Maine's 1st congressional district, seeking the Democratic nomination. In December 1977, the Maine Secretary of State ruled that he would be listed on the ballot as 'Louis Maisel', his legal name. Maisel, who had been known as 'Sandy' since childhood, had his legal name changed to Louis Sandy Maisel to alter how his name would appear on the ballot, deciding that was easier than challenging the secretary's decision in court. While he lost the primary, in 1982, he would detail the campaign, in which he visited 156 communities and drove over 20,000 miles, in a book, titled From Obscurity to Oblivion: Running in the Congressional Primary. The book, for which Maisel surveyed over 250 other candidates who ran in contested 1978 congressional primaries, received generally positive reviews and was one of the first works to examine the candidate recruitment process.

After editing a series of electoral studies books for SAGE Publications, Maisel held numerous editorial positions, including sitting on the editorial boards of American Politics Quarterly, Polity, Legislative Studies Quarterly, and Political Research Quarterly. He would also serve as president of the New England Political Science Association in 1994–1995, and on the council of the American Political Science Association in 1989–1991 and 2000–2002. Authoring and editing numerous works on candidate emergence as well as U.S. elections, campaigns, and political parties, he became a noted expert in the field as well as a political commentator.

== Retirement and death ==
Maisel retired from teaching in 2021, and in 2024, he led a $3.7 million capital campaign for the Beth Israel Congregation in Waterville. He died from intestinal cancer at his home in Rome, Maine, on December 9, 2024, at the age of 79.

== Electoral history ==
=== 1978 primary election ===
United States House of Representatives, Maine's 1st district, 1978 primary election Source:
Party	Candidate	Votes	%
	John Quinn	12,579	31.0
	Guy A. Marcotte	10,628	26.2
	Richard A. Spencer	10,498	25.8
	Louis Sandy Maisel	6,919	17.0
Total votes		40,624	100

== Works ==
=== Books ===
==== Author ====
- Maisel, Louis Sandy (1982). From Obscurity to Oblivion: Running in the Congressional Primary. University of Tennessee Press. ISBN 978-0-87049-347-8.
- Maisel, L. Sandy (1987). Parties and Elections in America: The Electoral Process. McGraw-Hill. ISBN 978-0-394-33563-6.
- Bibby, John F.; Maisel, L. Sandy (1998). Two Parties—Or More?: The American Party System. Westview Press. ISBN 978-0-8133-9992-8.
- Maisel, L. Sandy (2007). American Political Parties and Elections: A Very Short Introduction. Oxford University Press. ISBN 978-0-19-988531-2.
- Maisel, L. Sandy; West, Darrell M.; Clifton, Brett M. (2007). Evaluating Campaign Quality: Can the Electoral Process be Improved?. Cambridge University Press. ISBN 978-0-521-70082-5.
- Maisel, L. Sandy; Yoder, Jennifer A. (2024). Elections: A Very Short Introduction. Oxford University Press. ISBN 978-0-19-764575-8.

==== Editor ====
- Maisel, Louis; Sacks, Paul M., eds. (1975). The Future of Political Parties. SAGE Publications. ISBN 978-0-8039-0426-2.
- Maisel, Louis, ed. (1976). Changing Campaign Techniques: Elections and Values in Contemporary Democracies. SAGE Publications. ISBN 978-0-8039-0683-9.
- Maisel, Louis; Cooper, Joseph, eds. (1977). The Impact of the Electoral Process. SAGE Publications. ISBN 978-0-803-90709-6.
- Maisel, Louis; Cooper, Joseph, eds. (1978). Political Parties: Development and Decay. SAGE Publications. ISBN 978-0-8039-0738-6.
- Maisel, Louis Sandy; Cooper, Joseph, eds. (1981). Congressional Elections. SAGE Publications. ISBN 978-0-8039-1568-8.
- Maisel, L. Sandy, ed. (1990). The Parties Respond: Changes in the American Party System. Westview Press. ISBN 978-0-8133-0881-4.
- Maisel, L. Sandy; Bassett, Charles W., eds. (1991). Political Parties & Elections in the United States: An Encyclopedia. Garland Publishing. ISBN 978-0-8240-7975-8.
- Maisel, L. Sandy; Shade, William G., eds. (1994). Parties and Politics in American History: A Reader. Garland Publishing. ISBN 978-0-8153-1690-9.
- Maisel, L. Sandy; Forman, Ira N., eds. (2001). Jews in American Politics. Rowman & Littlefield. ISBN 978-0-7425-0181-2.
- Maisel, L. Sandy; West, Darrell M., eds. (2004). Running on Empty?: Political Discourse in Congressional Elections. Rowman & Littlefield. ISBN 978-0-7425-3076-8.
- Maisel, L. Sandy; Berry, Jeffrey M., eds. (2010). The Oxford Handbook of American Political Parties and Interest Groups. Oxford University Press. ISBN 978-0-19-954262-8.
- Maisel, L. Sandy; Dineen, Hannah E., eds. (2018). Trumping Ethical Norms: Teachers, Preachers, Pollsters, and the Media Respond to Donald Trump. Routledge. ISBN 978-1-351-12088-3.

=== Articles ===
- Maisel, Louis (1976). "The Sixth American Party System: Two Plus N Parties?". Melbourne Journal of Politics. 7.
- Helmer, John; Maisel, Louis (Winter 1978). "Analytical Problems in the Study of Presidential Advice: The Domestic Council Staff in Flux". Presidential Studies Quarterly. 8 (1): 45–67. JSTOR 27547376.
- Maisel, L. Sandy (January 1981). "Congressional Elections in 1978: The Road to the Nomination, the Road to the Election". American Politics Quarterly. 9 (1): 23–47. doi:10.1177/1532673X8100900102.
- Maisel, L. Sandy (Fall 1983). "Teaching the Congress and Legislative Process Courses". News for Teachers of Political Science. 39: 9–11. doi:10.1017/S0197901900004438.
- Brady, David W.; Bullock III, Charles S.; Maisel, L. Sandy (January 1988). "The Electoral Antecedents of Policy Innovations: A Comparative Analysis". Comparative Political Studies. 20 (4): 395–422. doi:10.1177/0010414088020004001.
- Maisel, L. Sandy (Winter 1993–1994). "The Platform-Writing Process: Candidate-Centered Platforms in 1992". Political Science Quarterly. 108 (4): 671–698. doi:10.2307/2152404. JSTOR 2152404.
- Maisel, L. Sandy (September 1995). "On the Inadequacy and Inappropriateness of the Replication Standard". PS: Political Science & Politics. 28 (3): 467–470. doi:10.2307/420308. JSTOR 420308.
- Maisel, L. Sandy; Stone, Walter J. (February 1997). "Determinants of Candidate Emergence in U. S. House Elections: An Exploratory Study". Legislative Studies Quarterly. 22 (1): 79–96. JSTOR 440292.
- Maisel, L. Sandy; Ivry, Elizabeth J. (Fall 1997). "If You Don't Like Our Politics, Wait a Minute: Party Politics in Maine at the Century's End". Polity Supplement. 30 (1): 15–35.
- Maisel, L. Sandy; Falkenstein, Kara E.; Quigley, Alexander M. (September 1997). "Senate Retirements and Progressive Ambition among House Members in 1996". Congress & the Presidency. 24 (2): 31–48. doi:10.1080/07343469709507815.
- Maisel, L. Sandy; Ivry, Elizabeth J. (Winter 1997). "Rethinking Conventional Wisdom on Ticket Splitting and Fall Off". Party Development.
- Maisel, L. Sandy; Stone, Walter J. (December 1998). "The Politics of Government-Funded Research: Notes from the Experience of the Candidate Emergence Study". PS: Political Science & Politics. 31 (4): 811–817. doi:10.2307/420724. JSTOR 420724.
- Maisel, L. Sandy (May 2003). "Pick a Name. Any Name". The Forum. 1 (3). doi:10.2202/1540-8884.1013.
- Stone, Walter J.; Maisel, L. Sandy (November 2003). "The Not-So-Simple Calculus of Winning: Potential U.S. House Candidates' Nomination and General Election Prospects". The Journal of Politics. 65 (4): 951–977. doi:10.1111/1468-2508.t01-1-00120. JSTOR 10.1111/1468-2508.t01-1-00120.
- Stone, Walter J.; Maisel, L. Sandy; Maestas, Cherie D. (July 2004). "Quality Counts: Extending the Strategic Politician Model of Incumbent Deterrence". American Journal of Political Science. 48 (3): 479–495. doi:10.1111/j.0092-5853.2004.00082.x. JSTOR 1519911.
- Maestas, Cherie D.; Maisel, L. Sandy; Stone, Walter J. (May 2005). "National Party Efforts to Recruit State Legislators to Run for the U.S. House". Legislative Studies Quarterly. 30 (2): 277–300. doi:10.3162/036298005X201554. JSTOR 3598673.
- West, Darrell M.; Maisel, L. Sandy; Clifton, Brett M. (Winter 2005–2006). "The Impact of Campaign Reform on Political Discourse". Political Science Quarterly. 120 (4): 637–651. doi:10.1002/j.1538-165X.2005.tb00560.x. JSTOR 20202602.
- Maestas, Cherie D.; Fulton, Sarah A.; Maisel, L. Sandy; Stone, Walter J. (May 2006). "When to Risk It? Institutions, Ambitions, and the Decision to Run for the U.S. House". American Political Science Review. 100 (2): 195–208. doi:10.1017/S0003055406062101. JSTOR 27644344.
- Fulton, Sarah A.; Maestas, Cherie D.; Maisel, L. Sandy; Stone, Walter J. (June 2006). "The Sense of a Woman: Gender, Ambition, and the Decision to Run for Congress". Political Research Quarterly. 59 (2): 235–248. doi:10.1177/106591290605900206. JSTOR 4148091.
- Stone, Walter J.; Fulton, Sarah A.; Maestas, Cherie D.; Maisel, L. Sandy (January 2010). "Incumbency Reconsidered: Prospects, Strategic Retirement, and Incumbent Quality in U.S. House Elections". The Journal of Politics. 72 (1): 178–190. doi:10.1017/S0022381609990557. hdl:1969.1/182231. JSTOR 10.1017/s0022381609990557.
- Maisel, L. Sandy; Rouse, Justin; Wilson, Russell (2011). "Unconventional Wisdom: The Future of Presidential Nominating Conventions". New England Journal of Political Science. 5 (2): 230–264.
- Maisel, L. Sandy (July 2012). "The Negative Consequences of Uncivil Political Discourse". PS: Political Science & Politics. 45 (3): 405–411. doi:10.1017/S1049096512000467. JSTOR 41691353.
- Maisel, L. Sandy; Stone, Walter J. (Fall 2014). "Candidate Emergence Revisited: The Lingering Effects of Recruitment, Ambition, and Successful Prospects among House Candidates". Political Science Quarterly. 129 (3): 429–447. doi:10.1002/polq.12217. JSTOR 43828436.
- Maisel, L. Sandy (2016). "Why Did No One See this Coming? How Did It Happen?: The 2016 Presidential Election". Maine Policy Review. 25 (2): 63–65. doi:10.53558/SPWP2303.

=== Chapters ===
- Maisel, Louis (1975). "Party Reform and Political Participation: The Democrats in Maine". In Maisel, Louis; Sacks, Paul M. (eds.). The Future of Political Parties. SAGE Publications. pp. 193–220. ISBN 978-0-8039-0426-2.
- Maisel, Louis (1976). "Public Financing and the Two-Party System: A Commentary". In Maisel, Louis (ed.). Changing Campaign Techniques: Elections and Values in Contemporary Democracies. SAGE Publications. pp. 79–92. ISBN 978-0-8039-0683-9.
- Maisel, Louis; Lieberman, Gerald J. (1977). "The Impact of Electoral Rules on Primary Elections: The Democratic Presidential Primaries in 1976". In Maisel, Louis; Cooper, Joseph (eds.). The Impact of the Electoral Process. SAGE Publications. pp. 39–80. ISBN 978-0-8039-0709-6.
- Cooper, Joseph; Maisel, Louis (1978). "Problems and Trends in Party Research: An Overview". In Maisel, Louis; Cooper, Joseph (eds.). Political Parties: Development and Decay. SAGE Publications. pp. 7–30. ISBN 978-0-8039-0738-6.
- Maisel, Louis Sandy (1981). "Congressional Information Sources". In Cooper, Joseph; Mackenzie, G. Calvin (eds.). The House at Work. University of Texas Press. pp. 247–274. doi:10.7560/730175. ISBN 978-0-292-77157-4. JSTOR 10.7560/730175.15.
- Maisel, L. Sandy (1986). "Between Light and Shadow: The Political Context". In Rapoport, Ronald B.; Abramowitz, Alan I.; McGlennon, John (eds.). The Life of the Parties: Activists in Presidential Politics. University Press of Kentucky. pp. 29–43. ISBN 978-0-8131-1559-7. JSTOR j.ctt130jbn7.7.
- Hauss, Charles S.; Maisel, L. Sandy (1986). "Extremist Delegates: Myth and Reality". In Rapoport, Ronald B.; Abramowitz, Alan I.; McGlennon, John (eds.). The Life of the Parties: Activists in Presidential Politics. University Press of Kentucky. pp. 215–226. ISBN 978-0-8131-1559-7. JSTOR j.ctt130jbn7.16.
- Maisel, L. Sandy (1990). "The Evolution of Political Parties: Toward the 21st Century". In Maisel, L. Sandy (ed.). The Parties Respond: Changes in the American Party System (1st ed.). Westview Press. pp. 307–323. ISBN 978-0-8133-0881-4.
- Maisel, L. Sandy (1990). "The Incumbency Advantage". In Nugent, Margaret Latus; Johannes, John R. (eds.). Money, Elections, and Democracy: Reforming Congressional Campaign Finance. Westview Press. pp. 119–141. ISBN 978-0-8133-7891-6.
- Maisel, L. Sandy; Fowler, Linda L.; Jones, Ruth S.; Stone, Walter J. (1990). "The Naming of Candidates: Recruitment or Emergence?". In Maisel, L. Sandy (ed.). The Parties Respond: Changes in the American Party System (1st ed.). Westview Press. pp. 137–159. ISBN 978-0-8133-0881-4.
- Maisel, L. Sandy (1992). "Quality Candidates in House and Senate Elections, from 1982 to 1990". In Hertzke, Allen D.; Peters Jr., Ronald M. (eds.). The Atomistic Congress: An Interpretation of Congressional Change. M. E. Sharpe. pp. 141–174. ISBN 978-0-87332-870-8.
- Maisel, L. Sandy (1992). "挑戦することなしに相手を倒すことはできない--分割政府1992年とその後" [You Can't Defeat Your Opponent Without Trying: Divided Government 1992 and Beyond]. In Abe, Hitoshi (ed.). アメリカ現代政治 [Contemporary American Politics]. University of Tokyo Press. ISBN 978-4-13-032047-4.
- Maisel, L. Sandy (1994). "Competition in Congressional Elections: Why More Qualified Candidates Do Not Seek Office". Rethinking Political Reform: Beyond Spending and Term Limits. Progressive Foundation. pp. 21–32.
- Maisel, L. Sandy (1994). "Legislative Work Load". In Silbey, Joel H. (ed.). Encyclopedia of the American Legislative System. Charles Scribner's Sons. pp. 1143–1153. ISBN 978-0-684-19600-8.
- Maisel, L. Sandy; Fowler, Linda L.; Jones, Ruth S.; Stone, Walter J. (1994). "Nomination Politics: The Roles of Institutional, Contextual, and Personal Variables". In Maisel, L. Sandy (ed.). The Parties Respond: Changes in the American Party System (2nd ed.). Westview Press. pp. 145–168. ISBN 978-0-8133-1722-9.
- Maisel, L. Sandy (1994). "Political Parties at the Century's End". In Maisel, L. Sandy (ed.). The Parties Respond: Changes in the American Party System (2nd ed.). Westview Press. pp. 379–395. ISBN 978-0-8133-1722-9.
- Maisel, L. Sandy (1994). "Political Parties in a Nonparty Era: Adapting to a New Role". In Maisel, L. Sandy; Shade, William G. (eds.). Parties and Politics in American History: A Reader. Garland Publishing. pp. 259–269. ISBN 978-0-8153-1690-9.
- Maisel, L. Sandy; Ivry, Elizabeth J.; Ling, Benjamin D.; Pennix, Stephanie G. (1996). "Re-exploring the Weak-Challenger Hypothesis: The 1994 Candidate Pools". In Klinkner, Philip A. (ed.). Midterm: The Elections of 1994 in Context. Routledge. ISBN 978-0-8133-2818-8.
- Maisel, L. Sandy; Gibson, Cary T.; Ivry, Elizabeth J. (1998). "The Continuing Importance of the Rules of the Game: Subpresidential Nominations in 1994 and 1996". In Maisel, L. Sandy (ed.). The Parties Respond: Changes in the American Party System (3rd ed.). Westview Press. pp. 147–169. ISBN 978-0-8133-9960-7.
- Maisel, L. Sandy (1998). "Political Parties on the Eve of the Millennium". In Maisel, L. Sandy (ed.). The Parties Respond: Changes in the American Party System (3rd ed.). Westview Press. pp. 356–371. ISBN 978-0-8133-9960-7.
- Maisel, L. Sandy (2001). "American Political Parties: Still Central to a Functioning Democracy?". In Cohen, Jeffrey E.; Fleisher, Richard; Kantor, Paul (eds.). American Political Parties: Decline or Resurgence. CQ Press. pp. 103–121. ISBN 978-1-4833-0029-0.
- Maisel, L. Sandy; Stone, Walter J. (2001). "Primary Elections as a Deterrence to Candidacy for the U.S. House of Representatives". In Galderisi, Peter F.; Ezra, Marni; Lyons, Michael (eds.). Congressional Primaries and the Politics of Representation. Rowman & Littlefield. pp. 29–47. ISBN 978-0-7425-0767-8.
- Maisel, L. Sandy; Stone, Walter J.; Maestas, Cherie (2001). "Quality Challengers to Congressional Incumbents: Can Better Candidates Be Found". In Herrnson, Paul S. (ed.). Playing Hardball: Campaigning for the U.S. Congress. Prentice Hall. pp. 12–40. ISBN 978-0-13-027133-4.
- Maisel, L. Sandy; Bibby, John F. (2002). "Election Laws, Court Rulings, Party Rules and Practices: Steps Toward and Away from a Stronger Party Role". In Green, John C.; Herrnson, Paul S. (eds.). Responsible Partisanship?: The Evolution of American Political Parties Since 1950. University Press of Kansas. pp. 61–81. ISBN 978-0-7006-1217-8.
- Maisel, L. Sandy; Maestas, Cherie; Stone, Walter J. (2002). "The Party Role in Congressional Competition". In Maisel, L. Sandy (ed.). The Parties Respond: Changes in the American Party System (4th ed.). Westview Press. pp. 121–138. ISBN 978-0-8133-4022-7.
- Maisel, L. Sandy (2002). "Promises and Persuasion". In Nelson, Candice J.; Dulio, David A.; Medvic, Stephen K. (eds.). Shades of Gray: Perspectives on Campaign Ethics. Brookings Institution Press. pp. 39–60. ISBN 978-0-8157-0618-2. JSTOR 10.7864/j.ctt127z4d.7.
- Maisel, L. Sandy; Maestas, Cherie D.; Stone, Walter J. (2005). "The Impact of Redistricting on Candidate Emergence". In Mann, Thomas E.; Cain, Bruce E. (eds.). Party Lines: Competition, Partisanship, and Congressional Redistricting. Brookings Institution Press. pp. 31–50. ISBN 978-0-8157-5468-8. JSTOR 10.7864/j.ctt12879xs.6.
- Maisel, L. Sandy; Berry, Jeffrey M. (2010). "The State of Research on Political Parties and Interest Groups". In Maisel, L. Sandy; Berry, Jeffrey M. (eds.). The Oxford Handbook of American Political Parties and Interest Groups. Oxford University Press. pp. 3–18. ISBN 978-0-19-954262-8.
- Stone, Walter J.; Maisel, L. Sandy; Lowman, Trevor C. (2012). "Boehner's Dilemma: A Tempest in a Tea Party?". In Brewer, Mark D.; Maisel, L. Sandy (eds.). The Parties Respond: Changes in the American Party System (5th ed.). Westview Press. pp. 213–236. ISBN 978-0-8133-4601-4.
- Maisel, L. Sandy (2012). "Political Parties, American". In Coates, David (ed.). The Oxford Companion to American Politics. Vol. 2. Oxford University Press. pp. 209–217. ISBN 978-0-19-976431-0.
- Maisel, L. Sandy (2013). "Jewish Elected Officials for National Office, 1945–2013: From Representing Fellow Jews to Assimilated American Politicians". In Zuckerman, Bruce; Schnur, Dan; Ansell, Lisa (eds.). American Politics and the Jewish Community. Purdue University Press. pp. 99–122. doi:10.2307/j.ctt6wq3pj.9. ISBN 978-1-55753-659-4. JSTOR j.ctt6wq3pj.9.

=== Other works ===
- Maisel, Louis (1972). Process and Policy in the House of Representatives: Congressional Housing Politics, 1961–1968 (Ph.D. thesis). Columbia University.
- Maestas, Cherie; Maisel, L. Sandy; Stone, Walter J. (April 1999). "Stepping Up or Stopping?: Candidate Emergence Among State Legislators" (PDF). Southwest Political Science Association.
- Stone, Walter J.; Hadley, Nathan J.; Peterson, Rolfe D.; Maestas, Cherie D.; Maisel, L. Sandy (September 2006). "Candidate Quality and Voter Response in U.S. House Elections". Working Papers in Economics. Colby College Goldfarb Center for Public Affairs.
