= Duverger's law =

Plurality voting in single-member districts tends to favor two-party competition

In political science, Duverger's law (/ˈduːvərʒeɪ/ DOO-vər-zhay) is the proposition that single-member districts using plurality voting (first-past-the-post) tend to favor two-party competition. Maurice Duverger attributed this tendency to a mechanical effect, in which smaller parties have difficulty winning seats, and a psychological effect, in which voters and political parties may coordinate around candidates perceived as more viable. The proposition describes a tendency rather than an invariant rule; its effects also depend on social and political context, the geographical distribution of party support, and strategic behavior.

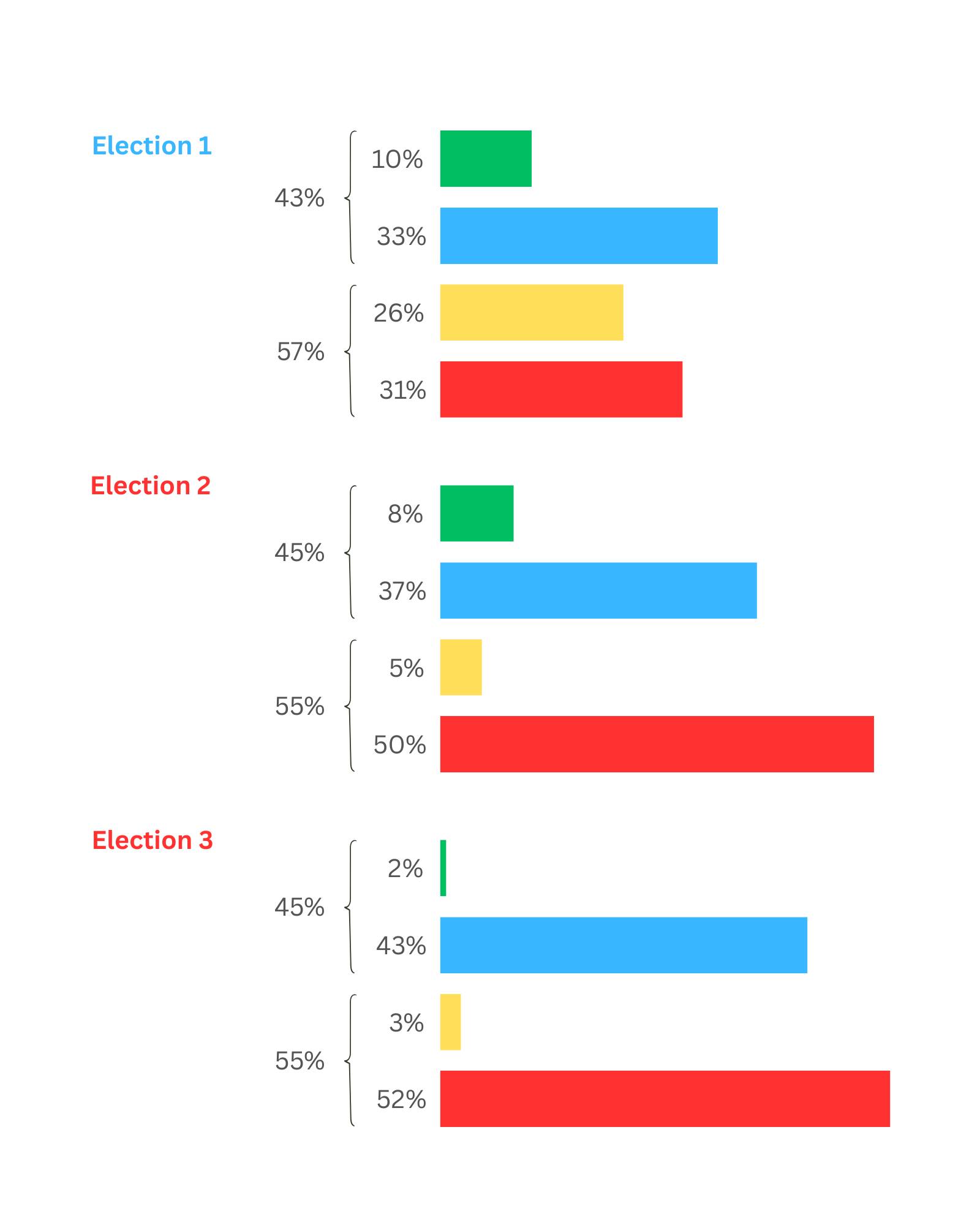
In this hypothetical example, Green and Yellow parties do not win elections but draw support from the bases of similar parties. After the spoiler effect prevents the more popular outcome, voters abandon the minority parties, creating a de-facto two-party system.

Duverger also proposed that proportional representation tends to favor multiparty systems, while majority systems using two-round elections tend to favor multiparty competition, often with coalition-building between rounds. These are general tendencies rather than categorical rules. Their effects vary with features such as district magnitude, electoral thresholds, the geographical distribution of party support, and the incentives for strategic coordination.

== Mechanism ==
A two-party system is most common under plurality voting. Voters typically cast one vote per race. Maurice Duverger argued there were two main mechanisms by which plurality voting systems lead to fewer major parties: (i) small parties are disincentivized to form because they have great difficulty winning seats or representation, and (ii) voters are wary of voting for a smaller party whose policies they actually favor because they do not want to "waste" their votes on a party unlikely to win a plurality and therefore tend to gravitate to one of two major parties that is more likely to achieve a plurality, win the election, and implement policy.

For legislatures where each seat represents a geographical area and the candidate with the most votes wins that seat, minor parties that are spread fairly evenly across many districts win less representation than geographically concentrated ones with the same overall level of public support. An example of this was the Liberal Democrats in the United Kingdom, whose proportion of seats in the legislature was, until recently, significantly less than their proportion of the national vote. The Green Party of Canada is another example; the party received about 5% of the popular vote from 2004 to 2011 but had only won one seat (out of 308) in the House of Commons in the same span of time. Another example was seen in the 1992 U.S. presidential election, when Ross Perot's candidacy received zero electoral votes despite receiving 19% of the popular vote. Gerrymandering is sometimes used to try to collect a population of like-minded voters within a geographically cohesive district so that their votes are not "wasted", but it tends to require that minor parties have both a geographic concentration and a redistricting process that seeks to represent them. These disadvantages tend to suppress the ability of a third party to engage in the political process.

The second challenge to a third party is both statistical and tactical. Duverger presents the example of an election in which 100,000 moderate voters and 80,000 radical voters are to vote for candidates for a single seat or office. If two moderate parties and one radical party ran candidates, and every voter voted, the radical candidate would tend to win unless one of the moderate candidates gathered fewer than 20,000 votes. Appreciating this risk, moderate voters would be inclined to vote for the moderate candidate they deemed likely to gain more votes, with the goal of defeating the radical candidate. To win, then, either the two moderate parties must merge, or one moderate party must fail, as the voters gravitate to the two strongest parties. Duverger called this trend polarization.

=== Direction of effect ===
Kenneth Benoit suggested causal influence between electoral and party systems might be bidirectional or in either direction. Similarly, Josep Colomer argued that changes from a plurality system to a proportional system are typically preceded by the emergence of more than two effective parties, and increases in the effective number of parties happen not in the short term, but in the mid-to-long term.

=== Swap between parties ===
The political chaos in the United States immediately preceding the Civil War allowed the Republican Party to replace the Whig Party as the progressive half of the American political landscape. Loosely united on a platform of country-wide economic reform and federally funded industrialization, the decentralized Whig leadership failed to take a decisive stance on the slavery issue, effectively splitting the party along the Mason–Dixon line. Southern rural planters, initially attracted by the prospect of federal infrastructure and schools, aligned with the pro-slavery Democrats, while urban laborers and professionals in the northern states, threatened by the sudden shift in political and economic power and losing faith in the failing Whig candidates, flocked to the increasingly vocal anti-slavery Republican Party.

The seat product model (SPM) is a quantitative logical prediction model of commonly used electoral systems in political science. It was pioneered by Matthew Shugart and Rein Taagepera, supplying the main theses in their joint book 'Votes from Seats: Logical Models of Electoral systems'. The SPM is the extension of the so-called Duverger's law(s), however it is formulated to be more precise and informative, in line with the creators' ambition of making political science more scientific. The seat product model is not just a directional, but a quantitative prediction model, moreover, it is both logically derived and empirically tested.

== Duverger's "law" vs. the seat product model ==
The seat product model is a logical model proposed as an extension or replacement for Duverger's law by political scientists Matthew Shugart and Rein Taagepera. They build on Cox's "M+1 rule", which in itself was a generalization of Duverger's law. The authors, as Duverger himself did not consider Duverger's 'law' a law in the scientific sense. The seat product model is the main model of the "macro" approach to the effects of electoral systems within the institutionalist framework. (in an analogous way to macro and micro economics) This approach aims to provide top-down predictions on the party systems of countries, hyperbolically positing that "all politics is national".

The seat product refers to the product of the number of seats in the main chamber of the legislature, the assembly size (S) and the average district magnitude (M). The multiplication of these two main institutional factors give the seat product itself (MS), which in turn is used in predictive equations.

The four basic laws of the seat product model are:

1. Effective number of parliamentary parties (ENPP): $N_s=(MS)^{1/6}$
2. Seat share of the largest party: $s_1=(MS)^{-1/8}$
3. Effective number of electoral parties (ENEP): $N_v=\left((MS)^{1/4}+1\right)^{2/3}$
4. Vote share of the largest party: $v_1=\left((MS)^{1/4}+1\right)^{-1/2}$

An aim of the seat product is to not only formulate testable hypotheses, but to be able to make quantitative predictions. Precursors to the seat product model can be found in Taagepera's previous work, and the logic of the model bears resemblance to the cube root law also connected to his name.

The seat product model implies that the most effective electoral reforms to increase or decrease the number of parties is are to change either the assembly size or the district magnitude. By comparison, electoral formula, such as a choice between the D'Hondt or the largest remainders method, or a switch from plurality to a runoff or ranked-choice system is deemed secondary. In a blind setting, doubling assembly size or doubling the average district magnitude should have the same effect.

== Strength of effect ==
Cross-national evidence supports a general tendency toward two-party competition under plurality rule, but not a universal outcome. A study of 6,745 single-member-district election contests in 53 democratic countries found that the two largest parties generally dominated contests under plurality rule, while third-place parties did not disappear entirely. The study also found that ethnic divisions and electoral arrangements generating multiparty systems elsewhere in a country were associated with greater fragmentation within single-member plurality districts.

Duverger did not regard this principle as absolute, suggesting instead that plurality would act to delay the emergence of new political forces and would accelerate the elimination of weakening ones, whereas proportional representation would have the opposite effect.

William Clark and Matt Golder (2006) find that the effect largely holds up, noting that different methods of analyzing the data might lead to different conclusions. They emphasize the importance of other variables, including differences between electoral institutions and the sociological factors that Duverger himself also considered.

Theoretical models have also demonstrated how two-party competition can emerge under particular assumptions about electoral behavior. Thomas R. Palfrey presented a mathematical model in which Duverger's law emerges as an equilibrium outcome when voters behave strategically in a large electorate.

Steven R. Reed argued in 2001 that Duverger's law could be observed in Italy, with 80% of electoral districts gradually but significantly shifting towards two major parties. Reed also found a similar effect in Japan, where a gradual process of electoral adaptation shifted competition towards the expected outcome.

The United States is another example of a political system dominated by two major parties. The two parties have won, on average, 98% of all state and federal seats. There have been relatively few elections in which a minor party has been competitive with the major parties, occasionally replacing one of them in the 19th century.

However, the strength of Duverger's law varies with social and political context. Eric Dickson and Kenneth Scheve argued that the law is strongest when a society is homogeneous or closely divided, but is weakened when multiple intermediate identities exist. As evidence of the importance of social and territorial divisions, Duhamel cites India, where more than 25% of voters support parties outside the two main alliances.

In Matt Golder's 2016 review of the empirical evidence, he concluded that, despite contradictory cases, Duverger's law remains a valid generalization.

== Exceptions ==
First-past-the-post voting can result in landslide victories, where one party wins a large proportion of or all seats, for example 2022 Barbadian general election. Such victories do not by themselves contradict Duverger's law, which concerns the tendency toward two-party competition rather than the proportionality of seats to votes.

=== Regional parties ===
Effect of Duverger's law in UK. The graph shows the vote share of each political party since 1832. Around 1920, a third party (Labour, red) displaces one of the two major parties at the time (Liberal, orange). After 1980, several third parties build local strongholds and reduce the vote share of the two major parties.

Some minor parties in winner-take-all systems have managed to translate their support into winning seats in government by focusing on local races, taking the place of a major party, or changing the political system.

William H. Riker, citing Douglas W. Rae, noted that strong regional parties can lead to more than two parties receiving seats in the national legislature, even if there are only two parties competitive in any single district. In systems outside the United States, like Canada, the United Kingdom and India, multiparty parliaments exist due to the growth of minor parties finding strongholds in specific regions, potentially lessening the psychological fear of a wasted vote by voting for a minor party for a legislative seat.

Regional parties are not the only explanation for departures from Duverger's law. A comparative study of 216 parliamentary elections in nine democracies using plurality rule identified several types of outcomes that depart from two-party competition. It found that territorial splits explain only a small proportion of these cases; other patterns include cases of dominant parties and cases in which multiparty competition persists within electoral districts.

== Different voting systems ==
Electoral systems differ in the incentives they create for parties and voters. Reforms such as ranked-choice voting may allow voters to express preferences among more candidates without replacing a winner-take-all system with proportional representation.

Under proportional representation, legislative seats are allocated according to the votes parties receive, generally making it easier for smaller parties to gain representation than under plurality rule. Proportional representation therefore tends to favor multiparty systems, although its effects depend on the particular electoral rules and political context.

However, two-party politics may also emerge under proportional representation. Duverger's law can be understood not only as a tendency toward two-party competition under plurality rule, but also as a constraint on the number of major parties under other electoral systems. In this sense, Duvergerian incentives may limit party-system fragmentation without necessarily producing a two-party equilibrium, particularly under proportional representation.

In ranked-choice voting and other preferential voting systems, voters rank candidates in order of preference rather than selecting only one candidate. Such systems take different forms: for example, Australia and Ireland use preferential voting under electoral rules that differ in important respects, including constituency structure and vote-counting methods. These differences affect the incentives for strategic voting and party competition.

Duverger also argued that a majority vote using two ballots tends to favor a multiparty system, often with parties forming coalitions between rounds. In a two-round system, parties can compete separately in the first round and coordinate before the second. Duverger therefore distinguished these systems from plurality elections decided in a single round, while suggesting that proportional representation generally provides more favorable conditions for multiparty competition.

== See also ==
- Seat product model - a Duvergerian logical predictive model of electoral systems
- Efficiency gap – Measure of the fairness of electoral districts
- Micromega rule – Preferences of political parties for electoral systems - a theory that political parties choose voting systems
- Median voter theorem – Theorem in political science
- Mouseland – Canadian political fable
- Observations named after people – Adages and sayings named after a person
- Spoiler effect
- Two-party-preferred vote – Result of election after distribution of preferences
