= Seat product model =

Electoral system prediction model

The seat product model (SPM) is a quantitative logical prediction model of commonly used electoral systems in political science. It was pioneered by Matthew Shugart and Rein Taagepera, supplying the main theses in their joint book 'Votes from Seats: Logical Models of Electoral systems'. The SPM is the extension of the so-called Duverger's law(s), however it is formulated to be more precise and informative, in line with the creators' ambition of making political science more scientific. The seat product model is not just a directional, but a quantitative prediction model, moreover, it is both logically derived and empirically tested.

The seat product refers to the product of the number of seats in the main chamber of the legislature, the assembly size (S) and the average district magnitude (M). The multiplication of these two main institutional factors give the seat product itself (MS), which in turn is used in predictive equations.

The seat product model is the main model of the "macro" approach to the effects of electoral systems within the institutionalist framework. (in an analogous way to macro and micro economics) This approach aims to provide top-down predictions on the party systems of countries, hyperbolically positing that "all politics is national".

The four basic laws of the seat product model are:

1. Effective number of parliamentary parties (ENPP): $N_s=(MS)^{1/6}$
2. Seat share of the largest party: $s_1=(MS)^{-1/8}$
3. Effective number of electoral parties (ENEP): $N_v=\left((MS)^{1/4}+1\right)^{2/3}$
4. Vote share of the largest party: $v_1=\left((MS)^{1/4}+1\right)^{-1/2}$

== Duverger's "law" vs. the seat product model ==
Maurice Duverger argued plurality based winner take all voting systems lead to fewer major parties: (i) small parties are disincentivized to form because they have great difficulty winning seats or representation, and (ii) voters are wary of voting for a smaller party whose policies they actually favor because they do not want to "waste" their votes on a party unlikely to win a plurality and therefore tend to gravitate to one of two major parties that is more likely to achieve a plurality, win the election, and implement policy. Duverger did not regard this principle as absolute, suggesting instead that plurality would act to delay the emergence of new political forces and would accelerate the elimination of weakening ones, whereas proportional representation would have the opposite effect.

However, Duverger himself did not consider this a 'law', moreover it is not a single claim. An aim of the seat product is to not only formulate testable hyptheses, but to be able to make quantitative predictions.

Precursors to the seat product model can be found in Taagepera's previous work, and the logic of the model bears resemblance to the cube root law also connected to his name.

The seat product model for votes builds on Cox's "M+1 rule".

== Implications and reception ==
The seat product model implies that the most effective electoral reforms to increase or decrease the number of parties is are to change either the assembly size or the district magnitude. By comparison, electoral formula, such as a choice between the D'Hondt or the largest remainders method, or a switch from plurality to a runoff or ranked-choice system is deemed secondary. In a blind setting, doubling assembly size or doubling the average district magnitude should have the same effect.Leading scholars of electoral systems, such as Arend Lijphart, Simon Hix and Josep M. Colomer have praised the work of Shugart and Taagepera on the SPM.

== See also ==
- Duverger's law
- Cube root law
- Micromega rule – Preferences of political parties for electoral systems
