= Matthew Søberg Shugart =

American political scientist

- Education: University of California, Irvine
- Awards: George H. Hallett Award, APSA; Choice outstanding academic title
- Scientific career
- Fields: Political science
- Workplaces: University of California, San Diego; University of Haifa; University of California, Davis

Matthew Søberg Shugart is an American political scientist. He is a Distinguished Professor of political science at the University of California, Davis. He is also an Affiliated Professor at the University of Haifa. Shugart specializes in electoral systems, party systems, and the design of political institutions, primarily through empirical studies of political systems across large numbers of countries. Shugart is also an orchardist, and runs the Fruits and Votes blog on electoral systems and fruit growing.

== Education and positions ==
Shugart attended the University of California, Irvine, where he graduated with a B.A. degree in political science in 1983. He continued to study political science at the University of California, Irvine, obtaining an M.A. degree in 1985 and a Ph.D. in 1988.

In 1989, Shugart became a professor in the Department of Political Science and School of International Relations and Pacific Studies at The University of California, San Diego. In 2013, he moved to The University of California, Davis. In June 2016, Shugart became an Affiliated Professor at the University of Haifa, and in 2018 he was made a Distinguished Professor at The University of California, Davis. He has held temporary or visiting positions at several universities in the United States, Europe, Australia, and Israel.

== Research ==
In addition to peer-reviewed journal articles and chapters in edited volumes, Shugart has been an author or editor of numerous books. His first book, coauthored with Rein Taagepera, was Seats and Votes: The Effects and Determinants of Electoral Systems, published in 1989. The book is an empirical study of electoral systems and electoral rules, which determine how votes cast in an election are converted into seats in a legislature. One of the central variables that Taagepera and Shugart study is electoral district magnitude and its effects; they demonstrate that in plurality voting systems a larger district magnitude means a less proportional legislature, whereas in proportional voting systems a larger district magnitude means a more proportional legislature. They study this proportionality by developing a notion of the discrepancy between the proportionality of the system and perfect proportionality, noting that no electoral system can be perfectly proportional. Seats and votes presents comparisons between specific cases, including detailed discussions of New Zealand, Finland, and Japan, as well as general principles, such as the observation that the number of members in the lower house of a legislature tends to resemble the cube root of the total population. Seats and Votes has been identified as one of the first systematic empirical studies of electoral systems, building on earlier work by Maurice Duverger, Douglas W. Rae, and Arend Lijphart. In 2017, Shugart and Taagepera coauthored a second book, Votes from Seats: Logical Models of Electoral Systems. In Votes from Seats, Shugart and Taagepera again study of the relationship between electoral systems and party systems, this time presenting four power laws which use the size of a country's assembly and the magnitude of its districts to predict core features of its party system, the seat product model.

In 1992, Shugart and John M. Carey published the book Presidents and Assemblies: Constitutional Design and Electoral Dynamics. Presidents and Assemblies is a large-scale study of presidential and parliamentary government types, as well as the plethora of hybrid regimes that combine features of each. James L. Sundquist wrote that Presidents and Assemblies is "an encyclopedic, yet concise, compilation of the major structural variations in governments all over the world". Shugart and Carey evaluate the stability of presidential and parliamentary systems, in light of the argument by analysts of the third wave of democratization like Juan Linz that presidential systems are inherently less stable than parliamentary systems; to the contrary, Shugart and Carey show that presidential systems have not broken down more often than parliamentary systems. Related to their focus on hybrid regimes, Shugart and Carey study the variation that exists within presidential regime types, and the relationship between these institutional decisions and the fragmentation of the country's party system as well as the potential for conflict between its executive and legislature. Translations of chapters from Presidents and Assemblies have been published in languages including Italian, Russian, Polish, and Portuguese. Shugart and his coauthor David J. Samuels also examined executive-legislative relations in detail in their 2010 book Presidents, Parties, and Prime Ministers: How the Separation of Powers Affects Party Organization and Behavior, in which they further studied the effects of institutional rules on competition between parties.

In addition to authoring books, Shugart has edited several volumes: Presidentialism and Democracy in Latin America (2017, with Scott Mainwaring), Mixed-Member Electoral Systems: The Best of Both Worlds? (2001, with Martin P. Wattenberg), and The Oxford Handbook of Electoral Systems (2018, with Erik Herron and Robert Pekkanen). He was also an author of the 2014 book A Different Democracy: A Systematic Comparison of the American System with Thirty Other Democracies with Steven L. Taylor, Arend Lijphart, and Bernard Grofman.

Shugart has twice received the George H. Hallett Award, which is given by the Representation and Electoral Systems Section of the American Political Science Association to "the author of a book published at least ten years ago that has made a lasting contribution to the literature on representation and electoral systems". In 1999, Shugart and Rein Taagepera were given the Hallett Award for their 1989 book Seats and Votes: The Effects and Determinants of Electoral Systems. In 2014, Shugart again won the Hallett Award for his 1992 book Presidents and Assemblies: Constitutional Design and Electoral Dynamics, co-authored with John M. Carey. Shugart and Taagepera also won a 2018 Choice outstanding academic title award for Votes from Seats.

Since 2005, Shugart has run the blog Fruits and Votes, which covers both voting systems and fruit growing, and has been recommended by FairVote for its election analysis.

== Selected awards ==
- George H. Hallett Award, American Political Science Association (1999)
- George H. Hallett Award, American Political Science Association (2014)
- Choice outstanding academic title award (2018)
