= Executive (government) =

Branch overseeing administration of the state

The executive is the part of the government that executes and enforces law and policy. The powers of the executive may vary depending on the specific government office. All political systems have an executive, from democratic regimes to dictatorial ones.

== Function ==
The scope of executive power varies greatly depending on the political context in which it emerges, and it can change over time in a given country. They are usually laid out in a constitution. In democratic countries, the executive often exercises broad influence over national politics, though limitations are often applied to the executive. Executives often rely on bureaucrats to formulate government policy.

In political systems based on the separation of powers, government authority is distributed between several branches to prevent power from being concentrated in the hands of a single person or group. To achieve this, each branch is subject to checks by the other branches; in general, the executive or the legislature can propose laws, the legislature can pass or block laws, laws are then enforced by the executive, and interpreted by the judiciary. The executive can also be the source of certain types of law or law-derived rules, such as a decree, executive order, or delegated legislation. For example, the U.S. federal legislative branch frequently delegates rulemaking (creation of regulations) to the U.S. federal executive branch.

In states that are characterized to have fusion of powers, the executive performs both judicial and legislative duties.

In some presidential-parliamentary systems, the president's power over government function is limited because the nominee for prime minister must be confirmed by the majority of the assembly.

== Types ==
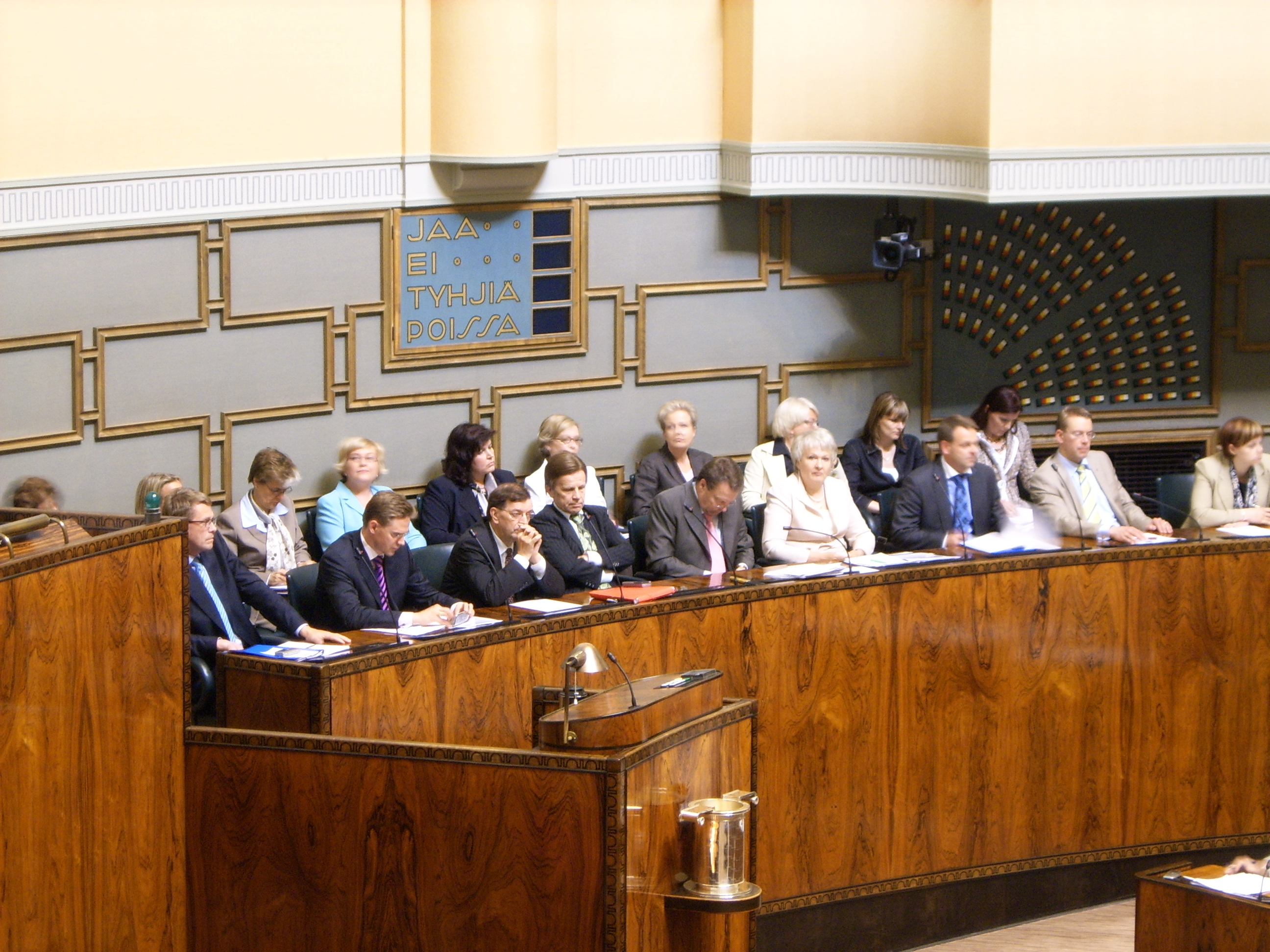
Vanhanen II Cabinet in a session of the Finnish Parliament, 2007

In parliamentary systems, the executive is responsible to the elected legislature, and must maintain the confidence of the legislature.

Parliamentary systems have a head of government which is distinct from the head of state.

Members of the executive (ministers) are also members of the legislature, and hence play an important part in both the writing and enforcing of law. In presidential systems, the directly elected head of government appoints the ministers. Ministers can be directly elected by voters, such as in Switzerland at the cantonal (state) level.

As Sartori describes it, "parliamentary systems do not permit a separation of power between parliament and government [executive]", but are based on executive-legislative power sharing. Under the fusion of powers, the executive gains legitimacy and is responsible to the legislature but the usually, in turn, the executive may dissolve the legislature. Parliamentary systems usually have a head of government which is distinct from the head of state, who does not exercise executive power. Members of the executive (ministers) are also members of the legislature, and hence play an important part in both the writing and enforcing of law.

In separation of powers models, like presidential systems, the directly elected head of government appoints the ministers. Alternatively, ministers can also be directly elected by voters, such as in Switzerland at the cantonal (state) level.

Shugart highlights two dimensions of separation of powers: origin and survival. "Origin" describes the choosing of the executive and survival is the possibility of removal of the executive. Presidential systems are separation of powers systems on both dimensions, parliamentary systems on neither, while directly elected prime ministers and assembly independent executives described by Shugart as "pure hybrids".

In states that are characterized to have unified state power, the executive performs both judicial and legislative duties. This is the case in states founded on Marxist-Leninist principles, which rejected the classical liberal understanding of the division of executive and legislative powers.

== Internal organization and personnel ==
In a presidential system, the leader of the executive is both the head of state and government. In some cases, such as South Korea, there is a Prime Minister who assists the President, but who is not the head of government but is the second in the chain.

In a parliamentary system, a cabinet minister responsible to the legislature is the head of government, while the head of state is usually a largely ceremonial monarch or president.

== See also ==
- Constitution
- Diarchy
- Legal reform
- Rule according to higher law
