= 2026 District of Columbia Democratic State Committee election =

- June 16, 2026

The 2026 District of Columbia Democratic State Committee leadership election was held on June 16, 2026, to elect 48 individuals as committee members to the District of Columbia Democratic State Committee. Seven men and seven women were elected at-large in a citywide election, while two men and two women were elected to represent each of the council wards.

== Background ==
Two main slates of candidates were organized by competing factions within the state committee. The Free DC slate was made up of progressives, while the Democrats United to Free D.C. slate represented the party establishment and many current members. While the committee members usually manage internal affairs, they are able to appoint interim council members in the event that one is elected to higher office. Candidates appeared on the ballot with their name, followed by the slate which they are aligned with.

The Free DC slate criticized the current party leadership for filing a lawsuit against Initiative 83, a ballot initiative approved in 2024 that established ranked-choice voting.

== Summary results ==
| Slate | Candidates | Wins |
|---|---|---|
| Democrats United to Free DC | 39 | 11 |
| Free DC Slate | 47 | 35 |
| Fight for Statehood | 4 | 0 |
| Act Now DC | 4 | 0 |
| N/A | 2 | 1 |

== Detailed results ==
At-large committeeman (vote for up to 7)
| Party | Candidate | Votes | % |
|---|---|---|---|
| Democratic | Andrew DeFrank Free DC Slate | 44,469 | 8.53 |
| Democratic | Maleke Glee Free DC Slate | 43,351 | 8.32 |
| Democratic | Sam Bonar Free DC Slate | 42,861 | 8.22 |
| Democratic | Thomas Elias Free DC Slate | 42,675 | 8.19 |
| Democratic | Jerome Hinkle Free DC Slate | 42,479 | 8.15 |
| Democratic | Charles E. Wilson Democrats United to Free DC | 41,870 | 8.03 |
| Democratic | David Sampe Free DC Slate | 41,071 | 7.88 |
| Democratic | Jordan Kagelmayer Free DC Slate | 39,721 | 7.62 |
| Democratic | John C. Green Democrats United to Free DC | 32,658 | 6.27 |
| Democratic | Dave Donaldson Democrats United to Free DC | 31,692 | 6.08 |
| Democratic | Stuart W. Anderson Democrats United to Free DC | 30,775 | 5.90 |
| Democratic | Alan Karnofsky Democrats United to Free DC | 30,143 | 5.78 |
| Democratic | Manny Geraldo Democrats United to Free DC | 29,060 | 5.58 |
| Democratic | James S. Bubar Democrats United to Free DC | 26,953 | 5.17 |
| Write-in | | 1,409 | 0.27 |
| Total votes | | 521,187 | 100.00 |

At-large committeewoman (vote for up to 7)
| Party | Candidate | Votes | % |
|---|---|---|---|
| Democratic | Aliyah McNeely Free DC Slate | 46,980 | 8.83 |
| Democratic | Samantha Davis Free DC Slate | 45,916 | 8.63 |
| Democratic | Emily Siegel Free DC Slate | 43,629 | 8.20 |
| Democratic | Sonya Joseph Free DC Slate | 43,205 | 8.12 |
| Democratic | Chioma Iwuoha Free DC Slate | 43,203 | 8.12 |
| Democratic | Tiffany Pauls Free DC Slate | 41,733 | 7.84 |
| Democratic | Lia Lake Kuduk Free DC Slate | 40,092 | 7.53 |
| Democratic | Linda L Gray Democrats United to Free DC | 39,259 | 7.38 |
| Democratic | Lisa R. Gore Democrats United to Free DC | 33,301 | 6.26 |
| Democratic | Monica Roache Democrats United to Free DC | 33,047 | 6.21 |
| Democratic | Dionna Maria Lewis Democrats United to Free DC | 32,249 | 6.08 |
| Democratic | Irene Kang Democrats United to Free DC | 31,578 | 5.93 |
| Democratic | Patricia Elwood Democrats United to Free DC | 29,827 | 5.60 |
| Democratic | Maria Patricia Corrales Democrats United to Free DC | 27,002 | 5.07 |
| Write-in | | 1,101 | 0.21 |
| Total votes | | 532,122 | 100.00 |

Ward 1 committeeman (vote for up to 2)
| Party | Candidate | Votes | % |
|---|---|---|---|
| Democratic | Ethan Arnheim Free DC Slate | 10,327 | 49.71 |
| Democratic | Alex Busbee Free DC Slate | 10,260 | 49.39 |
| Write-in | | 186 | 0.90 |
| Total votes | | 20,773 | 100.00 |

Ward 1 committeewoman (vote for up to 2)
| Party | Candidate | Votes | % |
|---|---|---|---|
| Democratic | Michelle Chappell Free DC Slate | 11,308 | 51.07 |
| Democratic | Vida Rangel Free DC Slate | 10,685 | 48.25 |
| Write-in | | 151 | 0.68 |
| Total votes | | 22,144 | 100.00 |

Ward 2 committeeman (vote for up to 2)
| Party | Candidate | Votes | % |
|---|---|---|---|
| Democratic | Steven M. McCarty Free DC Slate | 5,301 | 29.96 |
| Democratic | Keaton Dicapo Free DC Slate | 4,915 | 27.78 |
| Democratic | John Fanning Democrats United to Free DC | 3,926 | 22.19 |
| Democratic | Ben Dalley Democrats United to Free DC | 3,479 | 19.66 |
| Write-in | | 72 | 0.41 |
| Total votes | | 17,693 | 100.00 |

Ward 2 committeewoman (vote for up to 2)
| Party | Candidate | Votes | % |
|---|---|---|---|
| Democratic | Rachel Lesniak Free DC Slate | 5,558 | 31.31 |
| Democratic | Trupti J. Patel Free DC Slate | 4,793 | 27.00 |
| Democratic | Janice Ferebee Democrats United to Free DC | 3,698 | 20.78 |
| Democratic | Meg Roggensack Democrats United to Free DC | 3,668 | 20.66 |
| Write-in | | 45 | 0.25 |
| Total votes | | 17,762 | 100.00 |

Ward 3 committeeman (vote for up to 2)
| Party | Candidate | Votes | % |
|---|---|---|---|
| Democratic | Tarek Maassarani Free DC Slate | 6,728 | 29.76 |
| Democratic | Zachary Tashman Free DC Slate | 6,384 | 28.24 |
| Democratic | Kurt Vorndran Democrats United to Free DC | 5,072 | 22.44 |
| Democratic | Michael Haresign Democrats United to Free DC | 4,325 | 19.13 |
| Write-in | | 98 | 0.43 |
| Total votes | | 22,607 | 100.00 |

Ward 3 committeewoman (vote for up to 2)
| Party | Candidate | Votes | % |
|---|---|---|---|
| Democratic | Elizabeth Mitchell Free DC Slate | 8,051 | 39.34 |
| Democratic | Enicia Porter Free DC Slate | 6,515 | 31.83 |
| Democratic | Anita Beier Democrats United to Free DC | 5,778 | 28.23 |
| Write-in | | 122 | 0.60 |
| Total votes | | 20,466 | 100.00 |

Ward 4 committeeman (vote for up to 2)
| Party | Candidate | Votes | % |
|---|---|---|---|
| Democratic | Antoine M. Kirby Democrats United to Free DC | 8,211 | 27.73 |
| Democratic | Charles Burgess Free DC Slate | 8,047 | 27.18 |
| Democratic | Michael Cohen Democrats United to Free DC | 6,932 | 23.41 |
| Democratic | Slobodon Milic Free DC Slate | 6,294 | 21.26 |
| Write-in | | 126 | 0.43 |
| Total votes | | 29,610 | 100.00 |

Ward 4 committeewoman (vote for up to 2)
| Party | Candidate | Votes | % |
|---|---|---|---|
| Democratic | Brianna Gomez McGowan Free DC Slate | 9,510 | 35.07 |
| Democratic | Melissa Irby Democrats United to Free DC | 9,320 | 34.37 |
| Democratic | Corey Welcher Free DC Slate | 8,097 | 29.86 |
| Write-in | | 187 | 0.69 |
| Total votes | | 27,114 | 100.00 |

Ward 5 committeeman (vote for up to 2)
| Party | Candidate | Votes | % |
|---|---|---|---|
| Democratic | Aaron Dickerson Free DC Slate | 6,909 | 25.26 |
| Democratic | Harry Thomas Jr Democrats United to Free DC | 6,278 | 22.95 |
| Democratic | Art Lloyd Free DC Slate | 5,774 | 21.11 |
| Democratic | Timothy Thomas Democrats United to Free DC | 4,264 | 15.59 |
| Democratic | Shawn Taylor Fight for Statehood | Free D.C. | 2,913 | 10.65 |
| Democratic | John Lucio Fight for Statehood | Free D.C. | 1,099 | 4.02 |
| Write-in | | 116 | 0.42 |
| Total votes | | 27,353 | 100.00 |

Ward 5 committeewoman (vote for up to 2)
| Party | Candidate | Votes | % |
|---|---|---|---|
| Democratic | Yolanda Corbett Free DC Slate | 6,658 | 24.42 |
| Democratic | Shealia D. Tyson Free DC Slate | 6,033 | 22.12 |
| Democratic | Angel Alston Johnson Democrats United to Free DC | 5,490 | 20.13 |
| Democratic | Cierra Craig Democrats United to Free DC | 4,638 | 17.01 |
| Democratic | Hazel Bland Thomas Fight for Statehood | Free D.C. | 2,315 | 8.49 |
| Democratic | Ana Rodriguez Fight for Statehood | Free D.C. | 2,046 | 7.50 |
| Write-in | | 89 | 0.33 |
| Total votes | | 27,269 | 100.00 |

Ward 6 committeeman (vote for up to 2)
| Party | Candidate | Votes | % |
|---|---|---|---|
| Democratic | Paul Spires Free DC Slate | 10,211 | 52.76 |
| Democratic | Avram Reisman Free DC Slate | 8,923 | 46.10 |
| Write-in | | 220 | 1.14 |
| Total votes | | | 100.00 |

Ward 6 committeewoman (vote for up to 2)
| Party | Candidate | Votes | % |
|---|---|---|---|
| Democratic | Lauren Kuritz Free DC Slate | 8,332 | 37.35 |
| Democratic | Daraja Carroll Free DC Slate | 7,449 | 33.40 |
| Democratic | Dorinda White Democrats United to Free DC | 6,406 | 28.72 |
| Write-in | | 118 | 0.53 |
| Total votes | | | 100.00 |

Ward 7 committeeman (vote for up to 2)
| Party | Candidate | Votes | % |
|---|---|---|---|
| Democratic | Jimmie Williams Democrats United to Free DC | 5,307 | 27.78 |
| Democratic | Victor Horton Democrats United to Free DC | 5,175 | 27.08 |
| Democratic | Corey Shaw Jr Free DC Slate | 4,983 | 26.08 |
| Democratic | Dia King Free DC Slate | 3,520 | 18.42 |
| Write-in | | 122 | 0.64 |
| Total votes | | | 100.00 |

Ward 7 committeewoman (vote for up to 2)
| Party | Candidate | Votes | % |
|---|---|---|---|
| Democratic | Kenyatta M. Smith Free DC Slate | 5,929 | 30.76 |
| Democratic | Ashley R. Ruff Democrats United to Free DC | 5,140 | 26.66 |
| Democratic | Patricia Stamper Democrats United to Free DC | 4,798 | 24.89 |
| Democratic | Sonya T. Waterhouse Free DC Slate | 3,301 | 17.12 |
| Write-in | | 109 | 0.57 |
| Total votes | | | 100.00 |

Ward 8 committeeman (vote for up to 2)
| Party | Candidate | Votes | % |
|---|---|---|---|
| Democratic | Salim Adofo | 3,166 | 26.94 |
| Democratic | Kelly Mikel Williams Democrats United to Free DC | 2,900 | 24.67 |
| Democratic | Michael I. Watts, Jr. Democrats United to Free DC | 2,251 | 19.15 |
| Democratic | Travon Hawkins Act Now DC | 1,411 | 12.00 |
| Democratic | Alejaibra Sloan Free DC Slate | 1,071 | 9.11 |
| Democratic | Joseph Johnson Act Now DC | 859 | 7.31 |
| Write-in | | 96 | 0.82 |
| Total votes | | | 100.00 |

Ward 8 committeewoman (vote for up to 2)
| Party | Candidate | Votes | % |
|---|---|---|---|
| Democratic | Robin McKinney Democrats United to Free DC | 4,102 | 34.80 |
| Democratic | Regina Sharlita Pixley Democrats United to Free DC | 2,743 | 23.27 |
| Democratic | Georgette Joy Johnson Free DC Slate | 1,690 | 14.34 |
| Democratic | Charnal Chaney Free DC Slate | 1,399 | 11.87 |
| Democratic | Sandra Williams Act Now DC | 1,088 | 9.23 |
| Democratic | Robbie Woodland Act Now DC | 702 | 5.96 |
| Write-in | | 64 | 0.54 |
| Total votes | | | 100.00 |

=== National committee members ===
One man and one woman were elected as national committee members, which are considered the two highest elected positions on the committee.

National committeeman
| Party | Candidate | Votes | % |
|---|---|---|---|
| Democratic | Philip Pannell Free DC Slate | 55,173 | 51.73 |
| Democratic | David Meadows Democrats United to Free DC | 43,717 | 40.99 |
| Democratic | Mike Panetta | 7,256 | 6.80 |
| Write-in | | 505 | 0.47 |
| Total votes | | | 100.00 |

National committeewoman
| Party | Candidate | Votes | % |
|---|---|---|---|
| Democratic | Wanda D. Lockridge Democrats United to Free DC | 52,947 | 51.00 |
| Democratic | Kelsye Adams Free DC Slate | 50,242 | 48.39 |
| Write-in | | 632 | 0.61 |
| Total votes | | | 100.00 |
