= 2026 District of Columbia State Board of Education election =

- November 3, 2026

The 2026 District of Columbia State Board of Education election was held on November 3, 2026, to elect four of nine members to the District of Columbia State Board of Education.

== Ward 1 ==
=== Candidates ===
==== Declared ====
- Ben Williams, incumbent board member

=== Results ===
2026 District of Columbia State Board of Education election, ward 1
Candidate	Votes	%
Ben Williams (incumbent)	20,007	98.46
Write-in	312	1.54
Total votes	20,319	100.00

== Ward 3 ==
=== Candidates ===
==== Declared ====
- Eric Goulet, incumbent board member
- Aaron Wesolowski

=== Results ===
2026 District of Columbia State Board of Education election, ward 3
Candidate	Votes	%
Eric Goulet (incumbent)	11,649	49.94
Aaron Wesolowski	11,409	48.91
Write-in	269	1.15
Total votes	23,327	100.00

== Ward 5 ==
=== Candidates ===
==== Declared ====
- Jon Alfuth
- Lynn Jennings, educator

=== Results ===
2026 District of Columbia State Board of Education election, ward 5
Candidate	Votes	%
Lynn Jennings	18,017	76.53
Jon Alfuth	5,269	22.38
Write-in	257	1.09
Total votes	23,543	100.00

== Ward 6 ==
As more than two candidates filed to run, this election will be conducted using ranked-choice voting.

=== Candidates ===
==== Declared ====
- David Parker
- Joshua Wiley, assistant principal and candidate for this seat in 2022
- Amber Williams, education policy professional

=== Results ===
2026 District of Columbia State Board of Education election, ward 6
Candidate	Votes	%
Amber Williams	13,673	57.74
Joshua Wiley	6,607	27.90
David Parker	3,025	12.78
Write-in	374	1.58
Total votes	23,679	100.00
