= Douglas Rae =

Douglas Rae may refer to:

- Douglas Rae (producer) (born 1947), Scottish film and television producer and executive
- Douglas Rae (businessman) (1931–2018), Scottish businessman
- Douglas W. Rae (born 1939), professor of management and political science at Yale University

== See also ==
- Doug Rea (born 1948), Australian musician
