= Micromega rule =

Preferences of political parties for electoral systems

In voting theory, the micromega rule holds that, when political parties choose electoral systems, "the large prefer the small and the small prefer the large". The term "micromega" references Micromégas, a tale by Voltaire in which dwarfs and giants dialogue.

== Party preferences ==
For electoral rules, it is postulated that a few large parties tend to prefer small assemblies, small district magnitudes (the smallest being one), and rules based on small quotas of votes for allocating seats (the smallest being simple plurality, which does not require any specific threshold), while multiple small parties tend to prefer large assemblies, large district magnitudes, and large quotas (like those of proportional representation: within proportional representation systems, given the same number of seats, systems with a higher quota such as Hare or Sainte-Laguë favour smaller parties, while systems with a lower quota such as Droop or D'Hondt favour larger parties). Large parties may prefer small institutions in order to exclude others from competition, while small parties prefer large institutions able to include them within. More specifically, political configurations in which there is a single dominant party or two rather balanced parties tend to produce choices in favor of rather restrictive or exclusionary electoral systems, such as those based on plurality rule in single-member districts, while settings with multiple parties tend to support choices in favor of more inclusive electoral formulas, such as those using rules of proportional representation.

== In comparison with Duverger's laws ==
This has been seen as an upside-down reading of Duverger's laws holding that a plurality rule election systems tend to favor a two-party system, while proportional representation tends to multipartism. By suggesting, in contrast, that electoral systems are an effect of party systems rather than a cause, it has been shown that changes from a plurality system to a proportional system are typically preceded by the emergence of more than two parties, and are typically not followed by a substantial increase in the number of parties. Existing parties tend, thus, to choose electoral systems that are able to crystallize or consolidate the previously existing party configurations and systems. More generally, electoral systems and other prominent political institutions can be seen as a consequence of already existing political party systems in assemblies and governments, each of which tends to prefer those institutional formulas and procedures that can consolidate, reinforce or increase their relative strength.

== Calculating assembly size ==
Inspired by the micromega rule, Rein Taagepera presented the seat product model, which predicts the effective number of parties in the system as a function of the assembly size and average district magnitude. As he acknowledges, the relationship between party systems and electoral systems accepts two-direction lines of causality. A relevant implication of Taagepera's equation for political practitioners of institutional design is that if the size of the assembly is rather stable and depends on the country's size, for a small country with a small assembly just a few parties can be sufficient to produce a change of electoral system in favor of proportional representation, while, for a large country and a large assembly, many parties would be necessary to produce such a result.

== See also ==
- Duverger's law
- Voting systems
