= Electoral district =

Representative subdivisions

An electoral district, sometimes called a constituency, riding, circumscription, electorate, or ward, is a geographical portion of a political unit, such as a country, state or province, city, or administrative region, created to provide the voters therein with representation in a legislature or other polity. That legislative body, the state's constitution, or a body established for that purpose determines each district's boundaries and whether each will be represented by a single member or multiple members. Whereas a districts forms a single electorate, subdivisions of such an area include electoral precincts and polling stations.

Generally, only voters (constituents) who reside within the district are permitted to vote in an election held there. The district representative or representatives may be elected by single-winner first-past-the-post system, a multi-winner proportional representative system, or another voting method. The district members may be selected by a direct election under wide adult enfranchisement, an indirect election, or direct election using another form of suffrage.

== Terminology ==
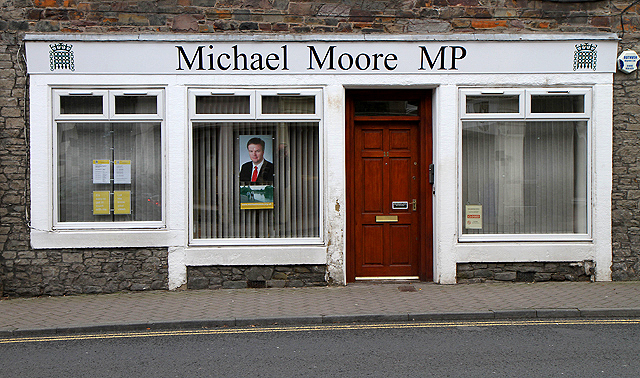
National and supranational representatives from electoral districts typically have offices in their respective districts. This photo shows the office of a Member of Parliament in the United Kingdom.

The names for electoral districts vary across countries and, occasionally, for the office being elected. The term constituency is commonly used to refer to an electoral district, especially in British English, but it can also refer to the body of eligible voters or all the residents of the represented area or only those who voted for a certain candidate.

In American English, the term congressional district is used. The term "congressional district" is largely used in the United States and is distinctive from legislative districts. In the United States, congressional districts were inscribed into the Constitution to ensure representation based on population. Conversely, state legislation declares that "legislative representation be (built upon) non-population related principles such as representation of counties, cities, or other geographical and political unit".

In Canadian English, the term electoral district is used officially, but they are colloquially known as a riding or constituency. In some parts of Canada, constituency is used for provincial districts and riding for federal districts. In colloquial Canadian French, they are called comtés ("counties"), while circonscriptions comtés is the legal term. In Australian and New Zealand English, electoral districts are called electorates, while the term electorate refers to the entire body of voters.

In India, electoral districts are referred to as "nirvācan kṣetra" (Hindi: निर्वाचन क्षेत्र) in Hindi, which can be translated to English as "electoral area" though the official English translation for the term is "constituency". The term nirvācan kṣetra is used while referring to an electoral district in general irrespective of the legislature. When referring to a particular legislative constituency, it is simply referred to as kṣetra along with the name of the legislature, in Hindi (e.g. Lok Sabha Kshetra for a Lok Sabha constituency). Electoral districts for municipal or other local bodies are called "wards". Local electoral districts are sometimes called wards, a term also used for administrative subdivisions of a municipality. However, in the Republic of Ireland, voting districts are called local electoral areas.

== District magnitude ==
District magnitude refers to the number of seats assigned to each district, and in conjunction with number of districts, determines the number of district seats to be filled in an election. Staggered terms are sometimes used to reduce the number of seats up for election at any one time, when district magnitude is more than one.

The term "district magnitude" was first used by the American political scientist Douglas W. Rae in his 1967 dissertation The Political Consequences of Electoral Laws.

To have a higher district magnitude, either a legislative chamber needs to contain more members or the voters thereof needs to be divided into fewer, larger districts.

The district magnitude affects the ease or difficulty to be elected, as the effective threshold, or de facto threshold, decreases as the district magnitude increases in multi-member districts and plural districts. The number of votes that a candidate requires to be elected is smaller when a district elects more members. However that effect is dampened when the district uses a non-proportional or landslide-prone election system such as general ticket voting and plurality block voting. Where multi-member districts are used, threshold de facto stays high if seats are filled by general ticket or other pro-landslide party block system, although this is rarely used nationwide.

Duverger drew a correlation between proportional representation in multi-member districts and the number of parties (fragmentation). The results produced by different district magnitudes supports Duverger's observation that single-winner contests tend to produce two-party systems, and proportional representation (PR) methods tend to produce multi-party systems. However, some PR systems when used in small-sized multi-member constituencies, of DM of less than 5 for example, sometimes produce a small number of effective parties. Malta diverges from Duverger's rule. It uses DM-5 districts and has a two-party system.

Even first past the post election systems can produce multi-party legislatures. In Canada and several other countries, elections that use first-past-the-post system election system sometimes elect members of five different parties due to local conditions in the multitude of separate micro-battles across a country.

Contests with district magnitude of 1 mostly use plurality voting in single-member districts (first-past-the-post voting) but instant-runoff voting or the two-round system is used in other cases. In both systems each voter has one vote in the round of voting.

District magnitude is larger than 1 where multiple members are elected (plural districts), and such districts have available a wide variety of election methods. Such districts usually use one of these systems: plurality block voting (where voter may cast as many votes as the number of seats to be filled), list proportional representation, single transferable vote elections (where each voter casts just one transferable vote). Limited voting and single non-transferable vote are used less often. In other cases, each seat in the multi-seat district is filled through a separate contest, usually through first-past-the-post. Canada's Prince Edward Island elected all its members using the post/seat system and first past the post for many decades. Another Canadian province, British Columbia, used instant-runoff voting and the seat/post system in multi-member districts in the early 1950s.

In list PR systems, district magnitude may exceed 100, but in many cases the average district magnitude under list PR is only about 14. In elections under single transferable vote systems, district magnitude normally ranges from 2 to 10 members in a district. Sometimes STV uses a greater district magnitude than that. Examples are at-large optional preferential elections in New South Wales Legislative Council (district magnitude of 21) and the 2025 Western Australian Legislative Council (district magnitude of 37).

District magnitude is maximized where:

- jurisdictions with a single electoral district for the whole elected body (at-large voting). This includes the legislatures of: the Netherlands (1 district for population 13 million and 150 seats), Serbia (7 million, 250 seats), Israel (10 million, 120 seats), Slovakia (4 million, 150 seats), and Moldova (3 million, 101 seats). In each of these cases, it takes less than a percentage point of the nation's electorate to capture a seat.
- systems use a two-tier form of party-list proportional representation, using both local multi-member constituencies (of various district magnitudes and seat-to-vote ratios), and national levelling seats where parties' nationwide vote tallies have priority (Mixed-Member Proportional). That is the case in Scandinavia: Sweden (population 6.5 million, 349 seats, 29 districts, see national apportionment of MP seats in the Riksdag article), Denmark (4 million, 179 seats, 12 districts), Norway (4 million, 169 seats, 19 districts), and Iceland (0.2 million, 63 seats, six districts).
- systems use a two-tier form of party-list proportional representation, using both local single-member districts, and national levelling seats, when the parties' nationwide vote tallies have priority (Mixed-Member Proportional). New Zealand uses such an MMP system.
- systems use a three-tier form of party-list proportional representation, using both local single-member districts, and state and national levelling seats, to produce proportional representation in each state and nationwide based on party votes cast by voters (Mixed-Member Proportional). From 2017 to 2023, in elections of Germany's Bundestag, additional members were allocated to make up for overhang seat won by parties and parties were allowed to win single-member-district seats even if not proportionally due them. After 2023, a party is allowed to take only as many seats as its proportion of the second vote (party vote) allows. If it elects too many single-member-district seats, they are disallowed, and the seats are allocated to another party.

DM is moderate where many districts break up the electorate or where relatively few members overall are elected, even if the election is held at-large. District magnitude may be set at an equal number of seats in each district. Examples include: all districts of the Northern Ireland Assembly elect 5 members (6 members prior to 2017); all those of the Parliament of Malta elect 5 MPs; all those of the Welsh Assembly elect 6. Chile, between 1989 and 2013, used a method called binomial voting, which assigned 2 MPs to each district. Most countries that use proportional representation use multi-member constituencies correspond to already existing jurisdictions (regions, districts, wards, cities, counties, states or provinces), which creates differences in district magnitude from district to district:

- Republic of Ireland for the Dáil Éireann: 3-, 4-, and 5-member districts. (STV is used) (historically district magnitude in Irish districts has been as large as 8 (1921-1937).)
- Hong Kong for half of the Legislative Council of Hong Kong: 5- to 9-member districts.
- The New Hampshire House of Representatives: 1- to 10-member districts (Plurality block voting is used).
- South Africa 27 million registered voters and 400 seats (with 200 filled in nine provincial-wide districts using party lists, and 200 elected according to PR. Provincial representation in the National Assembly, elected in province-wide districts, ranges from 5 seats in the Northern Cape to 48 seats in Gauteng.

Where districts have the same vote-to-member ratio, the number of votes needed to be elected are very similar district to district, irrespective of the district magnitude in the district. Proportional representation in a district elects multiple members who represent a variety of opinion, and therefore relatively few votes are wasted. To further avoid the waste of votes, transferable ranked votes are used in addition to the election of multiple members. A quota, a set proportion of votes as a minimum, assures the election of a candidate and allows surplus votes to go to where they might be useful. In such elections, a large proportion of votes are used to elect someone. The quota is often set as the inverse of the district magnitude plus one, plus one, the Droop quota. Droop is the mathematical minimum whereby no more can achieve quota than there are seats to be filled. Such calculation is rendered un-necessary if even one vote is exhausted or rejected during the count process, in which case an even lower quota might be equally justifiable.

In a STV contest, a candidate that accrues a Droop quota of votes is immediately declared elected. STV is intended to avoid waste of votes as much as possible by the use of multi-member districts and transferable votes. The benefit of transferable votes may be dulled if the STV system limits the number of candidates the voter can rank. If so, some votes are found to be exhausted, when they cannot be transferred even if the candidate is elected or declared defeated or un-electable. Thus it is common for one or two members in a district to be elected without attaining Droop, but still they are seen to be the most-popular at that point in the count.

Where party list PR is used, the Hare quota (the natural electoral threshold) is often used. For instance, in a system that uses party vote tallies to allocate seats, a party with ten percent of the vote in a district will win a seat in a 10-member district as its 10 percent of the vote means it is due one seat of the ten. The threshold of ten percent in a ten-seat district is equivalent to a Hare quota. However, if districts are drawn so that the party does not have 20 percent of the votes in a five-seat district, then it would not win a seat. Under PR, district magnitude determines the percentage of district votes required to win a seat, but if districts have about the same votes to seat ratio, the number of votes needed to win a seat is about the same under any district magnitude, roughly the Hare quota of the overall votes.

In systems where a noticeable number of votes are wasted, such as Single non-transferable voting or first past the post voting, or Instant-runoff voting, especially if voters are prohibited from ranking all candidates, candidates may win with less than Hare or less even than Droop. Larger district magnitudes means larger districts, so reduces disproportional variation among districts and gerrymandering. Gerrymandering is the practice of partisan redistricting by means of creating imbalances in the make-up of the district map, made easier by a multitude of micro-small districts. A larger district magnitude also means fewer wasted votes. As well, a fair voting system in the district contests also means that gerrymandering is ineffective because each party gets its fair share of seats however districts are drawn, at least theoretically. Multiple-member contests sometimes use plurality block voting, which allows the single largest group to take all the district seats. Each voter having just one vote in a multi-member district, Single voting, a component of most party-list proportional representation methods as well as single non-transferable vote and single transferable vote, prevents such a landslide.

District maginude is one of two components of the seat product model of electoral system effects.

=== Minorities ===
Large district magnitude assists in the inclusion of minorities. Single-winner plurality elections (and other elections with lower district magnitudes) are known to limit the representation of minorities. In the mid-19th century, John Stuart Mill endorsed proportional representation (PR) and STV precisely due to this shortcoming. In systems with smaller district magnitudes, various mechanisms have been employed to enhance the representation of demographic minorities. For example, gender quotas are used in some jurisdictions to ensure a minimum level of female representation. These quotas may require political parties to nominate a certain proportion of women candidates in single-member districts, or to structure party lists in a "zippered" or gender-balanced manner in multi-member districts. Such quotas can be mandated by law or adopted voluntarily by political parties, as in the case of the UK Labour Party, which has implemented all-women shortlists since 1995.

Ethnic minority representation is also addressed through institutional design in several countries. In Singapore, the Group Representation Constituency system mandates that each electoral team includes at least one member from a minority racial group. In the United States, the Supreme Court has interpreted the Voting Rights Act to require the creation of minority-majority districts where feasible, ensuring that minority populations have a fair opportunity to elect representatives of their choice. This requirement is implicit and arises from judicial interpretations of anti-discrimination principles in electoral zoning. In New Zealand, Māori electorates have existed since the 19th century, allowing voters of Māori descent to elect their own representatives. Unlike the U.S. system, these electorates explicitly distinguish between ethnic groups and often overlap with general electorates.

Large district magnitudes increase the chance for diverse walks of life and minority groups to be elected. However, it is not synonymous with proportional representation. If a district allocates seats based on "general ticket voting", it prevents the district's multiple members from being mixed and balanced. Where list PR is used in the district, a closed list PR method gives the party machine, not the voters, the power to arrange the candidates on the party list. In this case, a large district magnitude helps minorities only if the party machine of any party chooses to include them or if the minority group has its own party. In a multi-member district where general ticket voting is not used, there is a natural impetus for a party to open itself to minority voters, if they have enough numbers to be significant, due to the competitive environment produced by the electoral system.

== Apportionment and redistricting ==
Apportionment is the process of allocating a number of representatives to different regions, such as states or provinces. Apportionment changes are often accompanied by redistricting, the redrawing of electoral district boundaries to accommodate the new number of representatives. This redrawing is necessary under single-member district systems, as each new representative requires their own district. In multi-member district systems, district boundaries do not have to redrawn when allocating a fair number of seats to a geographical area. Ireland, for example, redraws its electoral districts after every census and also adjusts the number of seats in districts periodically, while Belgium uses its existing administrative boundaries for electoral districts and instead only modifies the number of seats allotted to each. Israel and the Netherlands are among the few countries that avoid the need for apportionment entirely by electing legislators at-large.

Apportionment is the process by which seats in a congressional body are allocated amongst voters entitled to representation such that each area receives seats in proportion to its population. It is generally done on the basis of population. Apportionment aims to fairly represent all voters through the use of the same ratio of voters to member. However this is often difficult as the limited number of seats creates a "stepped" mathematical progression; governments are unable to know the number of voters in an area. In addition, the resulting fairness is not as complete as it might be - voter turnout varies from district to district on election day. Seats in the United States House of Representatives, for instance, are reapportioned to individual states every 10 years following a census, with some states that have grown in population gaining seats.

By contrast, seats in the Cantonal Council of Zürich are reapportioned in every election based on the number of votes cast in each district, which is only made possible by use of multi-member districts. It would be impossible to redraw districts that often.

Malapportionment occurs when a district is under- or over-represented, as measured by the voter per seat ratio, either through districts of the same district magnitude having more or less voters, or varying district magnitude with looser reference to the number of voters. In some places, geographical area is allowed to affect apportionment on purpose. Rural areas with sparse populations are allowed to have fewer voters per seat, for example, in Iceland, the Falkland Islands and the Scottish islands, and (partly) in US Senate elections. By contrast, seats in the House of Peoples of Bosnia and Herzegovina are apportioned without regard to population; the three major ethnic groups – Bosniaks, Serbs, and Croats – each get five members, even though they have different numbers of voters.

Delimitation or redistricting is the process of drawing congressional boundaries and can also refer to the demarcation of voting areas for the purpose of assigning voters to polling places. Delimiting is a common process in nations with first-past-the-post systems, two-round systems, alternative vote, block vote, parallel and mixed-member proportional systems and single-member districts. Nations without these processes typically have proportional representation electoral systems, such as Chile, Honduras, Norway, Spain, and many others. The methodological framework that governs these processes is integral in administering fair and sovereign judicial systems for nations with delimitation processes. Manipulation of this framework often results in gerrymandering, the practice of drawing district boundaries to achieve political advantage for legislators.

=== Gerrymandering ===
Gerrymandering is the manipulation of electoral district boundaries for political gain. By creating a few "forfeit" districts where opposing candidates win overwhelmingly, gerrymandering politicians can manufacture more, but narrower, wins for themselves and their party. Gerrymandering relies on the wasted-vote effect, effectively producing wasted votes among opponents of the government while minimizing wasted votes among supporters. Gerrymandering is typically done under voting systems using single-member districts, which have more wasted votes.

While much more difficult, gerrymandering can also be done under proportional-voting systems when districts elect very few seats. By making three-member districts in regions where a particular group has a slight majority, for instance, gerrymandering politicians can obtain 2/3 of that district's seats. Similarly, by making four-member districts in regions where the same group has slightly less than a majority, gerrymandering politicians can still secure exactly half of the seats; however, any possible gerrymandering that theoretically could occur would be much less effective because minority groups can still elect at least one representative if they make up a significant percentage of the population (e.g. 20–25%), compared to single-member districts where 40–49% of the voters can be essentially shut out from any representation.

== Swing seats and safe seats ==
Sometimes, particularly under non-proportional or winner-takes-all voting systems, elections can be prone to landslide victories. As the result in each district is not related to votes cast elsewhere and may not reflect a party's national popularity, a candidate can often be elected with the support of only a minority of votes, leaving the majority of votes cast wasted, and thus a moderate winning vote of say just 34 percent repeated in several swing seats can be enough to create a landslide increase in seats won by a government.

The district-by-district basis of 'First past the post voting' elections means that parties will usually categorize and target various districts by whether they are likely to be held with ease, or winnable by extra campaigning, or written off as a foregone loss hardly worth fighting for. A safe seat is one that is regarded as very unlikely to be won by a rival politician based on the constituency's past voting record or polling results. Conversely, a marginal seat or swing seat is one that could easily swing either way, and may even have changed hands frequently in recent decades - the party that currently holds it may have only won it by a slender margin and a party that wants to win it may be able to take it away from its present holder with little effort. In United Kingdom general elections and United States presidential and congressional elections, the voting in a relatively small number of swing seats usually determines the outcome of the entire election. Parties aspire to hold as many safe seats as possible, and high-level politicians, such as prime ministers, prefer to stand in safe seats.

In large multi-party systems like India, a small shift in election results, sometimes caused by swing votes, can lead to no party taking a majority of seats, causing a hung assembly. This may arise from a significant number of seats going to smaller regional parties instead of the larger national parties which are the main competitors at the national or state level, as was the situation in the Lok Sabha (Lower house of the Parliament of India) during the 1990s.

== Constituency work ==
Elected representatives may spend much of the time serving the needs or demands of individual constituents, meaning either voters or residents of their district, and often receive an electoral advantage because of it. This is more common in assemblies with many single-member or small districts than those with fewer, larger districts. In a looser sense, corporations and other such organizations can be referred to as constituents, if they have a significant presence in an area. Many assemblies allow free postage (through franking privilege or prepaid envelopes) from a representative to a constituent, and often free telecommunications. Caseworkers may be employed by representatives to assist constituents with problems. Members of the U.S. Congress (both Representatives and Senators) working in Washington, D.C., have a governmentally staffed district office to aid in constituent services. Many state legislatures have followed suit. Likewise, British MPs use their Parliamentary staffing allowance to appoint staff for constituency casework. Client politics and pork barrel politics are associated with constituency work.

== Special constituencies with additional membership requirements ==
In some assemblies, constituencies are defined not only by geography but also by criteria such as ethnicity, professional qualification, or residence abroad. Ethnically based examples include the communal constituencies once used in Fiji, the reserved seats in India for Anglo-Indians and for members of the scheduled castes and scheduled tribes, and the Māori electorates in New Zealand. Other systems have created constituencies based on qualifications, such as the university constituencies in Ireland and, historically, in the United Kingdom, or the functional constituency. Some countries also provide representation for citizens living overseas, as in the Overseas constituencies established for French and Italian nationals residing abroad.

== Voting without constituencies ==
Not all democratic political systems use separate districts or other electoral subdivisions to conduct elections. Members are not said to represent a sub-part of the electorate. Israel, for instance, conducts parliamentary elections as a single country-wide district. The 26 electoral districts in Italy and the 20 in the Netherlands have a role in the election, but no role whatsoever in the division of the seats. Ukraine elected half of the Verkhovna Rada (the Ukrainian Parliament) in this way in the elections in October 2012.

== See also ==
- Plural district – Multi-member electoral district
- United Kingdom constituencies – Various types of electoral area in the UK
