= Two-party system =

Government system dominated by only two major political parties

A two-party system is a political party system in which two major political parties (Note: In Australian politics, there are not two political parties but rather "two major political groupings"; for further information, see the Australian Coalition.) consistently dominate the political landscape. At any point in time, one of the two parties typically holds a majority in the legislature and is usually referred to as the majority or governing party while the other is the minority or opposition party. Around the world, the term is used to refer to one of two kinds of party systems. Both result from Duverger's law, which demonstrates that "winner-take-all" or "first-past-the-post" elections produce two dominant parties over time.

The first type of two-party system is an arrangement in which all (or nearly all) elected officials belong to one of two major parties. In such systems, minor or third parties rarely win any seats in the legislature. Such systems exist, for example, in the United States, the Bahamas, Jamaica, and Zimbabwe. In such systems, while chances for third-party candidates winning election to major national office are remote, it is possible for factions within the larger parties to exert influence on one or even both of the two major parties.

Two-party system also indicates an arrangement, common in parliamentary systems, in which two major parties dominate elections, but in which there are viable minor parties and/or independents regularly elected to the legislature. These successful minor parties are often regional parties. In these systems, the two major parties exert proportionately greater influence than their percentage of voters would suggest, and other parties may frequently win election to local or subnational office. Canada, the United Kingdom, Australia, and New Zealand are examples of countries that have this kind of two-party system.

== Africa ==
=== Ghana ===
The Republic of Ghana since its transition to democracy in 1992 have a strongly institutionalized two-party system led by New Patriotic Party and National Democratic Congress.

=== Zimbabwe ===
The politics of Zimbabwe are effectively a two-party system between the Robert Mugabe founded Zimbabwe African National Union-Patriotic Front and the opposition coalition Movement for Democratic Change.

== Asia ==
=== Bhutan ===
Bhutan has a unique, constitutionally mandated two-party system. According to Article 15 of the Constitution of Bhutan, parliamentary elections are conducted in two rounds. In the primary round, all registered political parties participate. However, only the top two political parties with the highest number of votes nationwide are permitted to advance to the general election to contest seats in the National Assembly. This electoral design effectively guarantees a two-party composition in the legislature after every election cycle.

=== Lebanon ===
The Parliament of Lebanon is mainly made up of two bipartisan alliances. Although both alliances are made up of several political parties on both ends of the political spectrum the two-way political situation has mainly arisen due to strong ideological differences in the electorate. Once again this can mainly be attributed to the winner takes all thesis.

=== Philippines ===
From 1946 to 1972, the Philippines was under a two-party system with the Liberal Party and the Nacionalista Party, with these two parties supplying all presidents and vice presidents, most members of Congress, and local officials.

With the declaration of martial law in 1972, the Kilusang Bagong Lipunan emerged as the dominant party, until its overthrow after the People Power Revolution in 1986. With the approval of the 1987 constitution, the Philippines is now on a multi-party system.

=== South Korea ===
South Korea has a multi-party system that has sometimes been described as having characteristics of a two-party system. Parties will have reconstructions based upon its leader, but the country continues to maintain two major parties. Currently these parties are the liberal Democratic Party of Korea and the conservative People Power Party.

== Australia ==
=== House of Representatives ===
Since the 1920s, the Australian House of Representatives (and thus the federal government) has in effect been a two-party system.

Since the end of World War II, Australia's House of Representatives has been dominated by two factions:

- the centre-left Australian Labor Party
- the centre-right Coalition

The Coalition has been in government about two-thirds of time, broken by four periods of Labor governments: 1972–1975, 1983–1996, 2007–2013, and since 2022.

The ALP is Australia's largest and oldest continuing political party, formed in 1891 from the Australian labour movement. The party has branches in every state and territory.

The Coalition refers to the alliance between the Liberal Party of Australia (Australia's 2nd largest party) and National Party of Australia (4th largest). It was formed after the 1922 Australian federal election, when the Nationalist Party (ancestor of today's Liberal Party) lost its absolute majority, and was only able to remain in government by allying with the Country Party (now called the National Party). Under the Coalition agreement, if the Coalition forms government then the Prime Minister will be the leader of the Liberals, and the Deputy Prime Minister will be the leader of the Nationals. In theory, disagreements between the Coalition's constituent parties would lead to the Coalition splitting apart. This has happened only a few times in Australia's modern political history, and has always resulted in the Coalition coming back together by the next election. The most recent splits occurred in 2025, following Labor's landslide victory at that year's election, and in 2026, after three National Party members broke party solidarity in opposing the government's hate speech reforms, following the 2025 shooting at Bondi Beach.

One reason for Australia's two-party system is because the House of Representatives (which chooses the Prime Minister of Australia) is elected through the instant-runoff voting electoral system. Although voters can preference third parties and independents above the major parties, and the voting method has a reduced spoiler effect, there is still only one member per electoral division (ie: a winner-take-all system) and so major parties tend to win the vast majority of seats even if they need to rely on preferences to do so. For example, a Labor candidate may win a seat with 30% of the vote for Labor and 21% from Australian Greens voters who ranked Labor second.

=== Senate ===
On the other hand, the Australian Senate is effectively a multi-party system, and a Senate majority matching the House is very rare. It uses single transferable vote with multiple Senators for each state/territory. This results in rough proportional representation and as a result, third parties have much more influence and often hold the balance of power. Since 2004, the Australian Greens have been the third largest party in the country, with 8-13% of the national vote and an equivalent amount of Senators. Prior to this, the Australian Democrats was the third largest party. Other current and past parties include One Nation, the Liberal Democrats and Family First.

Some Australian states have seen the rise of minor parties at either the state or federal level (eg: Centre Alliance in South Australia, Katter's Australian Party in northern Queensland, and the Shooters, Fishers and Farmers Party in western New South Wales), while some have seen long periods of dominance by one party. Some parties are absent entirely in parts of the country.

- The Australian Capital Territory has had a Labor/Greens coalition government since 2012, opposed by the Liberals (Nationals not present). Labor was in government alone from 2001-2012.
  - Notably, the ACT is the only state/territory where the Greens have been in power.
- In the Northern Territory, the two main parties are Labor and the Country Liberal Party (CLP), which aligns with the Coalition at the federal level.
- In Western Australia, the Liberal and National parties are not in a permanent coalition at the state level. At the 2021 Western Australian state election Labor won 53 out of 59 lower house seats in a landslide victory. The National Party won 4 seats making them the official opposition. The Liberals won only 2 seats, putting them on the crossbench.
- In New South Wales and Victoria, the main parties reflect the situation nationally: Labor versus the Coalition of the Liberals and Nationals. NSW is the only state where the Coalition has never split, but has also never merged into one party.
- In South Australia and Tasmania, the main parties are Labor and the Liberals, with the Nationals not holding any seats.
- In Queensland, the main parties are Labor and the Liberal-National Party (LNP). Historically, the Country Party was the largest Coalition member and they governed the state from 1957 until 1989. This was partially due to a malapportionment which heavily favoured rural seats. It had been originally designed by a Labor government, but ended up benefitting the Country Party as demographics shifted. Later, Premier Joh Bjelke-Petersen increased his power by using Queensland Police to suppress political dissent, and enacted the Bjelkemander, worsening malapportionment in order to reduce the power of the Liberals so his Country Party could rule alone. Eventually, media reports and the Fitzgerald Inquiry revealed wide-ranging corruption police and government. Bjelke-Petersen was forced to resign in disgrace, while many high-ranking police and politicians were criminally charged. Labor has been in power for most of the time since then, with the state Country and Liberal parties merging into the LNP, which is a member of the Coalition federally.

== Europe ==
=== Germany ===
Federal elections in Germany, with rise and decline of the two strong parties CDU/CSU and SPD

Since the 1950s, (West) Germany had two very strong parties with results at 40+%, CDU/CSU and SPD representing center right and center left. Except for a short time in the 1950s, they always needed a coalition partner, which for decades was the center FDP that tipped the scales towards one or another, even changing side in mid-term, late 1982. This continued after the 1990 unification, when parties on the left side of the spectrum emerged, Greens and The Left, the former GDR communist party. With the center parties and long-time Chancellor Merkel shifting green and left in pursuit of new majorities, the opening gap on the center right was filled by AfD in the 2010s. Since, six parties were or are established on the federal level. On state level, additional parties even made it into government coalitions, FW and the new split-off BSW.

In the 2021 German federal election, 25.7% was enough for the SPD to become strongest party, with Chancellor Scholz leading a short-lived three party coalition. The decline of traditional majorities showed in one constituency of Dresden, where the two strongest parties (CDU, AfD) each won 18.6% of the vote, and four others between 11% and 15%.

In the snap 2025 German federal election, SPD dropped to third, thus the decade old two-party system was ended. As 14% of voters are not represented in the 21st Bundestag, the combined 45% vote share of Union and SPD is enough to form the CDU/CSU-SPD coalition of Chancellor Merz.

=== Malta ===
Malta is somewhat unusual in that while the electoral system is single transferable vote (STV), a form with proportional representation traditionally associated with a multi-party system, minor parties have not had much success. Politics is dominated between the centre-left Labour Party and the centre-right Nationalist Party, with no third parties winning seats in Parliament between 1962 and 2017 and since 2022.

=== Spain ===
A report in The Christian Science Monitor in 2008 suggested that Spain was moving toward a "greater two-party system" while acknowledging that Spain has many small parties. A 2015 article published by WashingtonPost.com written by academic Fernando Casal Bértoa noted the decline in support for the two main parties, the People's Party (PP) and the Spanish Socialist Workers' Party (PSOE) in recent years, with these two parties winning only 52 percent of the votes in that year's regional and local elections. He explained this as being due to the Spanish economic crisis, a series of political corruption scandals and broken campaign promises. He argued that the emergence of the new Citizens and Podemos parties would mean the political system would evolve into a two-bloc system, with an alliance of the PP and Citizens on the right facing a leftist coalition of PSOE, Podemos and the United Left. Far-right Vox party became the third largest group in the Spanish parliament in the late 2010s.

=== United Kingdom ===
In countries such as Britain, two major parties which have strong influence emerge and tend to elect most of the candidates, but a multitude of lesser parties exist with varying degrees of influence, and sometimes these lesser parties are able to elect officials who participate in the legislature. In political systems based on the Westminster system, which is a particular style of parliamentary democracy based on the British model and found in many Commonwealth countries, a majority party will form the government and the minority party will form the opposition, and coalitions of lesser parties are possible; in the rare circumstance in which neither party is the majority, a hung parliament arises. Sometimes these systems are described as two-party systems, but they are usually referred to as multi-party systems or a two-party plus system. There is not always a sharp boundary between a two-party system and a multi-party system.

The Labour Party and the Conservative Party are the two largest parties in the United Kingdom since 1922.

=== Poland ===
In Poland, the two largest parties since the 2005 election have been Civic Platform and the Law and Justice party. These two parties have dominated the political landscape, with one typically forming the government while the other serves as the main opposition. However, several smaller parties exist and often play a significant role, especially in coalition-building or in the Senate, where electoral rules are different. Poland uses a proportional representation system for the Sejm, which allows for the representation of a wider range of political parties compared to majoritarian systems, and enables coalition governments.

Despite the presence of multiple parties, the rivalry between Civic Platform and Law and Justice has defined Polish politics in the 21st century, leading many observers to describe the system as a de facto two-party system or a "two-party plus" system. The political scene is sometimes characterized by polarization between the two major camps, though shifts in public sentiment and political alliances occasionally give rise to third-party movements or temporary realignments.

While the system has not always produced single-party majorities, Law and Justice managed to secure an outright majority in the 2015 election, an uncommon occurrence under Poland’s proportional system. Civic Platform previously led coalition governments, most notably with the Polish People's Party. The political environment remains dynamic, with new parties emerging periodically, though none have yet succeeded in consistently challenging the dominance of the two leading parties.

==== Current Poland's situation ====
Since 2023 Civic Coalition holds government in coalition with Third Way and New Left.

In 2025 Polish presidential election Law and Justice backed-up candidate Karol Nawrocki won against Civic Platform candidate Rafał Trzaskowski in run-off.

== Latin America ==
Most Latin American countries also have presidential systems very similar to the US often with winner takes all systems. Due to the common accumulation of power in the presidential office both the official party and the main opposition became important political protagonists causing historically two-party systems. Some of the first manifestations of this particularity was with the liberals and conservatives that often fought for power in all Latin America causing the first two-party systems in most Latin American countries which often lead to civil wars in places like Colombia, Ecuador, Mexico, Venezuela, the Central American Republic and Peru, with fights focusing specially on opposing/defending the privileges of the Catholic Church and the creole aristocracy. Other examples of primitive two-party systems included the Pelucones versus Pipiolos in Chile, Federalists versus Unitarians in Argentina, Colorados versus Liberals in Paraguay and Colorados versus Nationals in Uruguay.

As in other regions, the original rivalry between liberals and conservatives was overtaken by a rivalry between center-left (often social-democratic) parties versus center-right liberal conservative parties, focusing more in economic differences than in cultural and religious differences as it was common during the liberal versus conservative period. Examples of this include National Liberation Party versus Social Christian Unity Party in Costa Rica, the peronista Justicialist Party versus Radical Civic Union in Argentina, Democratic Action versus COPEI in Venezuela, the Colombian Liberal Party versus the Colombian Conservative Party in Colombia, Democratic Revolutionary Party versus Panameñista Party in Panama and Liberal Party versus National Party in Honduras. After the democratization of Central America following the end of the Central American crisis in the 1990s former far-left guerrillas and former right-wing authoritarian parties, now in peace, make some similar two-party systems in countries like Nicaragua between the Sandinista National Liberation Front and the Liberals and in El Salvador between the Farabundo Martí National Liberation Front and the Nationalist Republican Alliance.

The traditional two-party dynamic started to break after a while, especially in the early 2000s; alternative parties won elections breaking the traditional two-party systems including Rafael Caldera's (National Convergence) victory in Venezuela in 1993, Álvaro Uribe (Colombia First) victory in 2002, Tabaré Vázquez (Broad Front) victory in Uruguay in 2004, Fernando Lugo (Christian Democratic Party) victory in Paraguay in 2008, Ricardo Martinelli (Democratic Change) victory in 2009 in Panama, Luis Guillermo Solís (Citizens' Action Party) victory in 2014 in Costa Rica, Mauricio Macri (Republican Proposal) victory in 2015 in Argentina, Nayib Bukele (Grand Alliance for National Unity) victory in 2019 in El Salvador, Gabriel Boric (Approve Dignity) victory in 2021 in Chile and Xiomara Castro (Liberty and Refoundation) victory in 2021 in Honduras, all of them from non-traditional third parties in their respective countries. In some countries like Argentina, Chile and Venezuela the political system is now split in two large multi-party alliances or blocs, one on the left and one on the right of the spectrum, such as Frente de Todos versus Juntos por el Cambio in Argentina, and the Unitary Platform versus Great Patriotic Pole in Venezuela.

=== Brazil ===
During the imperial period, since 1840, two great parties with a national base alternated its dominance between legislatures: the Liberal and the Conservative. These parties were dissolved in 1889, after the republic was instituted in Brazil, in which the registration of party directories came under the jurisdiction of the states.

Brazil also had a two-party system for most of its military dictatorship (1964–1985): on October 27, 1965, the Institutional Act 2 decree banned all existing parties and conditioned the creation of new parties to the quorum of 1/3 of the then-elected National Congress; resulting in the creation of two parties: a pro-government party, the National Renewal Alliance (ARENA) and an opposition party, the Brazilian Democratic Movement (MDB). Despite officially having a bipartisan system, complex electoral mechanisms, nominally neutral, were created to guarantee the prevalence of the ARENA in the National Congress, making Brazil, in practice, a dominant-party system in that period. The two parties were dissolved in 1979, when the regime allowed other parties to form.

== North America ==
=== Canada ===
Canada has a multiparty system at the federal and provincial levels. Some provinces have effectively become two-party systems in which only two parties regularly get members elected, while smaller parties largely fail to secure electoral representation, and two of the three territories are run under a non-partisan consensus government model rather than through a political party system. Two-party representation has historically been common in the legislative assemblies of British Columbia, New Brunswick and Prince Edward Island, although all did elect some third-party members in their most recent provincial elections.

The Liberal Party of Canada and the Conservative Party of Canada are the two largest parties in Canada at the federal level, and the only parties to have led a federal government are these parties or their predecessors. However, in some elections a different party from these has reached the number two position, Official Opposition, in the federal House of Commons: the Bloc Québécois in the 1993 election and the New Democratic Party in the 2011 election. Additionally, the Reform Party and its successor Canadian Alliance reached Official Opposition in the 1997 and 2000 elections respectively, and this represented an outsider-party challenge until the Canadian Alliance merged into the Conservative Party lineage in 2004.

When a two-party system exists at a provincial level, the two predominant parties are not always a provincial Liberal and Conservative party. For example, the predominant two parties in British Columbia from the 1952 to 1986 elections were the British Columbia Social Credit Party on the right and the British Columbia New Democratic Party or its direct predecessor on the left. Quebec is often largely polarized between one more firmly Quebec nationalist party (the autonomist Union Nationale or Coalition Avenir Québec, or the sovereigntist Parti Québécois), and one more federalist party (the Quebec Liberal Party).

=== Caribbean ===
The Commonwealth Caribbean while inheriting their basic political and voting system from Great Britain have become two-party systems. The politics of Jamaica are between the People's National Party and the Jamaica Labour Party. The politics of Guyana are between the People's Progressive Party and APNU which is actually a coalition of smaller parties. The politics of Trinidad and Tobago are between the People's National Movement and the United National Congress. The Politics of Belize are between the United Democratic Party and the People's United Party. The Politics of the Bahamas are between the Progressive Liberal Party and the Free National Movement. The politics of Barbados are between the Democratic Labour Party and the Barbados Labour Party.

=== United States ===
The United States today currently operates on a de-facto two party system under Republicans and Democrats and has two dominant political parties; historically, there have been few instances in which third party candidates won an election. In the First Party System, only Alexander Hamilton's Federalist Party and Thomas Jefferson's Democratic-Republican Party were significant political parties. Toward the end of the First Party System, the Democratic-Republicans were dominant (primarily under the presidency of James Monroe).

Under the Second Party System, the Democratic-Republican Party split during the 1824 United States presidential election into Adams' Men and Jackson's Men. In the 1828 presidential election, the modern Democratic Party formed in support of Andrew Jackson. The National Republicans were formed in support of John Quincy Adams. After the National Republicans collapsed, the Whig Party and the Free Soil Party quickly formed and collapsed.

In 1854, the Third Party System began when the modern Republican Party formed from a loose coalition of former Whigs, Free Soilers and other anti-slavery activists. The Republicans quickly became the dominant party nationally, and Abraham Lincoln became the first Republican President in the 1860 presidential election. The Democrats held a strong, loyal coalition in the Solid South. This period saw the American Civil War where the South (which was mostly dominated by the Southern Democrats) attempted to secede as the Confederate States of America, in an attempt to preserve racial slavery. The South lost the war and were forced to end slavery, and during the following Reconstruction Era the Republicans remained the most popular party nationally while the Democrats remained dominant in the South.

During the Fourth Party System from about 1896 to 1932, the Republicans remained the dominant presidential party, although Democrats Grover Cleveland and Woodrow Wilson were both elected to two terms (non-consecutively in the case of the former).

The 1932 United States elections saw the onset of the Fifth Party System and a long period of Democratic dominance due to the New Deal Coalition. Democrat President Franklin D. Roosevelt won landslides in four consecutive elections. Other than the two terms of Republican Dwight Eisenhower from 1953 to 1961, Democrats retained firm control of the presidency until the mid-1960s. In Congress, Democrats retained majorities in both houses for 60 years until the Republican Revolution, broken only by brief Republican majorities.

There was a significant change in U.S. politics in 1960, and this is seen by some as a transition to a sixth party system.

Since the mid-1960s, despite a couple of landslides (such as Richard Nixon carrying 49 states and 61% of the popular vote over George McGovern in 1972; Ronald Reagan carrying 49 states and 58% of the popular vote over Walter Mondale in 1984), presidential elections have been competitive between the predominant Republican and Democratic parties and no one party has been able to hold the presidency for more than three consecutive terms.

Throughout every American party system, no third party has won a presidential election or majorities in either house of Congress. Despite that, third parties and third party candidates have gained traction and support. In the election of 1912, Theodore Roosevelt won 27% of the popular vote and 88 electoral votes running as a Progressive. In the 1992 presidential election, Ross Perot won 19% of the popular vote but no electoral votes running as an independent.

Modern American politics, in particular the electoral college system, has been described as duopolistic since the Republican and Democratic parties have dominated and framed policy debate as well as the public discourse on matters of national concern for about a century and a half. Third parties have encountered various blocks in getting onto ballots at different levels of government as well as other electoral obstacles, such as denial of access to general election debates. Since 1987, the Commission on Presidential Debates, established by the Republican and Democratic parties themselves, supplanted debates run since 1976 by the League of Women Voters. The League withdrew its support in protest in 1988 over objections of alleged stagecraft such as rules for camera placement, filling the audience with supporters, approved moderators, predetermined question selection, room temperature and others. The Commission maintains its own rules for admittance and has only admitted a single third-party candidate to a televised debate, Ross Perot, in 1992.

Some parts of the US have had their own party systems, distinct from the rest of the country.

- In American Samoa, the American Samoa Fono (territorial legislature) is non-partisan, and on ballots only candidate names are displayed, not political parties. The Governor has typically been either Democrat or Republican.
- In Guam, the Popular Party was the only political party from 1949 to 1954, and was dominant until 1967 when they became affiliated with the Democrats. Since then, the Democrats and Republicans have been the two main parties.
- In the Northern Mariana Islands, the Democrats and Republicans are the two main parties but as recently as 2013, the Governor was a member of the Covenant Party.
- In Puerto Rico, there is a multi-party system with the Popular Democratic Party and New Progressive Party being the two strongest parties. Minor parties in the 2021 legislature include the Puerto Rican Independence Party, Citizens' Victory Movement and Project Dignity.
- In the US Virgin Islands, the Democrats and Republicans have been the main two parties, but two governors during the 1970s were part of the Independent Citizens Movement, and from 2015 to 2019 the governor was an independent.

== Comparison with other systems ==
Two-party systems can be contrasted with:

- Multi-party systems. In these, the effective number of parties is greater than two but usually fewer than five; in a two-party system, which is a subset of such a party system used in liberal democracies, the effective number of parties is two (according to one analysis, the actual average number of parties varies between 1.7 and 2.1). The parties in a multi-party system can control government separately or as a coalition; in a two-party system, coalition governments rarely form. Nations with multi-party systems include Belgium, Brazil, Denmark, Finland, France, Germany, Indonesia, Ireland, Israel, Italy, Mexico, Nepal, the Netherlands, New Zealand, Norway, Pakistan, Philippines, Portugal, Ukraine, Suriname, Sweden and Thailand.
- Dominant-party systems are present where a dominant party holds a vast majority for decades and the party institutions may be intertwined with, or hard to distinguish from the major institutions of the state. Unlike in one-party-states, civil rights and freedom of press may be preserved. This can occur in countries which are formally democratic (such as the case of the People's Action Party of Singapore, the African National Congress of South Africa, the Colorado Party in Paraguay, the SWAPO in Namibia, and the Dominica Labour Party in Dominica) or in countries which are only nominally democratic, where the allowance of the existence of multiple parties is merely a front to give the illusion of a democratic system (such as the case of the People's Democratic Party of Tajikistan in Tajikistan, the New Azerbaijan Party in Azerbaijan, the Democratic Party of Turkmenistan in Turkmenistan, United Russia in Russia, the Union for the Republic in Togo, the Democratic Party of Equatorial Guinea in Equatorial Guinea, and the Cameroon People's Democratic Movement in Cameroon).
- One-party systems happen in nations where no more than one party is codified in law and/or officially recognized, or where alternate parties are restricted (sometimes constitutionally) by or in favor of the dominant party which wields power. Examples are rule by the Communist Party of Vietnam and Communist Party of Cuba in the former case, and the Chinese Communist Party and Workers' Party of Korea in the latter case.

== Causes ==
There are several reasons why, in some systems, two major parties dominate the political landscape. There has been speculation that a two-party system arose in the United States from early political battling between the federalists and anti-federalists in the first few decades after the ratification of the Constitution, according to several views. In addition, there has been more speculation that the winner-takes-all electoral system as well as particular state and federal laws regarding voting procedures helped to cause a two-party system.

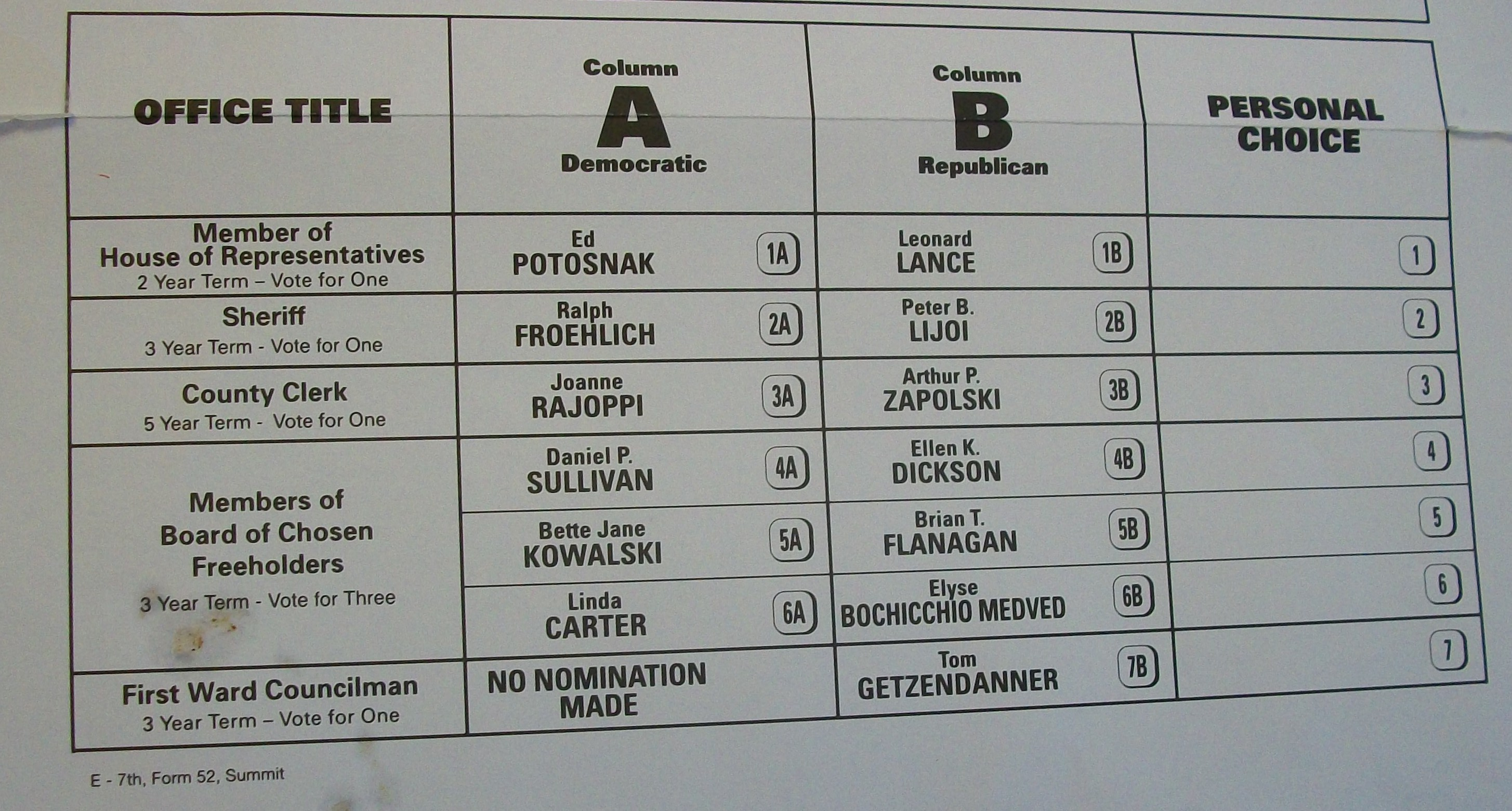
In a two-party system, voters have mostly two options; in this sample ballot for an election in Summit, New Jersey, voters can choose between a Republican or Democrat, but there are no third party candidates.

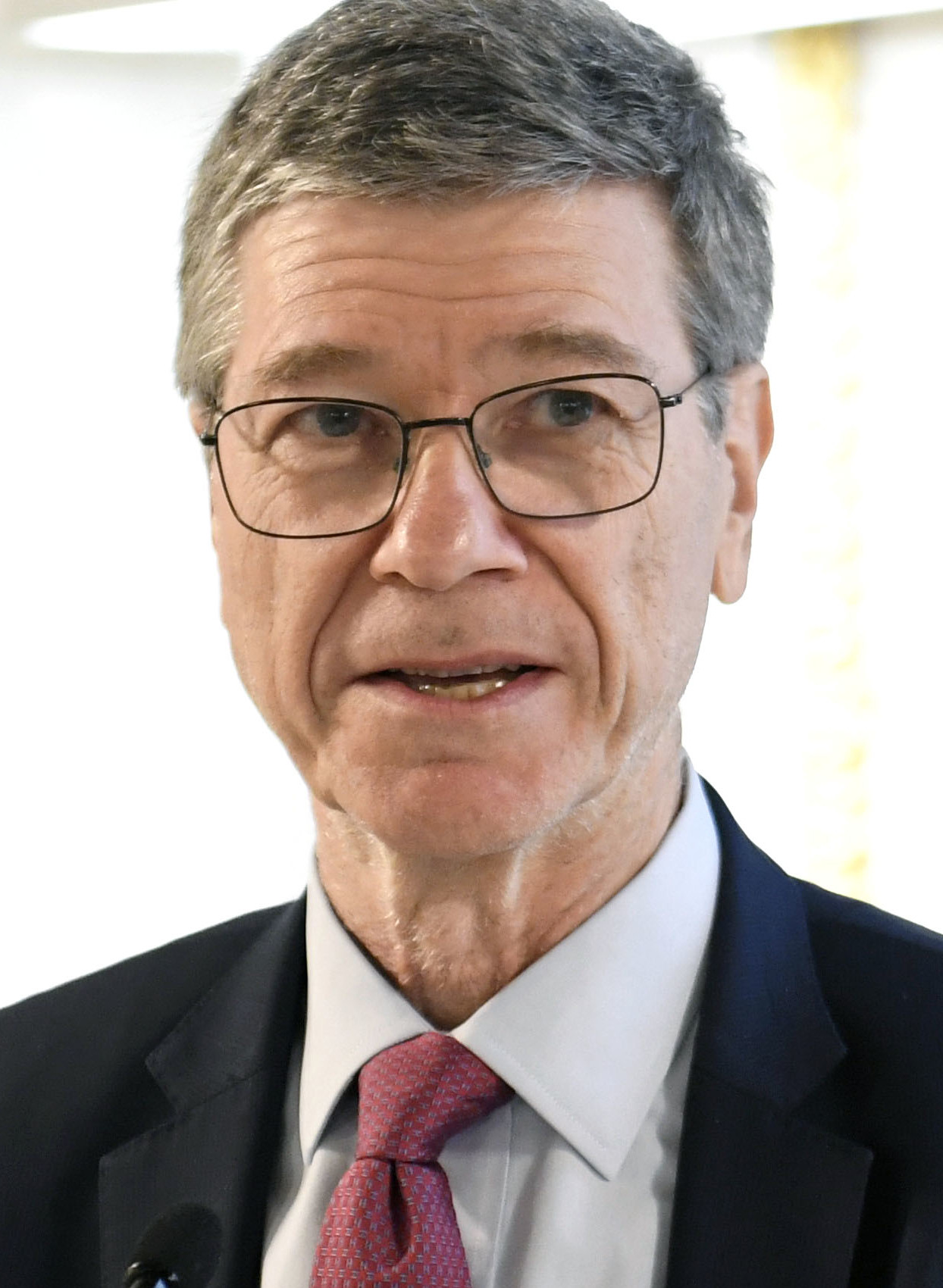
Economist Jeffrey D. Sachs

Political scientists such as Maurice Duverger and William H. Riker claim that there are strong correlations between voting rules and type of party system. Jeffrey D. Sachs agreed that there was a link between voting arrangements and the effective number of parties. Sachs explained how the first-past-the-post voting arrangement tended to promote a two-party system:

The main reason for America's majoritarian character is the electoral system for Congress. Members of Congress are elected in single-member districts according to the "first-past-the-post" (FPTP) principle, meaning that the candidate with the plurality of votes is the winner of the congressional seat. The losing party or parties win no representation at all. The first-past-the-post election tends to produce a small number of major parties, perhaps just two, a principle known in political science as Duverger's Law. Smaller parties are trampled in first-past-the-post elections.

— Sachs, The Price of Civilization, 2011

Consider a system in which voters can vote for any candidate from any one of many parties. Suppose further that if a party gets 15% of votes, then that party will win 15% of the seats in the legislature. This is termed proportional representation or more accurately as party-proportional representation. Political scientists speculate that proportional representation leads logically to multi-party systems, since it allows new parties to build a niche in the legislature:

Because even a minor party may still obtain at least a few seats in the legislature, smaller parties have a greater incentive to organize under such electoral systems than they do in the United States.

— Schmidt, Shelley, Bardes (2008)

In contrast, a voting system that allows only a single winner for each possible legislative seat is sometimes termed a single-winner voting system and is usually described under the heading of a winner-takes-all arrangement in the case of a plurality voting system. Each voter can cast a single vote for any candidate within any given legislative district, but the candidate with the most votes wins the seat, although variants, such as requiring a majority, are sometimes used. What happens is that in a general election, a party that consistently comes in third in every district is unlikely to win any legislative seats even if there is a significant proportion of the electorate favoring its positions. This arrangement strongly favors large and well-organized political parties that are able to appeal to voters in many districts and hence win many seats, and discourages smaller or regional parties. Politically oriented people consider their only realistic way to capture political power is to run under the auspices of the two dominant parties, and legislators from both dominant parties have an incentive not to reform the system as it eliminates potential choices and multiple competing policy options, meaning that they do not necessarily need to adopt positions favorable to voters, but only need to be seen as marginally less unfavorable than the only other option to gain votes.

In the U.S., forty-eight states have a standard winner-takes-all electoral system for amassing presidential votes in the Electoral College system. The winner-takes-all principle applies in presidential elections, since if a presidential candidate gets the most votes in any particular state, all of the electoral votes from that state are awarded. In all but two states, Maine and Nebraska, the presidential candidate winning a plurality of votes wins all of the electoral votes, a practice called the unit rule.

Duverger concluded that "plurality election single-ballot procedures are likely to produce two-party systems, whereas proportional representation and runoff designs encourage multipartyism." He suggested there were two reasons why winner-takes-all systems leads to a two-party system. First, the weaker parties are pressured to form an alliance, sometimes called a fusion, to try to become big enough to challenge a large dominant party and, in so doing, gain political clout in the legislature. Second, voters learn, over time, not to vote for candidates outside of one of the two large parties since their votes for third party candidates are usually ineffectual. As a result, weaker parties are eliminated by voters over time. Duverger pointed to statistics and tactics to suggest that voters tended to gravitate towards one of the two main parties, a phenomenon which he called polarization, and tend to shun third parties. For example, some analysts suggest that the Electoral College system in the United States, by favoring a system of winner-takes-all in presidential elections, is a structural choice favoring only two major parties.

Gary Cox suggested that America's two-party system was highly related with economic prosperity in the country:

The bounty of the American economy, the fluidity of American society, the remarkable unity of the American people, and, most important, the success of the American experiment have all mitigated against the emergence of large dissenting groups that would seek satisfaction of their special needs through the formation of political parties.

— Cox, according to George Edwards

However, as of 2022, United States' Gini coefficient (which measures income inequality) ranks near the worst of OECD countries and in the bottom half of all countries, while the country ranks outside the top five countries in terms of GDP per capita.

An effort in 2012 by centrist groups to promote ballot access by third-party candidates called Americans Elect spent $15 million to get ballot access but failed to elect any candidates. The lack of choice in a two-party model in politics has often been compared to the variety of choices in the marketplace.

Politics has lagged our social and business evolution ... There are 30 brands of Pringles in our local grocery store. How is it that Americans have so much selection for potato chips and only two brands – and not very good ones – for political parties?

— Scott Ehredt of the Centrist Alliance

== Third parties ==
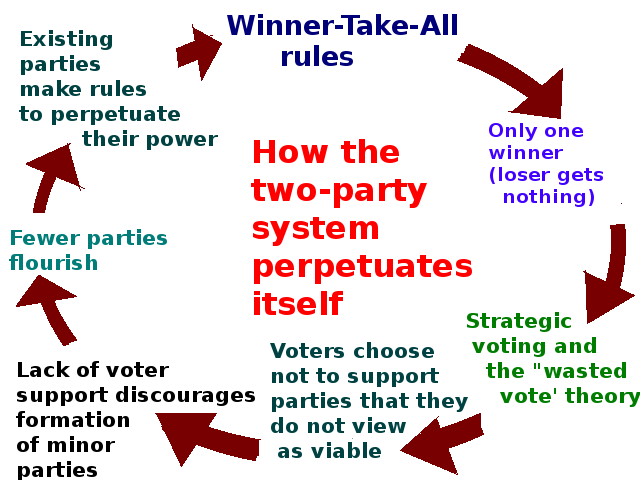
According to one view, the winner-takes-all system discourages voters from choosing third party or independent candidates, and over time the process becomes entrenched so that only two major parties become viable.

Third parties, meaning a party other than one of the two dominant parties, are possible in two-party systems, but they are often unlikely to exert much influence by gaining control of legislatures or by winning elections. While there are occasional opinions in the media expressed about the possibility of third parties emerging in the United States, for example, political insiders such as the 1980 presidential candidate John Anderson think the chances of one appearing in the early twenty-first century is remote. A report in The Guardian suggested that American politics has been "stuck in a two-way fight between Republicans and Democrats" since the Civil War, and that third-party runs had little meaningful success.

Third parties in a two-party system can be:

- Built around a particular ideology or interest group
- Split off from one of the major parties or
- Focused on a charismatic individual.
Party affiliation in the United States, in millions of registered voters, according to a 2004 study:
1. Democratic 72 (42.6%)
2. Republican 55 (32.5%)
3. Other 42 (24.9%)

When third parties are built around an ideology which is at odds with the majority mindset, many members belong to such a party not for the purpose of expecting electoral success but rather for personal or psychological reasons. In the U.S., third parties include older ones such as the Libertarian Party and the Green Party and newer ones such as the Pirate Party. Many believe that third parties do not affect American politics by winning elections, but they can act as "spoilers" by taking votes from one of the two major parties. They act like barometers of change in the political mood since they push the major parties to consider their demands. An analysis in New York Magazine by Ryan Lizza in 2006 suggested that third parties arose from time to time in the nineteenth century around single-issue movements such as abolition, women's suffrage, and the direct election of senators, but were less prominent in the twentieth century. With a fusion nomination, a candidate can appear under two separate labels, allowing voters to show support for a candidate and a party.

A so-called third party in the United Kingdom were historically the Liberal Democrats, prior to the Scottish National Party taking its place from the 2015 election until the 2024 election by number of the House of Common seats. In the 2010 election, the Liberal Democrats received 23% of the votes but only 9% of the seats in the House of Commons. While electoral results do not necessarily translate into legislative seats, the Liberal Democrats can exert influence if there is a situation such as a hung parliament. In this instance, neither of the two main parties (at present, the Conservative Party and the Labour Party) have sufficient authority to run the government. Accordingly, the Liberal Democrats can in theory exert tremendous influence in such a situation since they can ally with one of the two main parties to form a coalition. This happened in the coalition government of 2010. The two party system in the United Kingdom allows for other parties to exist, although the main two parties tend to dominate politics (for example, the aforementioned coalition government was the first multi-party government since the government of Winston Churchill in the early- to mid-1940s); in this arrangement, other parties are not excluded and can win seats in Parliament. In contrast, the two party system in the United States has been described as a duopoly or an enforced two-party system, such that politics is almost entirely dominated by either the Republicans or Democrats, and third parties rarely win seats in Congress, state legislatures, or even at the local level.

== Advantages ==
Some historians have suggested that two-party systems promote centrism and encourage political parties to find common positions which appeal to wide swaths of the electorate. It can lead to political stability, which leads, in turn, to economic growth. Historian Patrick Allitt of the Teaching Company suggested that it is difficult to overestimate the long-term economic benefits of political stability. Sometimes two-party systems have been seen as preferable to multi-party systems because they are simpler to govern, with less fractiousness and greater harmony, since it discourages radical minor parties, while multi-party systems can sometimes lead to hung parliaments. Italy, with a multi-party system, has had years of divisive politics since 2000, although analyst Silvia Aloisi suggested in 2008 that the nation may be moving closer to a two-party arrangement, although this no longer seemed the case by the 2010s, which saw the rise of the Five Star Movement and Lega. The two-party system has generally been identified as simpler since there are fewer voting choices.

== Disadvantages ==
Two-party systems have been criticized for downplaying alternative views, being less competitive, failing the median voter theorem, encouraging voter apathy since there is a perception of fewer choices, and putting a damper on debate within a nation. In a proportional representation system, lesser parties can moderate policy since they are not usually eliminated from government. One analyst suggested the two-party approach may not promote inter-party compromise but may encourage partisanship. In The Tyranny of the Two-party system, Lisa Jane Disch criticizes two-party systems for failing to provide enough options since only two choices are permitted on the ballot. She wrote:

Herein lies the central tension of the two–party doctrine. It identifies popular sovereignty with choice, and then limits choice to one party or the other. If there is any truth to Schattschneider's analogy between elections and markets, America's faith in the two–party system begs the following question: Why do voters accept as the ultimate in political freedom a binary option they would surely protest as consumers? ... This is the tyranny of the two–party system, the construct that persuades United States citizens to accept two–party contests as a condition of electoral democracy.

— Lisa Jane Disch, 2002

There have been arguments that the winner-take-all mechanism discourages independent or third-party candidates from running for office or promulgating their views. Ross Perot's former campaign manager wrote that the problem with having only two parties is that the nation loses "the ability for things to bubble up from the body politic and give voice to things that aren't being voiced by the major parties." One analyst suggested that parliamentary systems, which typically are multi-party in nature, lead to a better "centralization of policy expertise" in government. Multi-party governments permit wider and more diverse viewpoints in government, and encourage dominant parties to make deals with weaker parties to form winning coalitions. Analyst Chris Weigant of the Huffington Post wrote that "the parliamentary system is inherently much more open to minority parties getting much better representation than third parties do in the American system". After an election in which the party changes, there can be a "polar shift in policy-making" when voters react to changes.

Political analyst A. G. Roderick, writing in his book Two Tyrants, argued that the two American parties (the Republican Party and the Democratic Party) were highly unpopular (as of 2015), are not part of the political framework of state governments, and do not represent the 47% of the electorate who identify themselves as "independents". He makes a case that the American president should be elected on a non-partisan basis, and asserts that both political parties are "cut from the same cloth of corruption and corporate influence."

Others have accused two party systems of encouraging an environment which stifles individual thought processes and analysis. In a two party system, knowledge about political leaning facilitates assumptions to be made about an individual's opinions on a wide variety of topics (e.g. abortion, taxes, the space program, a viral pandemic, human sexuality, the environment, warfare, opinions on police, etc.) which are not necessarily connected.

The more destructive problem is the way this skews the discussion of the issues facing the nation. The media – meaning news sources from Fox News to The New York Times and everything in between – seem largely incapable of dealing with any issue outside of the liberal versus conservative paradigm. Whether it's dealing with ISIS, the debt ceiling, or climate change, the media frames every issue as a simple debate between the Democratic and the Republican positions. This creates the ludicrous idea that every public policy problem has two, and only two, approaches. That's nonsense. Certainly some problems have only two resolutions, some have only one, but most have a range of possible solutions. But the "national" debate presents every issue as a simplistic duality, which trivializes everything.

—Michael Coblenz, 2016

== History ==
=== British parties ===
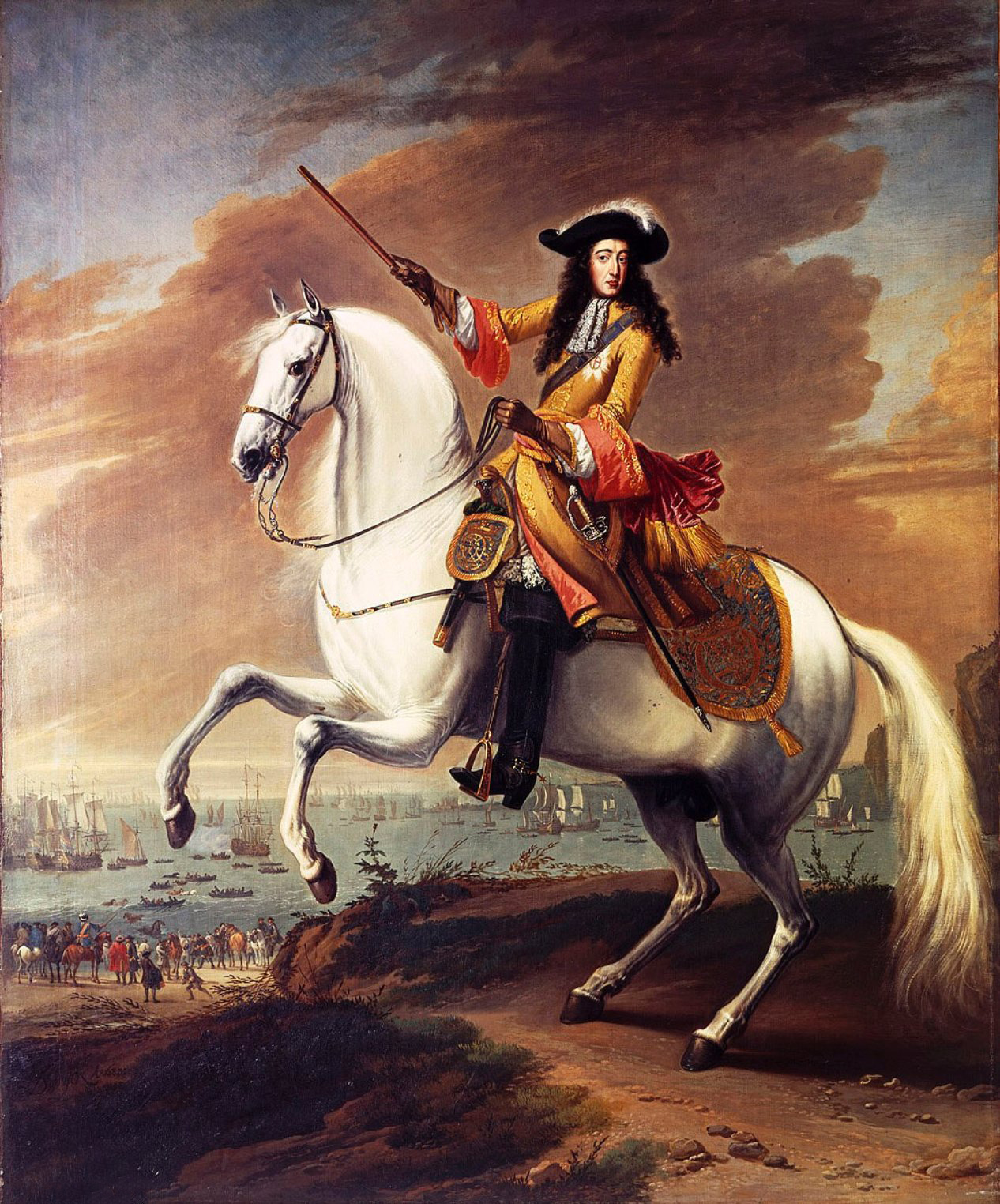
Equestrian portrait of William III by Jan Wyck, commemorating the landing at Brixham, Torbay, 5 November 1688

The two-party system, in the sense of the looser definition, where two parties dominate politics but in which third parties can elect members and gain some representation in the legislature, can be traced to the development of political parties in the United Kingdom. There was a division in English politics at the time of the Civil War and Glorious Revolution in the late 17th century. The Whigs supported Protestant constitutional monarchy against absolute rule and the Tories, originating in the Royalist (or "Cavalier") faction of the English Civil War, were conservative royalist supporters of a strong monarchy as a counterbalance to the republican tendencies of Parliament. In the following century, the Whig party's support base widened to include emerging industrial interests and wealthy merchants.

The basic matters of principle that defined the struggle between the two factions, were concerning the nature of constitutional monarchy, the desirability of a Catholic king, the extension of religious toleration to nonconformist Protestants, and other issues that had been put on the liberal agenda through the political concepts propounded by John Locke, Algernon Sidney and others.

Vigorous struggle between the two factions characterised the period from the Glorious Revolution to the 1715 Hanoverian succession, over the legacy of the overthrow of the Stuart dynasty and the nature of the new constitutional state. This proto two-party system fell into relative abeyance after the accession to the throne of George I and the consequent period of Whig supremacy under Robert Walpole, during which the Tories were systematically purged from high positions in government. Although the Tories were dismissed from office for 50 years, they retained a measure of party cohesion under William Wyndham and acted as a united, though unavailing, opposition to Whig corruption and scandals. At times they cooperated with the "Opposition Whigs", Whigs who were in opposition to the Whig government. The ideological gap between the Tories and the Opposition Whigs prevented them from coalescing as a single party.

=== British emergence ===
The old Whig leadership dissolved in the 1760s into a decade of factional chaos with distinct "Grenvillite", "Bedfordite", "Rockinghamite", and "Chathamite" factions successively in power, and all referring to themselves as "Whigs". Out of this chaos, the first distinctive parties emerged. The first such party was the Rockingham Whigs under the leadership of Charles Watson-Wentworth and the intellectual guidance of the political philosopher Edmund Burke. Burke laid out a philosophy that described the basic framework of the political party as "a body of men united for promoting by their joint endeavours the national interest, upon some particular principle in which they are all agreed". As opposed to the instability of the earlier factions, which were often tied to a particular leader and could disintegrate if removed from power, the two party system was centred on a set of core principles held by both sides and that allowed the party out of power to remain as the Loyal Opposition to the governing party.

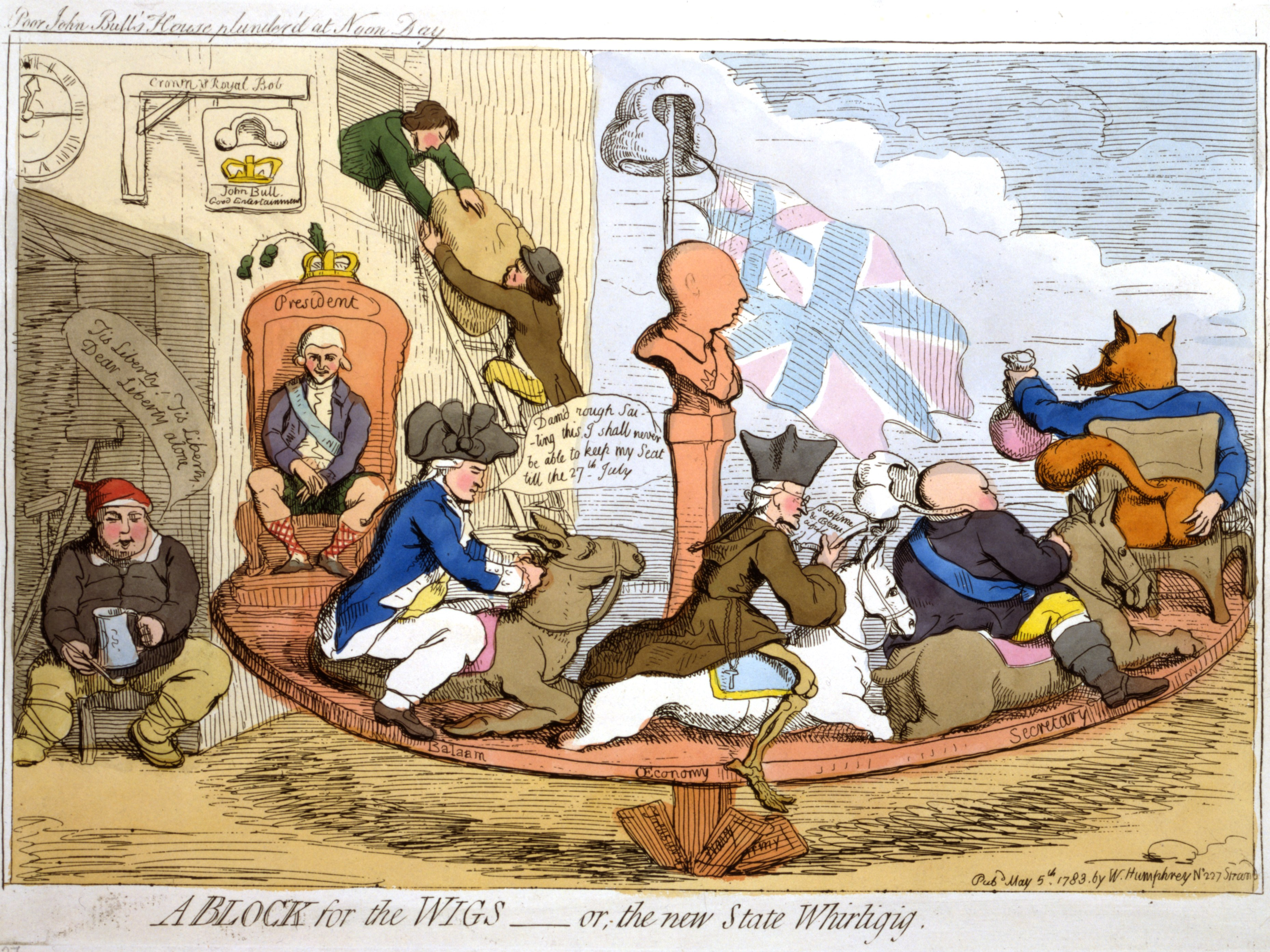
In A Block for the Wigs (1783), James Gillray caricatured Fox's return to power in a coalition with North. George III is the blockhead in the center.

A genuine two-party system began to emerge, with the accession to power of William Pitt the Younger in 1783 leading the new Tories, against a reconstituted "Whig" party led by the radical politician Charles James Fox.

The two-party system matured in the early 19th century era of political reform, when the franchise was widened and politics entered into the basic divide between conservatism and liberalism that has fundamentally endured up to the present. The modern Conservative Party was created out of the "Pittite" Tories by Robert Peel, who issued the Tamworth Manifesto in 1834 which set out the basic principles of Conservatism – the necessity in specific cases of reform in order to survive, but an opposition to unnecessary change, that could lead to "a perpetual vortex of agitation". Meanwhile, the Whigs, along with free trade Tory followers of Robert Peel, and independent Radicals, formed the Liberal Party under Lord Palmerston in 1859, and transformed into a party of the growing urban middle-class, under the long leadership of William Ewart Gladstone. The two party system had come of age at the time of Gladstone and his Conservative rival Benjamin Disraeli after the Reform Act 1867.

=== American ===
Although the Founding Fathers of the United States did not originally intend for American politics to be partisan, early political controversies in the 1790s saw the emergence of a two-party political system, the Federalist Party and the Democratic-Republican Party, centred on the differing views on federal government powers of Secretary of the Treasury Alexander Hamilton and James Madison. A consensus on these issues ended party politics in 1816 for a decade, a period commonly known as the Era of Good Feelings.

Partisan politics revived in 1829 with the split of the Democratic-Republican Party into the Jacksonian Democrats led by Andrew Jackson, and the Whig Party, led by Henry Clay. The former evolved into the modern Democratic Party and the latter was replaced with the Republican Party as one of the two main parties in the 1850s.

== See also ==
- Dominant-party system
- Duverger's law
- False dichotomy
- Multi-party system
- One-party state
- Political organisation
- Uniparty
