= Maurice Duverger =

French political scientist (1917–2014)

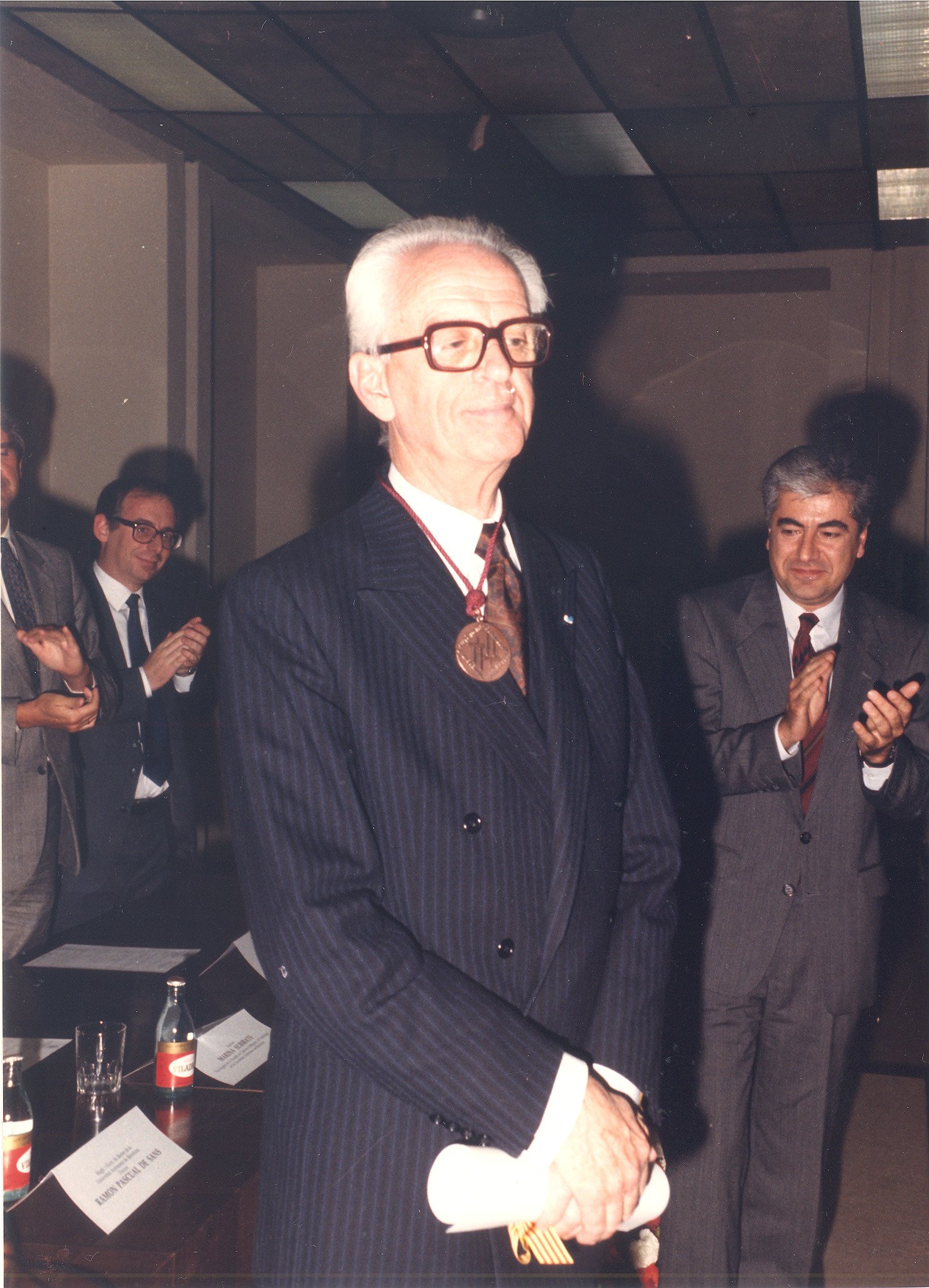

Member of the European Parliament
- In office 25 July 1989 – 18 July 1994
- Constituency: Italy

Personal details
- Born: 6 May 1917 Angoulême, Charente, France
- Died: 16 December 2014 (aged 97)
- Party: Italian Communist Party; Democratic Party of the Left

Maurice Duverger (/ˈduːvərʒeɪ/ DOO-vər-zhay; French: [mɔʁis dyvɛʁʒe]; 5 June 1917 – 16 December 2014) was a French jurist, sociologist, political scientist and politician born in Angoulême, Charente. Starting his career as a jurist at the University of Bordeaux, Duverger became more and more involved in political science and in 1948 founded one of the first faculties for political science in Bordeaux, France. An emeritus professor of the Sorbonne and member of the FNSP, he published many books and articles in international newspapers, such as Corriere della Sera and la Repubblica in Italy, El País in Spain, and especially Le Monde in France.

Duverger studied the evolution of political systems and the institutions that operate in diverse countries, showing a preference for empirical methods of investigation rather than philosophical reasoning. He devised a theory which became known as Duverger's law, which identifies a correlation between a first-past-the-post election system and the formation of a two-party system. While analysing the political system of France, he coined the term semi-presidential system.

A staunch communist and Soviet Union admirer, he wrote following the February 1956 speech by Soviet leader Nikita Khrushchev that Stalin had been no better and no worse than the majority of tyrants who preceded him, adding that the Russian Communist Party was a living organism whose cells were continuously rejuvenated, and that the fear of purges had kept the militants on edge, constantly reviving their zeal. From 1989 until 1994, he was a member of the Italian Communist Party, later the Democratic Party of the Left, in the European Parliament. In 1981, he was elected a member of the Serbian Academy of Sciences and Arts. He died at the age of 97 on 16 December 2014.

== Career ==
A member of Doriot's fascist Parti Populaire Français from age 20, Maurice Duverger completed his studies at the Bordeaux Department of Law in 1942, before lecturing in law at Poitiers in 1942, and Bordeaux in 1943 (where he would, in 1948, founded the Institut d'études politiques de Bordeaux as its first director). He also taught at Vichy France's Institut d'études corporatives et sociales. In his first publication, "The Constitutions of France" (1944), he explained that the French constitution of 1940 created a "de facto government". However, towards the end of the war, Duverger grew close to the Resistance, and in Libération analyzed the legitimacy of the new government of France and devoted himself to social-scientific theory.

After the War, he taught in the faculty of law and economic sciences in Paris, 1955 to 1985, and contributed to Libération and Le Monde. From 1989 to 1994, he sat in the European Parliament as an MEP for the Italian Communist Party. In 1946 he expanded his theses, with a special interest in the relation between electoral systems and party systems. This interest is at the heart of his most important publication: "The Political Parties" (1951). The work is one of the classics of party research, translated into several languages. That thesis led to Duverger's law, and later he coined the term "semi-presidentialism" and "semi-parliamentarism".

=== Political parties ===
Having as a point of reference their structure, Duverger in his book Les Partis Politiques (1951) distinguished parties between elite-based parties and mass-based parties. Elite-based parties rather prefer the quality of their members over their quantity, their affiliates being people of great influence on local or national scale. They have flexible and disorganized structures, in general are weakly disciplined and lack developed pragmatic content, allowing each of their members to benefit from an enormous freedom of action. Their funding is generally provided by a sponsor, and as their strength comes from their elected representatives, they are typical parties of parliamentarian creation, which depend on the reputation and support of their benefactors.

Mass-based parties possess a secure organization and a strong structure arranged as a pyramid, with superposed hierarchically arranged levels. Their members identify themselves more with the party's ideology than with its leader, so they have an abstract adhesion. Their decisions are based on the participation of each one of its members, and its founding is granted by their members' payments, a situation that leads them to gain as many adherents as possible. These parties tend to develop on a par with suffrage and democracy. For instance, elite-based parties execute an often sporadic political labor, focused on elections. However, the disadvantage this implies in relation to their contestant parties (which denote permanent labor and a disciplined and organic structure), impels them to modify their organization to become mass-based parties.

== Duverger's law ==
With discovery attributed to Duverger, he observed the effect and recorded it in several papers published in the 1950s and 1960s. In the course of further research, other political scientists began calling the effect a "law" or principle. Duverger's law suggests a nexus or synthesis between a party system and an electoral system: a proportional representation system creates the electoral conditions necessary to foster party development while a plurality system marginalizes many smaller political parties, resulting in what is known as a two-party system.

In political science, Duverger's law is a principle which asserts that plurality rule elections structured within single-member districts tends to favor a two-party system. This is one of two hypotheses proposed by Duverger, the second stating that "the double ballot majority system and proportional representation tend to multipartism."

== Works ==
- Les partis politiques (1951)
- La participation des femmes à la vie politique (1955)
- Les finances publiques (1956)
- Méthodes de la science politique (1959)
- De la dictature (1961)
- Méthodes des Sciences sociales (1961)
- Introduction à la politique (1964)
- Sociologie politique (1966)
- La démocratie sans les peuples (1967)
- Institutions politiques et Droit constitutionnel (1970)
- Janus: les deux faces de l'Occident (1972)
- Sociologie de la politique (1973)
- L'autre côté des choses (1977)
- King's Mate (1978)
- Les orangers du lac Balaton (1980)
- Factors in a Two-Party and Multiparty System, in Party Politics and Pressure Groups (New York: Thomas Y. Crowell, 1972), pp. 23–32.
- Political Parties: Their Organization and Activity in the Modern State
- The Study of Politics ISBN 0-690-79021-X
- La République des Citoyens (1982) ISBN 2-85956-311-3
- Lettre Ouverte aux Socialistes (Collection Lettre ouverte) ISBN 2-226-00326-6
- Modern Democracies: Economic Power Versus Political Power ISBN 0-03-077280-X
- La Cohabitation des Français ISBN 2-13-041498-2
- Europe des Hommes: Une Métamorphose Inachevée (1994) ISBN 2-7381-0262-X
- The Idea of Politics: the Uses of Power in Society(1966)
- The French Political System
- L'Europe dans tous ses États (1995)

== See also ==
- Duverger's law
- Micromega rule
