= Rein Taagepera =

Estonian political scientist (born 1933)

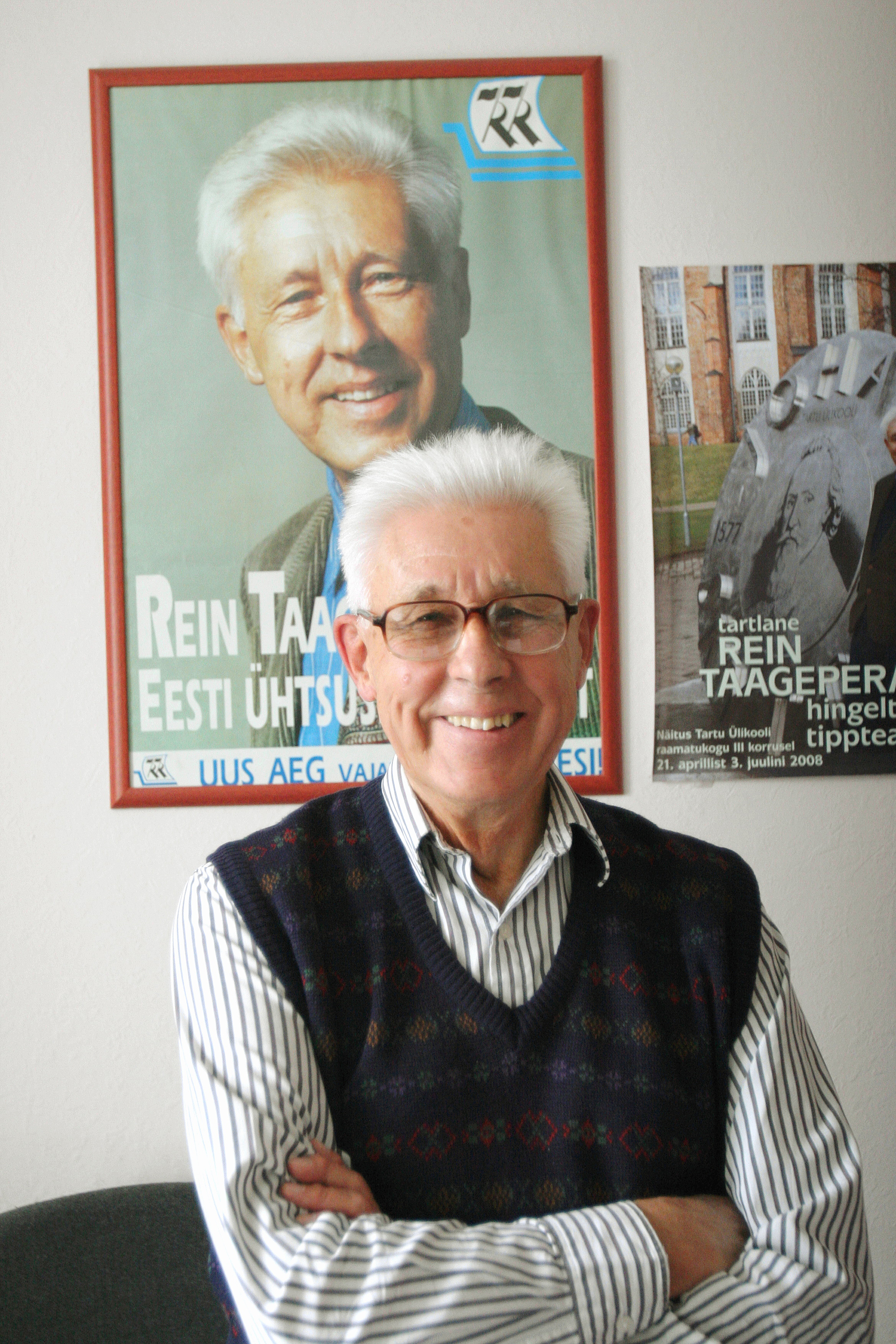
- Taagepera in 2009
- Born: 28 February 1933 (age 93); Tartu, Estonia
- Education: University of Toronto (BS, MS) University of Delaware (PhD, MA)
- Awards: Johan Skytte Prize in Political Science (2008); APSA Longley Award (2003); APSA Hallett Award (1999); Estonian National Science Prize (1999); Tuglas Prize (1990); Constantine Panunzio Distinguished Emeriti Award (2013-14)

Leader of the Res Publica Party
- In office 2001–2002
- Preceded by: Position established
- Succeeded by: Juhan Parts

Rein Taagepera (born 28 February 1933) is an Estonian political scientist and former politician.

== Education ==
Taagepera was born on 28 February 1933 in Tartu, Estonia. He fled from Soviet-occupied Estonia in 1944. Taagepera graduated from high school in Marrakesh, Morocco, and studied physics in Canada and the United States. He received a B.A. Sc in Nuclear Engineering in 1959 and a M.A. in Physics in 1961 from the University of Toronto, and a Ph.D. from the University of Delaware in 1965. Working in industry until 1970, he received another M.A. in international relations in 1969 and moved to academia as a political scientist at the University of California, Irvine, where he stayed for his American career. Taagepera is professor emeritus at the University of Tartu.

== Political career ==
Taagepera served as president of the Association for the Advancement of Baltic Studies from 1986 until 1988. In 1991, he returned to Estonia as the founding dean of a new School of Social Sciences at the University of Tartu, which merged into a full-fledged faculty in 1994, and where he became professor of political science (1994–1998).

In 1991, he was a member of the Estonian Constitutional Assembly, and in 1992, he ran as a presidential candidate against Arnold Rüütel (3rd President of the Republic of Estonia, 2001–2006), and Lennart Meri (2nd President of the Republic of Estonia, 1992–2001), who won the election. Taagepera came in third with 23% of the popular vote. Later Taagepera admitted that one of the reasons why he ran, despite having little chance to win, was to take away votes from Rüütel and thus help Meri rise to the presidency.

In 2003, Taagepera agreed to serve for half a year as the founding chairman of a new political party, Res Publica, which won the general elections that year and lead the governing coalition under Prime Minister Juhan Parts until April 2005. Taagepera tried to hold the party more or less in the middle of the spectrum (Taagepera suggested he was centre-left politician). In 2005, Taagepera resigned his Res Publica membership, frustrated with the party's leadership style and move to the right. In April 2006, Res Publica decided to merge with the national-conservative Pro Patria Union party.

== Scholarly works ==
Taagepera's theoretical scholarly work, which mainly deals with electoral systems, is heavily quantitative and modelling in character and strongly informed by the epistemology of his previous field, physics. The quantitative approach is his general attitude towards political science as a scholarly discipline. He is the creator, together with Markku Laakso, of the Laakso-Taagepera index which estimates the "Effective number of parties". He systematized numerous contributions in electoral systems theory into a general, quantitative theoretical framework, exposed in the volume Predicting Party Sizes: The Logic of Simple Electoral Systems (2007). Together with Matthew Shugart, they presented a holistic model of electoral system effects known as the seat product model.

Taagepera's original epistemological and methodological approach, defined as logical quantitative modeling, is systematically presented in the recent volume Making Social Sciences More Scientific. The Need for Predictive Models (2008). Of special interest is his research in the World System hyperbolic growth.

Apart from the quantitative study of electoral and party systems, Taagepera has published several studies of Estonian and Baltic history, politics, and culture. These latter are more personal and take strong normative positions. Taagepera has written award-winning pieces of prose, most notably Livland-Leaveland in 1990. It was awarded the Tuglas Prize in the same year.

=== Key publications ===
- Size and Duration of Empires: Systematics of Size, 1978 ISSN 0049-089X
- Size and Duration of Empires: Growth-Decline Curves, 3000 to 600 B.C., 1978 ISSN 0049-089X
- Size and Duration of Empires: Growth-Decline Curves, 600 B.C. to 600 A.D., 1979 JSTOR 1170959
- Laakso, Markku; Taagepera, Rein (1979). ""Effective" Number of Parties: A Measure with Application to West Europe". Comparative Political Studies. 12 (1): 3–27. doi:10.1177/001041407901200101. ISSN 0010-4140. S2CID 143250203.
- Seats and Votes: The Effects and Determinants of Electoral Systems, 1989, co-author
- Estonia: Return to independence, 1993
- The Baltic States: Years of Dependence, 1940-1990, 2nd edn. 1993, co-author ISBN 0-520-08228-1
- Expansion and Contraction Patterns of Large Polities: Context for Russia, 1997 JSTOR 2600793
- The Finno-Ugric republics and the Russian state, 1999
- "Meteoric trajectory: The Res Publica Party in Estonia" (2006), Democratization 13(1): 78-94. the original conference paper as pdf file This essay gives a moderately candid account of Taagepera's Res Publica chairmanship and his evaluation of the party and its rise and fall.
- Predicting Party Sizes: The Logic of Simple Electoral Systems, 2007 ISBN 0-19-928774-0
- Making Social Sciences More Scientific. The Need for Predictive Models, 2008 ISBN 0-19-953466-7
- Parsimonious model for predicting mean cabinet duration on the basis of electoral system (with Allan Sikk), Party Politics, 2010.
- Votes from Seats: Logical Models of Electoral Systems, 2017, co-author ISBN 110840426X
- More People, Fewer States: The Past and Future of World Population and Empire Sizes, 2024, co-author ISBN 9781009427821

== Recognition ==
Taagepera received the American Political Science Association's Hallett (1999) and Longley (2003) Awards as well as the Estonian National Science Prize, Social Science Category (1999), the Johan Skytte Prize in Political Science (2008), and the Karl Deutsch Award (2016).
