= Douglas W. Rae =

American political scientist (born 1939)

- Citizenship: American
- Education: Indiana University, University of Wisconsin, Madison
- Occupation: Political scientist
- Employer: Yale University

Douglas Whiting Rae (born 1939) is an American political scientist. He is the Richard Ely Professor of Political Science and Management at Yale University. He is a fellow of the American Academy of Arts and Sciences and served as Chief Administrative Officer of the City of New Haven, Connecticut, in 1990–1991. He has contributed to the BBC, The New Republic, and The New York Times.

== Education ==
He is a graduate of Indiana University and the University of Wisconsin-Madison, where his Ph.D. adviser was Austin Ranney.

== Research ==
Perhaps his most seminal work, The Political Consequences of Electoral Laws (1967, 2nd ed. 1971), was the first systematic comparative analysis of electoral systems, applying the mathematical tools of social science to past elections in the Western industrialized world to determine the effects of electoral laws on election results, in particular on proportionality i.e. the correspondences between parties' vote shares and seat shares, and the number of parties in a given country. While the book has become dated by the explosion in electoral studies that occurred across the world more than a decade later, much of his terminology and guiding criteria e.g. his three basic dimensions of electoral systems (1) electoral formula (the mathematical method for translating votes into seats), (2) district magnitude (the number of members to be elected in a district), and (3) ballot structure (the way in which electoral choices are presented on the ballot), remain standard. It is generally regarded as the most important work on voting systems since Maurice Duverger's "Political Parties" (1951, trans. 1954).

Rae's other highly influential book is Equalities, published in 1981. A noteworthy work on equality theory, "Equalities" compares and contrasts the ideas of a number of political theorists, including Immanuel Kant, Robert Nozick, John Rawls, and Vilfredo Pareto.

City: Urbanism and its End, published in 2003, is a history of New Haven, Connecticut and puts forth an account of late-19th and early-20th century urbanism in American cities. In City, Rae presents detailed evidence of the flourishing civic life present in New Haven and elsewhere in this period. He maintains that urbanism was a product of "centering technologies"—such as rail and alternating current electricity—and many of the vital qualities associated with urbanism were contingent on these "accidents of urban creation." In the case of New Haven, he argues that the unparalleled spending on urban renewal by the administration of Mayor Richard C. Lee were necessarily unable to halt the technological shifts that caused urbanism's end. Rae contends that, given the futility of resurrecting the physical qualities of urbanism, that further spending on urbanist regeneration should focus on the positive social qualities of urbanism.

== Awards ==
Rae has been awarded a Guggenheim Fellowship, was a fellow of Stanford’s Center for Advanced Study in the Behavioral Sciences, a fellow of the Netherlands Institute for Advanced Study, and has received numerous honors and prizes for his research. He has consulted widely and variously to the parliaments of Spain, Italy, & the Netherlands Antilles, select corporate leaders, to numerous American cities and universities, and to the BBC.

== Publications ==
=== Dissertation ===
- Rae, Douglas. (1967). The Politics of Electoral Law

=== Books ===
- ——. (1967). The Political Consequences of Electoral Laws
- ——, Taylor, Michael. (1970). The Analysis of Political Cleavages
- ——. (1981). Equalities
- ——. (Yale University Press, 2003). City: Urbanism and Its End (re-issued 2008) ISBN 9780300107746
- ——, Bass, Paul. (Basic Books, 2005). Murder in the Model City: The Black Panthers, Yale, and the Redemption of a Killer ISBN 9780465069026

=== Articles ===
- ——. (1969). "Decision-rules and Individual Values in Constitutional Choice." American Political Science Review
- ——. (1971). "Political Democracy as a Property of Political Institutions." American Political Science Review
- ——. (1975). "The Limits of Consensual Decision." American Political Science Review
- ——. Daudt, H. (1976). "The Ostrogorski Paradox: A Peculiarity of Compound Majority Decision" European Journal of Political Research
- ——. (1995). "Using District Magnitude to Regulate Political Party Competition." American Political Science Review

=== Edited volumes ===
- ——, Eismeier, Theodor J. (ed.) (1979). Public Policy and Public Choice
