= Ranked-choice voting =

Ranked-choice voting may be used as a synonym for:

- Ranked voting, a term used for any voting system in which voters are asked to rank candidates in order of preference
- Instant-runoff voting (IRV), a specific ranked voting system with single-winner districts
- Single transferable vote (STV), a specific ranked voting system with multi-winner districts; often called "proportional ranked choice voting"
