= Two-and-a-half party system =

Political party system

Two-and-a-half party system is a party system where each of the two major political parties that stand apart on the political spectrum needs a coalition with a smaller "half" party for political control. The concept was proposed by Jean Blondel in his party system classification (1968), where the two-and-a-half party system occupies middle space between the two-party and multiparty systems. The system was quite rare in the first half of the 20th century, but its popularity grew after the Second World War, and peaked in the 1970s.

== Examples ==
Typical examples of the two-and-a-half party arrangement include the late-20th century political systems of Germany, Austria, Canada, Ireland, and Australia.

=== Germany ===
For a long time Germany politics used a classic two-and-half system with Union parties (CDU/CSU) and Social Democrats (SPD) playing the roles of the major parties, with Free Democratic Party (FDP) being a near-perfect example of the "half": while FDP never got more that 14% of the seats, it was part of the government for 41 years out of the first 53 post-war years. Until 1998, the major changes in the German government (1969 and 1982) were not related to the swings of the vote count, but to FDP changing a different major party as its coalition partner. Germany party system started evolving towards a multiparty one already in the 1980s-1990s as the Greens became a significant political force.

=== Austria ===
Austrian party system closely mirrored the German one, with Socialists (SPÖ) and Christian Democrats (ÖVP) being the major parties. Liberals (FPÖ) and Greens playing the role of "half" parties. However, Austria had a long tradition of grand coalitions (1945−1966, 1987−1999), where the smaller parties were not in the government.

=== Canada ===
In Canada, the Liberals and Conservatives are the major parties, with the New Democrats (until 1993) being the "half" (earlier, Social Credit can be considered "half" party). Due to Liberals being significantly stronger than the Conservatives, frequently Canadian hung parliaments resulted in minority governments without formal coalitions; the winner of the plurality of votes aligned with smaller parties on ideas without providing them with the government seats.

=== Ireland ===
In Ireland, the Fianna Fáil and the significantly smaller Fine Gael were the major parties setting the stage for two-and-a-half party system well into 1980s. Fianna Fáil were sometimes winning an outright majorities in the parliament, while Fine Gail had to rely on half party support provided by Labour. Since the 1990s, Irish politics became multiparty and multidimensional, so more complex coalitions became possible.

=== Australia ===
Australia was a special case: technically, two major parties, the Liberals and Labor together with a "half" National Party that helps Liberals get a majority is a two-and-a-half party system. However, the alliance between the Liberals and the National Party appeared to be unbreakable: the half party was represented in the government even when Liberals got a majority of their own and did not need the coalition, so the Australian system could also be thought of as a two-party one.

== Shares of the votes ==
In the two-and-a-half party systems the major parties typically have a combined 75-80% of the vote, with a significant (10%) difference between them.

The percentage of votes sufficient for the party to become the "half" varies by the electoral system. For example, in the United Kingdom with its first-past-the-post voting, Liberal Democrats in the second half of the 20th century were getting about 20% of the votes for decades, but practically never (with the exception of the late 1970s) were able to participate in the government. In Germany where the proportional voting is used, Free Democrats, despite their much smaller share of votes (12-13%), were able on multiple occasions to decide whether the government be center-left or center-right.

== Critique ==
The concept of two-and-a-half party system is critiqued for lumping together the systems with very different roles of the "half" party, from "kingmakers" like the Free Democrats in Germany prior to 1990s to "wing parties" like New Democrats in Canada with their less critical role. The researchers also question the need to highlight one smaller party in the otherwise very regular multiparty arrangement.

== See also ==
- Effective number of parties

== Sources ==
- Tuck, D.; Jenkins, S.; Jefferies, J. (2023). Pearson Edexcel A Level Politics 2nd edition: UK Government and Politics, Political Ideas and US Government and Politics. Hodder Education. ISBN 978-1-3983-6878-1.
- Siaroff, Alan (May 2003). "Two-and-a-Half-Party Systems and the Comparative Role of the 'Half'" (PDF). Party Politics. 9 (3): 267–290. doi:10.1177/1354068803009003001. S2CID 144175155.
- Wolinetz, Steven (2006). "Party systems and party system types". In Katz, R.S.; Crotty, W.J. (eds.). Handbook of Party Politics. SAGE Publications. pp. 51–62. ISBN 978-0-7619-4314-3.
