= Ostrogorski's paradox =

Voting paradox

Ostrogorski's paradox is a voting paradox studied in social choice theory.

The paradox states that if each voter during an election voted for the political party with which they agreed on a majority of issues, then it is still possible that a majority of voters will disagree with the winning majority party on every issue.

The paradox resembles the structure underlying the Condorcet paradox and Simpson's paradox and it has been proved that in every instance of Ostrogorski's paradox there is an underlying Condorcet paradox.

It is named after Russian politician and political scientist Moisey Ostrogorsky.
