= Party system =

Political groupings in a democracy

A party system is a concept in comparative political science concerning the system of government by political parties in a democratic country. The idea is that political parties have basic similarities: they control the government, have a stable base of mass popular support, and create internal mechanisms for controlling funding, information and nominations.

The party system concept was originated by European scholars studying the United States, especially James Bryce, Giovanni Sartori and Moisey Ostrogorsky, and has been expanded to cover other democracies. Party systems can be distinguished by the degree of political fragmentation, proportionality of seats-to-votes ratio and barriers to entry to the political competition.

== Types of party systems ==
Main classification of party systems is using the number of parties. Counting the "effective number" of parties is somewhat tricky since the decisions need to be made as to which parties shall be included into the count. Including all parties usually makes little sense: for example, in the 2005 United Kingdom general election 16 entities run candidates and 12 got seats in the parliament, however, no researcher would argue that UK at the time had a 16- or 12-party system. The practical choice would be between a two-party (Labour won 35% of the vote, Conservatives 32%), or three-party system (Liberal Democrats got 22%). Some researchers suggest to exclude parties with low percentage of votes (for example, Alan Ware recommends a 3% threshold), others, like Giovanni Sartori, suggest looking at the history of participation in the governments. The 2005 UK example will yield 3 parties if Ware's definition is used and 2 parties if Sartori's definition is chosen, since the Liberal Democrats almost never influenced the government formation.

The classification is based on the typology originally proposed by Jean Blondel (1968):

- One-party system: a system in which a single political party has the right to form the government, usually based on the existing constitution, or where only one party has the exclusive control over political power. Example: China
- Dominant-party system: a system where there is "a category of parties/political organizations that have successively won election victories and whose future defeat cannot be envisaged or is unlikely for the foreseeable future". Example: Russia
- Two party system: a system where only two parties or alliances, typically placed either side of the center, have a realistic chance of forming a majority. Other parties are very minor or solely regional. Example: United States, United Kingdom
- Two-and-a-half party system where each of the two major political parties that stand apart on the political spectrum needs a coalition with a smaller "half" party for political control. Example: post-war Federal Republic of Germany until the end of the 20th century
- Multi-party system: a system in which multiple political parties have the capacity to gain control of government offices, separately or in coalition. Example: Sweden, Ireland
- Non-partisan system: a system of government or organization such that universal and periodic elections take place without reference to political parties. Example: Micronesia

Sartori splits the original Blondel's "one-party" category into true one party (no other ones exist), "hegemonic" (other parties exist, but there is no practical competition), and "predominant", where competition exists, but one party on a regular basis gets over 50% of the votes. He had also split the multiparty system into "moderate pluralism" (3–5 "relevant" parties) and "extreme pluralism" (6–8 parties) and introduced an "atomized" party system, where the political system is so fragmented that adding one more party does not affect the political process at all. The functioning of the moderate pluralism resembles the two-party rule: there are two camps separated in the political spectrum with established electorate, the competition occurs for the voters in the political center, the political forces are "centripetal". The "polarized pluralism" is different: "anti-system parties" position themselves at the fringes of the spectrum are detached from the center, so the parties in the center are left without a credible election threat. This results in deep political divisions, "centrifugal forces", and "irresponsible oppositions" that do "outbidding" secure in their knowledge that they will not have to govern and thus can safely over-promise. Sartori declares that the 5-party threshold between moderate and extreme pluralism is not a cause of change, but a result of the process of elite accommodation in the moderate case and lack thereof in the extreme pluralism.

== Party systems by country or region ==
=== Europe ===
Democratic party systems in most European states have increasingly fragmented over time. That means that the number of relevant parties surged, while the average size declined. Hence, the effective number of parties increased.

==== European Union ====
The European Parliament has compared to other parliaments a higher number of political parties with 206; to reduce political fragmentation the parties are organized into 7 political groups. Two structures of party system have been identified in the European Parliament since its first universal direct election in 1979, albeit the main EU party groups remained the same:

- 1979–1994: a system split in two blocs on the left/right dimension, with the left bloc (Socialists, Communists and Greens) opposing a right bloc (Christian democrats, Liberals and Gaullists)
- 1994–present: a system in which the three central parties (the conservative EPP, the socialist PES and the liberal ALDE) have voted as much with each other as with their smaller allies, thus 'governing' the system, and facing different oppositions from the left (European Left and Greens and leftist eurosceptics) and from the right (Gaullists, rightist eurosceptics and nationalists).

==== Italy ====
Italian party systems are usually considered only since the foundation of the Italian Republic (1946) as pre-fascist parties lacked a wide popular base.

The party system of the so-called First Republic (1948–1994), though based on a proportional electoral law, saw the dominance of the Christian Democracy (DC) and the conventio ad excludendum against the Italian Communist Party (PCI). DC and PCI together gathered around 85% of the votes on average. The system was thus a blocked bipolar system; governments were very short (in average lasting less than one year) and post-electoral, but the supporting parties and personnel could not change. With time, some parties (especially the Italian Socialist Party, PSI) gained momentum, until reaching the role of government-making in the 1980s. The system was completely destroyed by the bribery scandals of Tangentopoli, which shattered DC and PSI. According to Sartori, the two possible degenerations of proportionalism (fragmentation and lack of party discipline) were reduced by two factors: the strong role of parties ("partitocrazia") and the polarization between Christian-democrats and communists. Therefore, the first republic saw a maximum level of 5 effective parties, with only one dominant party.

The so-called Second Republic party system (since 1994) bears the following characteristic marks:

- a majoritarian electoral law, introduced by referendum in 1993, which brought about a bi-polarization of the game (although limited by the 1/4 of votes still gathered proportionally)
- the birth of Forza Italia as personal party of Silvio Berlusconi, with a strong polarization effect
- the rise of new parties (the environmentalists Verdi and the autonomist Lega Nord since the late 1980s, Alleanza Nazionale through a reform of the post-fascist Italian Social Movement)
- the split of old parties (between reformed post-communist Democratic Party of the Left and neo-communists of Rifondazione Comunista; between left-wing and right-wing of old Christian Democrats and Socialists, siding with or against Berlusconi)

Though more fragmented in the number of parties, the system was bipolar in its functioning. With time, both sides saw a strengthening of coalitions (even if with ups and downs) and the birth of unified parties (the Ulivo federation and then the Democratic Party on the left, and the People of Freedom party on the right side). The change in the electoral law in 2005 and the return to proportionality (although with a majority premium able to transform, in the lower chamber, the plurality in a 55% majority) did not bring about a return to collusion, while still leaving such prospect open for the future.

==== Germany ====
The 2009 Bundestag election in Germany was characterized by widespread public apathy and record low voter turnout. Weldon and Nüsser (2010) argue that it solidified a new stable, but fluid five-party system that they see as a defining feature of the emerging German political system. The three minor parties each achieved historical bests at the polls with steep losses for the two traditional Volksparteien. They report that the increased volatility and fluidity of the party system is structured along the left-right ideological spectrum with the parties divided into two major camps and vote-switching much more likely within the respective camps rather than between them.

The 2009 election also marked a devastating defeat for the SPD, leading some commentators to speculate about the end of the Social Democratic Party of Germany (SPD) as a "catch-all party" and, against the backdrop of recent poor performance of center-left parties all across Europe—perhaps even "the end of social democracy".

The 2013 election saw the first time that the liberal Free Democratic Party (FDP) that had been represented in parliament since 1949 and formed part of government as a coalition partner to either SPD or CDU (Christian Democratic Union, the major conservative / center-right party) for almost all of the period from 1949 to 1998 and again from 2009 to 2013 fell below the 5% threshold for parliamentary representation. The same election also saw the rise of the "Alternative for Germany" (AfD) party that ran on an anti-Euro platform and failed to enter parliament on their first federal election just barely with 4.8% of the vote.

After this election the second grand coalition between CDU and SPD since 2005 was formed. Prior to that Germany had only had one grand coalition that governed from 1966 to 1969, typically coalitions of one big and one small party at the federal level were used instead in a two-and-a-half party arrangement. Whether this shift proves temporary or permanent remains yet to be seen

==== Central and Eastern Europe ====
Four party systems have been identified in post-communist countries of Central-Eastern Europe:

- I system (late 1980s – early 1990s): dominated by the opposition between communists and anti-communists, i.e. from supporters and opponents of the old regime; spontaneous mass movements formed on idealistic bases and transformed into 'umbrella parties'
- II system (early 1990s): opposition between winners and losers of the economic transition to a market economy. Anti-communist parties split and formed unstable coalition governments. Many parties, with a narrow political base, grew up
- III system (late 1990s): the social conflicts of market transition aggravated, and social-democratic post-communist parties took over. The party system concentrated, while electoral volatility was extremely high
- IV system (2000s): rise of a relatively stable and modestly concentrated party system, organized on a left-right dimension, including post-communist parties. Fragmentation did not rise again after the fall of many social-democratic parties from government.

==== Finland ====
Finland was a Grand Duchy controlled by Russia until 1918. Nationalistic demands from the peasants and workers for greater use of the Finnish language led to the first political party: the Finnish Party in 1860. In response, the Swedish-speaking aristocracy, landowners and businessmen formed their own political party. Thus emerged the first party system.

==== Greece ====
Following the collapse of the military dictatorship in 1974, the centre right New Democracy and centre left PASOK came to dominate the Greek party system. PASOK and New Democracy had a combined vote share of 80 percent or more in every election between 1981 and 2000. Following the 2008 recession and the ensuing sovereign debt crisis in the country, the populist left Syriza came to challenge the dominance of PASOK and New Democracy, increasing its vote share in every election from 2009 until eventually winning power in 2015.

=== Switzerland ===
Swiss Federal Assembly is organized by political groups.

=== Canada ===
==== Federal party systems ====
According to recent scholars, there have been four party systems in Canada at the federal level since Confederation, each with its own distinctive pattern of social support, patronage relationships, leadership styles, and electoral strategies. Political scientists disagree on the names and precise boundaries of the eras, however. Steve Patten identifies four party systems in Canada's political history.

Clarkson (2005) shows how the Liberal Party has dominated all the party systems, using different approaches. It began with a "clientelistic approach" under Laurier, which evolved into a "brokerage" system of the 1920s, 1930s and 1940s under Mackenzie King. The 1950s saw the emergence of a "pan-Canadian system", which lasted until the 1990s. The 1993 election – described by Clarkson as an electoral "earthquake" which "fragmented" the party system — saw the emergence of regional politics within a four party-system, whereby various groups championed regional issues and concerns. Clarkson concludes that the inherent bias built into the first-past-the-post system has chiefly benefited the Liberals.

- The first party system emerged from pre-Confederation colonial politics, reached its zenith from 1896 to 1911, and lasted until the Conscription Crisis of 1917. It was characterized by local patronage administered by the two largest parties, the Liberals and the Conservatives.
- The second system emerged following the First World War, and reached its peak in the period between 1935 and 1957. It was characterized by regionalism and saw the emergence of several protest parties, such as the Progressives, the Social Credit Party, and the Co-operative Commonwealth Federation.
- The third system emerged in 1963 lasted until 1983, and began to unravel thereafter. This period saw the traditional two parries challenged by a strong third party, the New Democratic Party. Campaigns during this era became more national in scope due to the advent of electronic media, and involved a greater focus on leadership. The dominant policy of the era was Keynesian economics. The Election Act of 1974 was introduced during this period, allowing candidates party affiliation to appear on ballots, therefore an increased importance of party labels. This led to a shift from a candidate-centred system to a party-centred system, resulting in party leaders and the label of the candidate to play a major role in the deciding factor for voters. Leon Epstein characterized Canada as a "two-party plus" system, as only the Liberal and Conservative Party could form government, with the NDP present but not winning many seats.
- The fourth party system began with the 1993 election, which saw the decline of the Progressive Conservatives and NDP and rise of the Reform Party of Canada and the Bloc Québécois, and eventually led to the PCs merging with the Reform-descended Canadian Alliance. It saw most parties move to one-member-one-vote leadership contests, and a major reform to campaign finance laws in 2004. The fourth party system has been characterized by market-oriented policies that abandoned Keynesian policies, but maintained the welfare state. It was the elections of both 1997 and 2000 that showed that there was significant transformation in Canada's party system, showing they have undergone a transformation into a genuine multiparty system.

==== Provincial party systems ====
Party systems differ across Canada in each province, as different provinces have different priorities, and values for their residents. According to Jared Wesley and Clare Buckley, there are two ways of comparing provincial party systems in Canada: "conflict intensity", which is the extent to which parties challenge each other on priorities and opinions, some party systems features more competition when it comes to party options; and competitiveness, a measure of how close the average election is in terms of outcome, an uncompetitive system would show dominance in one party but competitiveness is good in sense that it gives a better sense of democracy. This leads to what they determine are the two types of party systems that are common in provincial politics: centripetal party systems and centrifugal party systems.

- Centripetal party systems are most prevalent in Central and Atlantic Canada, due to regional, linguistic, religious, and ethnic cleavages. They are regions where typically one prominent party reigns. These regions are where the Liberal Party has remained a strong political force prominently for decades.
- Centrifugal party system which has been polarized to describe party systems such as those in Western Canada. Competition between various different parties with vast differences in ideologies and values.

Additionally, from elections based from 1960 to 1995, Wesley and Buckley concluded that there are four different classifications of a party system for each of the ten provincial party systems. These groupings of classifications have most likely changed since 1995, as there has been a rise in different political parties for different provinces since these times. The four categories include:

- One-party dominant: Alberta
- Traditional two-party: Nova Scotia, Prince Edward Island, Newfoundland
- Three-party: Ontario, Manitoba
- Polarized: British Columbia, Saskatchewan, Quebec, New Brunswick

There has been a growing separation between federal and provincial political party systems, resulting in a separation of political perspectives typically associated with specific parties therefore fewer provincial and federal systems are symmetrical. Provincial systems for example, are simpler, stable, and often reflect the cleavages of each province (such as language, religion, class and ethnicity).

==== Territorial party systems ====
Nunavut and the Northwest Territories do not have political parties, and instead operate under consensus government. All candidates run and are elected as independents, and the newly elected legislature decides which of its members will make up the executive council. Due to their smaller populations, many argue that the absence of political parties makes it easier for voters to decide the person they are voting for. Other argue that it makes it harder for voters to recognize the goals and priorities of candidates, and that the lack of an opposition makes it harder for identify issues during debates.

=== United States ===
The concept of the party system was introduced by English scholar James Bryce in American Commonwealth (1888).

American Party Systems was a major textbook by Charles Merriam in 1920s. In 1967 the most important single breakthrough appeared, The American Party Systems. Stages of Political Development, edited by William Nisbet Chambers and Walter Dean Burnham. It brought together historians and political scientists who agreed on a common framework and numbering system. Thus Chambers published The First Party System in 1972. Burnham published numerous articles and books. Closely related is the concept of critical elections (introduced by V. O. Key in 1955), and political realignments. Realigning elections involve major changes to the political system, regarding the coalition of voters, the rules of the game, finance and publicity, party organization, and party leadership.

A political science college textbook explains:

"Scholars generally agree that realignment theory identifies five distinct party systems with the following approximate dates and major parties: 1. 1796–1816, First Party System: Jeffersonian Republicans and Federalists; 2. 1840–1856, Second Party System: Democrats and Whigs; 3. 1860–1896, Third Party System: Republicans and Democrats; 4. 1896–1932, Fourth Party System: Republicans and Democrats; 5. 1932–, Fifth Party System: Democrats and Republicans."

There have been at least six different party systems throughout the history of the United States:

First Party System: This system can be considered to have developed as a result of the factions in the George Washington administration. The two factions were Alexander Hamilton and the Federalists and Thomas Jefferson and the Democratic-Republican Party. The Federalists argued for a strong national government with a national bank and a strong economic and industry system. The Democratic-Republicans argued for a limited government, with a greater emphasis on farmers and states' rights. After the 1800 presidential election, the Democratic-Republicans gained major dominance for the next sixty years, and the Federalists slowly died off.

Second Party System: This system developed as a result of the one party rule of the Democratic-Republicans not being able to contain some of the most pressing issues of the time, namely slavery. Out of this system came the Whig Party and Henry Clay's American System. Wealthier people tended to support the Whigs, and the poorer tended to support the Democrats. During the Jacksonian era, his Democratic Party evolved from Democratic-Republicans. The Whig party began to break apart into factions, mainly over the issue of slavery. This period lasted until 1860.

Third Party System: Beginning around the time of the start of the Civil War, this system was defined by bitter conflict and striking party differences and coalitions. These coalitions were most evidently defined by geography. The South was dominated by the Democrats who opposed the ending of slavery, and the North, with the exception of some major political machines, was dominated by the Republicans, who supported ending slavery. This era was a time of extreme industrial and economic expansion. The Third Party System lasted until 1896.

Fourth Party System: This era was defined by Progressivism and immigration, as well as the political aftermath of the American Civil War. Northeastern business supported the Republicans while the South and West supported the Democrats. Immigrant groups were courted by both parties. The Fourth Party System came to an end around 1932.

Fifth Party System: This system was defined by the creation of the New Deal Coalition by President Franklin D. Roosevelt in response to the Great Depression. This coalition supporting new social welfare programs brought together many under-privileged, working class, and minority groups including unions, Catholics, and Jews. It also attracted African-Americans, who had previously largely supported the Republican Party due to Lincoln's freeing of the slaves. This era lasted approximately until early-mid 1970s.

Sixth Party System: The transition to this system appears to have begun with the Civil Rights Act of 1964 with the Democrats subsequently losing their long dominance of the South in the late 1960s, with the GOP adopting the southern strategy leading to Republican dominance as evidenced by election results.

=== Argentina ===
Scholars of Argentina identify two distinct party systems, one in place between 1912 and 1940, the other emerging after 1946. The first party system was not consistently class based, but the second was, with the Radical Party representing the middle classes and the Peronists, workers and the poor.

== Bibliography ==
- Follett, Mary Parker. The new state: Group organization the solution of popular government. Longmans, Green and Co., 1918
- Gagnon, Alain, and Brian Tanguay, eds. Canadian parties in transition : recent trends and new paths for research (4th ed. 2017) online
- Ishiyama, John. "Electoral Systems, Ethnic Fragmentation, and Party System Volatility in Sub-Saharan African Countries", Northeast African Studies, Volume 10, Number 2, 2003 (New Series), pp. 203–220
- Lewis, Paul G. and Paul Webb, eds. Pan-European Perspectives on Party Politics (2003) online
- Lipset, Seymour M. and Stein Rokkan, eds. Party Systems And Voter Alignments (1967) online
  - Karvonen, Lauri, and Stein Kuhnle, eds. Party Systems and Voter Alignments Revisited (2000) updates on Lipset and Rokkan (1967) excerpt and text search
- Mainwaring, Scott, and Timothy R. Scully. Building Democratic Institutions: Party Systems in Latin America (1996)
- Mair, Peter, ed. The West European Party System (Oxford University Press, 1990) online excerpt pp. 302–310
- Mair, Peter. The Changing Irish Party System: Organisation, Ideology and Electoral Competition (London, 1987).
- Meleshevich, Andrey A. Party Systems in Post-Soviet Countries: A Comparative Study of Political Institutionalization in the Baltic States, Russia, and Ukraine (2007)
- Sartori, Giovanni (1976). Parties and Party Systems: A Framework for Analysis. Vol. 1. Cambridge University Press. ISBN 978-0-521-21238-0. (reprinted in 2005)
- Siaroff, Alan (May 2003). "Two-and-a-Half-Party Systems and the Comparative Role of the 'Half'" (PDF). Party Politics. 9 (3): 267–290. doi:10.1177/1354068803009003001. S2CID 144175155.
- Tan, Alexander C. Emerging Party Systems (2005)
- Tan, Paige Johnson. "Indonesia Seven Years after Soeharto: Party System Institutionalization in a New Democracy", Contemporary Southeast Asia: A Journal of International and Strategic Affairs, Volume 28, Number 1, April 2006, pp. 88–114
- Walch, James. Faction and Front: Party Systems in South India (1976)
- Ware, Alan. Political Parties and Party Systems (1995), covers France, Germany, Britain, Japan and U.S.
- Wolinetz, Steven (2006). "Party systems and party system types". In Katz, R.S.; Crotty, W.J. (eds.). Handbook of Party Politics. Sage Publications. ISBN 978-0-7619-4314-3.

=== Italy ===
- Bartolini, Stefano; Chiaramonte, Alessandro; D'Alimonte, Roberto (1 January 2004). "The Italian Party System between Parties and Coalitions". West European Politics. 27 (1): 1–19. doi:10.1080/01402380412331280783. ISSN 0140-2382. S2CID 153991866. Archived from the original on 2009-06-18.
- Calise, Mauro (1 October 1993). "Remaking the Italian party system: How Lijphart got it wrong by saying it right". West European Politics. 16 (4): 545–560. doi:10.1080/01402389308424990. ISSN 0140-2382. Archived from the original on 2012-11-05 – via HighBeam Research.
- Daalder, Ivo H. (1 July 1983). "The Italian party system in transition: The end of polarised pluralism?". West European Politics. 6 (3): 216–236. doi:10.1080/01402388308424427. ISSN 0140-2382.
- Giannetti, Daniela; Laver, Michael (1 December 2001). "Party system dynamics and the making and breaking of Italian governments". Electoral Studies. 20 (4): 529–553. doi:10.1016/S0261-3794(00)00048-2. ISSN 0261-3794.
- Pridham, Geoffrey. The Nature of the Italian Party System (St. Martin's Press, 1981)
- Tarrow, Sidney (1977). "The Italian Party System Between Crisis and Transition". American Journal of Political Science. 21 (2): 193–224. doi:10.2307/2110492. ISSN 0092-5853. JSTOR 2110492.

=== United States ===
- Bartley, Numan V. "Voters and Party Systems: A Review of the Recent Literature", The History Teacher, Vol. 8, No. 3 (May, 1975), pp. 452–469. JSTOR 491747
- Beck, Paul Allen. "Micropolitics in Macro Perspective: The Political History of Walter Dean Burnham." Social Science History 1986 10(3): 221–245. ISSN 0145-5532
- Brady, David, and Joseph Stewart, Jr. "Congressional Party Realignment and Transformations of Public Policy in Three Realignment Eras", American Journal of Political Science, Vol. 26, No. 2 (May, 1982), pp. 333–360 JSTOR 2111043 Looks at links among cross-cutting issues, electoral realignments, the U.S. House and public policy changes during the Civil War, 1890s and New Deal realignments. In each case the policy changes are voted through by a partisan "new" majority party. The Civil War and 1890s realignments were more polarized than was the New Deal realignment, and the extent of party structuring of issue dimensions was greater.
- Burnham, Walter Dean. "Periodization Schemes and 'Party Systems': The 'System of 1896' as a Case in Point" Social Science History, Vol. 10, No. 3, 263–314.
- Campbell, James E. "Party Systems and Realignments in the United States, 1868–2004", Social Science History Fall 2006, Vol. 30 Issue 3, pp. 359–386
- Chambers, William Nisbet, and Walter Dean Burnham, eds. The American Party Systems. Stages of Political Development, (1967)
- Chambers, William Nisbet. Political Parties in a New Nation: The American Experience, 1776–1809 (1963)
- Hofstadter, Richard. The Idea of a Party System: The Rise of Legitimate Opposition in the United States, 1780–1840 (1970)
- James, Scott C. Presidents, Parties, and the State: A Party System Perspective on Democratic Regulatory Choice, 1884–1936 (2000)
- Jensen, Richard. "American Election Analysis: A Case History of Methodological Innovation and Diffusion", in S. M. Lipset, ed, Politics and the Social Sciences (Oxford University Press, 1969), 226–243.
- Jensen, Richard. "History and the Political Scientist", in S. M. Lipset, ed, Politics and the Social Sciences (Oxford University Press, 1969), 1–28.
- Jensen, Richard. "Historiography of Political History", in Jack Greene ed., Encyclopedia of American Political History (Scribners, 1984), 1:1–25.
- Jensen, Richard. "The Changing Shape of Burnham's Political Universe", Social Science History 10 (1986) 209–219 ISSN 0145-5532
- Renda, Lex. "Richard P. McCormick and the Second American Party System." Reviews in American History (1995) 23(2): 378–389. ISSN 0048-7511
- Sundquist, James L. Dynamics of the party system: Alignment and realignment of political parties in the United States (1983)
