= Grigorii Golosov =

Russian political scientist

- Григорий Голосов
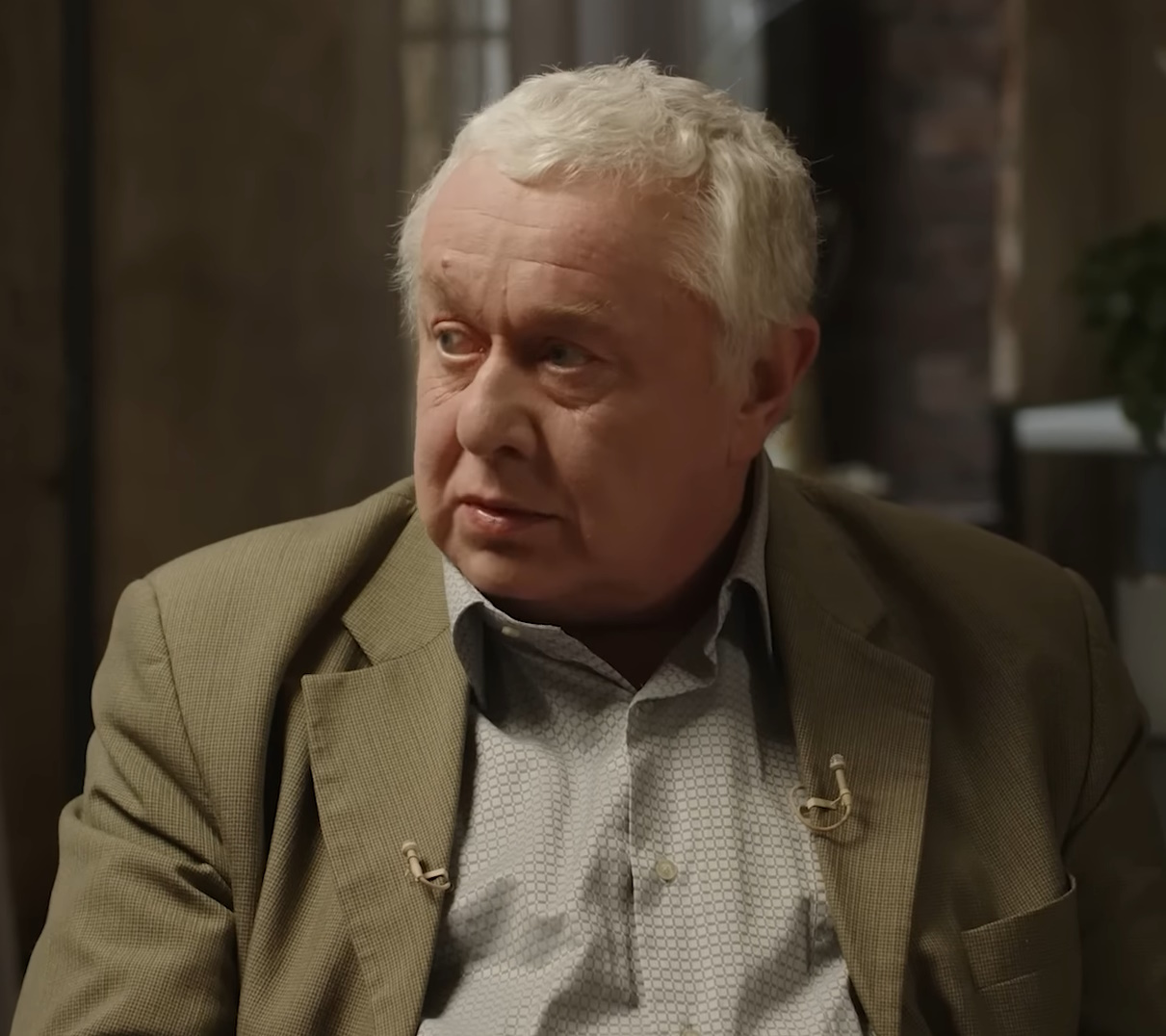
- Golosov in March 2024
- Born: Grigorii Vasilyevich Golosov; April 30, 1963 (age 63); Ust-Kamenogorsk, Soviet Kazakhstan, USSR
- Awards: Lawrence Longley Award (2004); Outstanding Academic Title (2004); CEU Alumni Impact Award for Outstanding Career Achievement (2016); Shortlisted for the Politprosvet special book prize (2025)

Academic background
- Education: Novosibirsk State University (Specialist, Candidate of Sciences); Central European University (Master of Arts); Russian Academy of Sciences (Doctor of Sciences)
- Thesis: Formation and Development of the Russian Party System: A Comparative Analysis (1999)

Academic work
- Discipline: Political science
- Institutions: Novosibirsk State University (1987—1995); European University at Saint Petersburg (since 1996); University of California, Berkeley (1995—1996); University of Notre Dame (1998); University of Oslo (1998); Central European University (2001); Sciences Po (2001); Woodrow Wilson International Center for Scholars (2002—2003)
- Main interests: Political science, political philosophy, comparative politics
- Notable ideas: New formula for effective number of parties, new classification of party systems, methodology of cross-regional political analysis

Grigorii Vasilyevich Golosov (Russian: Григорий Васильевич Голосов), sometimes spelled as Grigory Golosov, is a Russian political scientist. He is a professor and the head of the political science department at the European University at Saint Petersburg, Russia. He is an expert on political institutions and electoral systems, in particular, in application to Russia. His article "Electoral Systems and Party Formation in Russia" (Comparative Political Studies, Vol. 36, No. 8, October 2003, pp. 912–935) received a Lawrence Longley Award from the American Political Science Association for the best journal article on electoral systems and representation published in 2003. Research.com, an educational platform and research portal that provides data-driven rankings of universities, top scientists, and scholarly publications, lists him as the best political scientist in Russia in its 2025/2026 rating.

== Biography ==
Grigorii Golosov was born in 1963. After his doctoral studies, from 1987 to 1995, he worked at Novosibirsk State University. He has been working at the European University at Saint Petersburg since 1996. From August 2002 to May 2003, he was a residential fellow at the Woodrow Wilson International Center for Scholars. He is a member of the editorial boards of Party Politics, Europe-Asia Studies, Slavic Review, Problems of Post-Communism, and several other national and international journals.

== Publications ==
=== Books in English ===
- Authoritarian Party Systems: Party Politics in Autocratic Regimes, 1945–2019 (2022).
- Political Parties in the Regions of Russia: Democracy Unclaimed (2004).

=== Books in Russian ===
- Партийные системы России и стран Восточной Европы: генезис, структуры, динамика (1999).
- Российская партийная система и региональная политика (2006).
- Демократия в России: инструкция по сборке (2012).
- Сравнительная политология и российская политика, 2010-2015 (2016).
- Сравнительная политология: Учебник, 4-е изд, перераб. и доп (2018).
- Автократия, или Одиночество власти (2019).
- Политические режимы и трансформации: Россия в сравнительной перспективе (2024).

=== Most cited articles ===
- "The Effective Number of Parties: A New Approach", Party Politics, Vol. 16, No. 2, March 2010, pp. 171–192.
- "Russia's Regional Legislative Elections, 2003-2007: Authoritarianism Incorporated", Europe-Asia Studies, Vol. 63, No. 3, May 2011, pp. 397–414

=== Recent articles ===
- "Measuring Electoral Disproportionality in Two-Round Majority Systems: A New Index with an Application to France", French Politics, Vol. 24, No. 3, September 2026, pp. 494-510.
- "Electoral Systems and Electoral Integrity: A Cross-National and Cross-Temporal Analysis With Policy Implications", Political Research Quarterly, 4 September 2026, doi: 10.1177/10659129261486877.
- "Simulating Election Results and Party Systems", International Political Science Review, 28 July 2026, doi: 10.1177/01925121261465448.
- "District-Level Determinants of National Party System Fragmentation: A Quantitative Theoretical Study with Implications for Empirical Research", Quality & Quantity, 3 July 2026, doi: 10.1007/s11135-026-02947-z.
- "Populist Electoral Success and Party System Concentration: A Cross-National Analysis", Party Politics, 22 May 2026, doi: 10.1177/13540688261454105, with V. Surdea-Hernea.
- "Bonuses and Penalties in Vote to Seat Conversion under Single-Member Plurality Electoral Rules in a Cross-National Perspective: How Large, and Why?", Acta Politica, 14 March 2026, doi: 10.1057/s41269-026-00419-8.
- "Measuring Two-Partyness: An Overview and a New Index with Minimum Data Requirements", Political Research Quarterly, Vol. 79, No. 1, 2026, pp. 44–61.
- ""Resistance at the Polls: Coordinated Anti-regime Voting in Russia’s Transition from Competitive to Hegemonic Authoritarianism, 2019–2021", Democratization, Vol. 33, No. 2, 2026, pp. 369–391, with M. Turchenko and M. Zavadskaya.
- "Electoral Rules and the Two-party System: A Methodological Inquiry with Reference to Duverger's Law", International Political Science Review, Vol. 46, No. 3, 2025, pp. 388–405.
