= List of countries without political parties =

This list of countries without political parties includes countries and dependencies with permanent populations that have no registered political parties. Some have opposition groups that operate clandestinely.

== Monarchies ==
- Bahrain — Political parties are banned; candidates must be independent.
- Kuwait — Political parties are banned; candidates must be independent.
- Oman — Political parties are banned; candidates must be independent.
- Qatar — Political parties are banned; candidates must be independent.
- Saudi Arabia — Political parties are banned; candidates must be independent.
- Tuvalu
- United Arab Emirates — Political parties are banned; candidates must be independent.

== Theocracies ==
- Afghanistan — Political parties are banned under the current Taliban government.
- Vatican City

== Republics ==
- Burkina Faso — Political parties are banned under the current military junta.
- Federated States of Micronesia
- Palau

== Subnational entities ==
- Canada:
  - Northwest Territories
  - Nunavut
  - Almost every municipal government in the country
- United Kingdom:
  - Falkland Islands
  - Pitcairn Islands
  - Saint Helena, Ascension and Tristan da Cunha
  - Almost every Parish Council local government in the country.
- Australia:
  - Christmas Island
  - Cocos (Keeling) Islands
  - Norfolk Island
- New Zealand:
  - Tokelau
- United States:
  - Nebraska – The Nebraska Legislature is non-partisan
  - Many municipal governments

== Former entities ==
- Confederate States of America — Even though political parties were not banned, the Confederate Congress did not have any political parties.
- (Poland) Polish government-in-exile — There were no official political parties, but several unofficial political factions existed.
- (Libya) Libyan Arab Jamahiriya
- (Japan) Japanese Empire
