= Moisey Ostrogorsky =

Russian politician and sociologist (1854–1921)

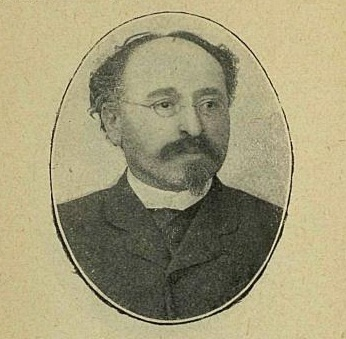
- Born: 1854; Grodno Governorate
- Died: 10 February 1921 (aged 66–67); Petrograd

Moisey Yakovlevich Ostrogorsky (also Moisei Ostrogorski; Russian: Моисе́й Я́ковлевич Острого́рский, romanized: Moisey Yakovlevich Ostrogorskiy; Belarusian: Майсей Якаўлевiч Aстрaгорскi, romanized: Majsiej Jakaŭlievič Astrahorski; 1854 – 10 February 1921) was a Russian politician, political scientist, historian, jurist and sociologist. Along with Max Weber and Robert Michels, he is considered one of the founders of political sociology, especially in the field of theories about party systems and political parties. Ostrogorski noted that loyalty to parties is often comparable to loyalty to one's religion. He was a member of the First State Duma of the Russian Empire representing the Grodno province in 1906–1907.

== Biography ==
Moisey Ostrogorsky was born to a Lithuanian Jewish family in 1854 in the Grodno province of the Russian Empire (now in the Belarus), where he grew up. He studied law at Saint Petersburg State University and worked for the Russian justice ministry.

He represented Grodno province in the First State Duma (Parliament of the Russian Empire).

In the 1880s, he went to Paris and studied at the École Libre des Sciences Politiques, where he wrote his dissertation Les origines du suffrage universel (The origins of universal suffrage) (1885). Whilst in France, Ostrogorski imbibed French political thought, which was distrustful of an all-powerful state, from thinkers such as Comte, Durkheim, Tocqueville, Saint Simon and Proudhon.

He traveled to the United States and Great Britain. In 1902, he published Democracy and the Organization of Political Parties (originally in French), which compared the political system of the two nations. After returning to Russia in 1906, he became the Duma representative for the Hrodna province as a member of the liberal Constitutional Democratic Party. He left politics after the Duma was dissolved during the Russian Revolution.

As a political thinker, he was recognized in the West before he was in Russia. Ostrogorski has been influential on the political thought of the 20th century.

After leaving politics, he taught at the Psychoneurological Institute in St. Petersburg.

He died on 10 February 1921 in St. Petersburg, now renamed Petrograd.

=== Work on political science ===
Ostrogorski's main work is La democratie et l'organisation des partis politiques. He noted behavioural determinism in organisational structure: "As soon as a party, even if created for the noblest object perpetuates itself, it tends to degeneration", which influenced "the later researches of Max Weber, Robert Michels, and Andre Siegfried".

Ostrogorski is also the author of a book that is about the equality of the sexes: La Femme au point de vue du droit public.

Ostrogorski's paradox is named after him.

== Works ==
As a lawyer:

- The Legal Calendar (1876).
- The Cassation Practice for a Year (1881).

As a historian:

- Chronology of Russian History (1872).
- Chronology of General and Russian History (1873).
- Brief Chronology of General and Russian History (1873).
- History of Russia for National Schools (1891).
- The Textbook of Russian History for III Class of Grammar Schools (1891).

As a political scientist:

- The Rights of Women. A Comparative Study in History and Legislation, Swan Sonnenschein, 1893, ASIN B0017ATBZ2
- La Démocratie et l'Organisation des Partis Politiques, 1903 ASIN B0017GB4II
  - La Démocratie et l'Organisation des Partis politiques, 1912 [Nouvelle édition, refondue]. ASIN B0017GEMIC
  - Democracy And The Organization Of Political Parties, vol. 1 and vol. 2, Macmillan and Company, 1902 [Translated from the French by F. Clarke]. ASIN B0017AP8AE
- Democracy and the Party System in the United States, The Macmillan Company, 1910.

Articles:

- "Woman Suffrage in Local Self-Government," Political Science Quarterly, Vol. 6, No. 4, Dec. 1891.
- "The Introduction of the Caucus into England," Political Science Quarterly, Vol. 8, No. 2, Jun. 1893.
- "The Rise and Fall of the Nominating Caucus, Legislative and Congressional," The American Historical Review, Vol. 5, No. 2, Dec. 1899.
