= European Democratic Union =

Former centre-right political group of the European Parliament

- European Parliament group
- Name: European Democratic Union
- English abbr.: n/a
- French abbr.: UDE
- Formal name: European Democratic Union Group
- Ideology: Gaullism
- From: 21 January 1965
- To: 16 January 1973
- Preceded by: new creation
- Succeeded by: Group of European Progressive Democrats
- Chaired by: Louis Terrenoire (1966), Jean-Noël de Lipkowski (1967), Raymond Triboulet (1968)
- MEP(s): 15 (1965/66)

The European Democratic Union Group was a Gaullist political group with seats in the European Parliament between 1965 and 1973.

== History ==
The French Gaullists split from the Liberal Group on 21 January 1965 and created a new Group called the "European Democratic Union", (not to be confused with the association of Conservative and Christian Democrat parties founded in 1978 called the "European Democrat Union" or "EDU", nor the Conservative Group called the "European Democratic Group" founded in 1979). The Group was renamed on 16 January 1973 to the "Group of European Progressive Democrats" when the Gaullists were joined by the Irish Fianna Fáil.

== Sources ==
- Archive of European Integration
- Konrad-Adenauer-Stiftung
- Europe Politique
- European Parliament MEP Archives
- Centre Virtuel de la Connaissance sur l'Europe (CVCE) via European NAvigator
