= Effective number of parties =

Concept in political party systems

Some political scientists use the effective number of parties as a diversity index. Also knownas Laakso-Taagepera index, the measure as introduced by Laakso and Rein Taagepera (1979), produces an adjusted number of political parties in a country's party system, weighted by their relative size. The measure is useful when comparing party systems across countries.

A jurisdiction's party system can be measured by either:

1. The effective number of electoral parties (ENEP) weights parties by their share of the vote.
2. The effective number of parliamentary parties (ENPP) weights parties by their share of seats in the legislature.

The number of parties equals the effective number of parties only when all parties have equal strength. In any other case, the effective number of parties is smaller than the number of actual parties. The effective number of parties is a frequent operationalization for political fragmentation. Conversely, political concentration can be seen by the share of power held large political parties.

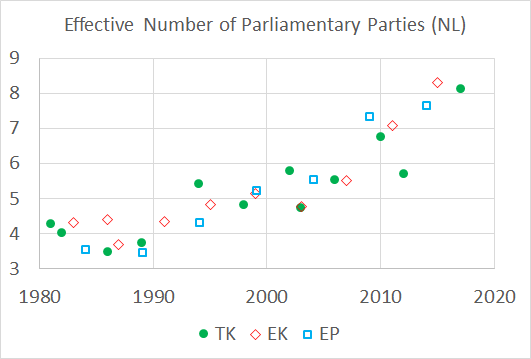
Example of how the effective number of parties shows the fragmentation of the Dutch political landscape (1981–2017)

Several common alternative methods are used to define the effective number of parties. John K. Wildgen's index of "hyperfractionalization" accords special weight to small parties. Juan Molinar's index gives special weight to the largest party. Dunleavy and Boucek provide a useful critique of the Molinar index.

== Measures ==
=== Quadratic ===
Laakso and Taagepera (1979) were the first to define the effective number of parties using the following formula:

$$N = \frac{1}{\sum_{i=1}^n p_i^2}$$

where n is the number of parties with at least one vote/seat and $p_i^2$ the square of each party's proportion of all votes or seats. This is also the formula for the inverse Simpson index, or the true diversity of order 2. This definition is still the most commonly used in political science.

This measure is equivalent to the Herfindahl–Hirschman index, used in economics; the Simpson diversity index in ecology; the inverse participation ratio (IPR) in physics; and the Rényi entropy of order $\alpha = 2$ in information theory.

=== Alternatives ===
An alternative formula was proposed by Grigorii Golosov in 2010.

$$N = \sum_{i=1}^n \frac{p_i}{p_i+p_1^2-p_i^2}$$

which is equivalent – if we only consider parties with at least one vote/seat – to

$$N = \sum_{i=1}^n \frac{1}{1+(p_1^2/p_i)-p_i}$$

Here, n is the number of parties, $p_i^2$ the square of each party's proportion of all votes or seats, and $p_1^2$ is the square of the largest party's proportion of all votes or seats.

== Values ==
The following table illustrates the difference between the values produced by the two formulas for eight hypothetical vote or seat constellations:

Fractional shares	N, Laakso-Taagepera	N, Golosov
0.75, 0.25	1.60	1.33
0.75, 0.1, 15 at 0.01	1.74	1.42
0.55, 0.45	1.98	1.82
0.55, 3 at 0.1, 15 at 0.01	2.99	2.24
2 at 0.35, 0.3	2.99	2.90
0.35, 5 at 0.1, 15 at 0.01	5.75	4.49
6 at 0.15, 0.1	6.90	6.89
0.15, 7 at 0.1, 15 at 0.01	10.64	11.85

== Seat product model ==
The effective number of parties can be predicted with the seat product model as $N = (MS)^{1/6}$, where M is the district magnitude and S is the assembly size.

== Effective number of parties by country ==
For individual countries the values of effective number of number of parliamentary parties (ENPP) for the last available election is shown. Some of the highest effective number of parties are in Brazil, Belgium, and Bosnia and Herzegovina. European Parliament has an even higher effective number of parties if national parties are considered, yet a much lower effective number of parties if political groups of the European Parliament are considered.

Country	Year	Effective number of parties in parliament
Albania	2025	2.08
Andorra	2023	2.36
Angola	2022	2.06
Anguilla	2025	1.66
Antigua and Barbuda	2023	2.43
Argentina	2023	3.04
Armenia	2021	1.93
Aruba	2024	2.85
Australia	2025	2.37
Austria	2024	4.13
Bahamas	2021	1.42
Bangladesh	2001	2.16
Barbados	2022	1.00
Belgium	2024	9.23
Belize	2025	1.39
Benin	2023	2.71
Bermuda	2020	1.38
Bhutan	2023-24	1.86
Bolivia	2020	2.28
Bosnia and Herzegovina	2022	9.00
Botswana	2024	2.38
Brazil	2022	9.91
Bulgaria	2024 October	6.07
Burkina Faso	2020	4.11
Cabo Verde	2021	2.20
Canada	2025	2.36
Cayman Islands	2025	4.25
Chile	2021	4.13
Colombia	2022	8.74
Costa Rica	2022	4.90
Croatia	2024	3.46
Curaçao	2025	2.28
Cyprus	2021	4.81
Czech Republic	2021	3.34
Denmark	2022	7.24
Dominica	2022	1.21
Dominican Republic	2020	2.75
El Salvador	2024	1.23
Estonia	2023	4.52
Ethiopia	2021	1.07
Faeroe Islands	2022	5.07
Fiji	2022	2.63
Finland	2023	5.56
France	2024	4.33
Gambia	2022	4.80
Georgia	2024	2.53
Germany	2025	5.11
Ghana	2024	1.83
Gibraltar	2023	1.99
Greece	2023	3.09
Greenland	2025	4.12
Grenada	2022	1.92
Guatemala	2023	7.26
Guinea	2020	2.06
Guinea-Bissau	2023	2.64
Guyana	2020	2.06
Honduras	2021	3.26
Hungary	2022	1.84
Iceland	2024	5.43
India	2024	2.10
Indonesia	2024	7.26
Ireland	2024	5.48
Israel	2022	6.51
Italy	2022	2.40
Jamaica	2020	1.53
Japan	2024	3.52
Kosovo	Feb 2025	4.22
Latvia	2022	6.14
Lesotho	2022	3.42
Liberia	2023	6.44
Liechtenstein	2025	3.31
Lithuania	2024	4.62
Luxembourg	2023	4.43
Malawi	2019	5.19
Malaysia	2022	3.60
Malta	2022	1.97
Mauritius	2024	1.21
Mexico	2024	1.67
Moldova	2021	2.03
Monaco	2023	1.00
Mongolia	2024	2.45
Montenegro	2023	4.85
Morocco	2021	5.68
Mozambique	2024	1.96
Namibia	2024	2.97
Nepal	2022	4.75
Netherlands	2025	8.16
New Zealand	2023	3.81
Niger	2020-21	3.85
North Cyprus	2022	2.71
North Macedonia	2024	3.36
Northern Ireland	2022	4.52
Norway	2021	5.56
Panama	2024	4.50
Paraguay	2023	2.68
Peru	2021	6.20
Poland	2023	3.13
Portugal	2025	3.58
Romania	2024	6.36
Russia	2021	1.85
Saint Kitts and Nevis	2022	2.57
Saint Lucia	2021	1.65
Saint Vincent and the Grenadines	2020	1.92
San Marino	2024	3.28
Sao Tome and Principe	2022	2.41
Scotland	2026	3.77
Senegal	2024	1.58
Serbia	2023	2.90
Seychelles	2020	1.69
Sierra Leone	2023	1.92
Singapore	2025	1.27
Sint Maarten	2024 August	6.08
Slovakia	2023	5.44
Slovenia	2022	3.04
South Africa	2024	4.19
South Korea	2024	2.10
Spain	2023	3.44
Sri Lanka	2024	1.88
Suriname	2025	3.76
Sweden	2022	5.18
Switzerland	2023	5.13
Taiwan	2024	2.38
Thailand	2023	4.86
Timor-Leste	2023	3.02
Trinidad and Tobago	2025	1.98
Turkey	2023	2.35
Turks and Caicos Islands	2025	1.38
Uganda	2021	2.34
Ukraine	2019	2.64
United Kingdom	2024	2.24
United States	2024 House	2.00
United States	2024 Electoral college	1.95
Uruguay	2024	2.85
Vanuatu	2025	9.14
Venezuela	2020	1.17
Wales	2026	2.94
Zambia	2021	2.35

== See also ==
- Duverger's law – Winner-takes-all voting systems tend to result in only two viable parties
- First-past-the-post voting – Plurality voting system
- Majoritarian representation – System favoring larger parties over smaller ones
- Multi-party system – Political system with three or more parties
- One-party state – State where only one party may form a government
- Proportional representation – Voting system that makes outcomes proportional to vote totals
- Two-party system – Government system dominated by only two major political parties
- Vote splitting – Election result affecting losing candidate
- Electoral competition – Competition between political parties or candidates
- Micromega rule – Preferences of political parties for electoral systems

== Sources ==
- Badie, Bertrand; Berg-Schlosser, Dirk; Morlino, Leonardo, eds. (2011). "Party System Fragmentation". International Encyclopedia of Political Science. Thousand Oaks, CA: SAGE Publications. pp. 1822–1824. doi:10.4135/9781412959636.n419. ISBN 978-1-4129-5963-6.
