= Political fragmentation =

Political process

Political fragmentation is the division of the political landscape into so many different parties and groups that the governance might become inefficient. Political fragmentation can apply to political parties, political groups or other political organisations. It is most often operationalized using the effective number of parliamentary parties.

== Effects of political fragmentation ==
Scholars, journalists, and politicians have theorized about a number of potential effects of political fragmentation. For example, it has been argued that higher fragmentation allows voters to better represent their political spectrum of political positions. The length of government coalition formation has also been argued to increase with number of parties and decreases with preexisting political groups. The strength of these effects has been hypothesized to depend on whether it is the government or the opposition that are fragmented. However, the political fragmentation of parliaments has little causal effect on a number of dimensions of the quality of democracy. The veto player theory predicts that higher fragmentation relates to gridlock, but other literature does not observe increased gridlock.

While one-party states are authoritarian, dominant-party systems can be democratic.

== Factors affecting level of political fragmentation ==
The political fragmentation, represented by effective number of parties, is roughly estimated with the seat product model, and increases with district magnitude and assembly size. The political fragmentation tends to move towards an equilibrium, depending on the voting system. Duverger's law predicts majoritarian elections with district magnitude of one favor a two-party system and proportional representation increases the number of parties. In proportional representation, higher electoral thresholds tend to reduce the number of parties since voters voting for smaller parties have a higher risk of having their votes wasted.

Strong autocrats can prefer a fragmented political system, while weaker autocrats can prefer a low level of party fragmentation.

== Sources ==
- Pildes, Richard H. (2022). "Political Fragmentation and the Decline of Effective Government". In Jackson, V.C.; Dawood, Y. (eds.). Constitutionalism and a Right to Effective Government. Comparative Constitutional Law and Policy. Cambridge University Press. pp. 235–246. doi:10.2139/ssrn.3868421. SSRN 3868421.
