= 1960 United States census =

18th United States national census

Eighteenth census of the United States
- April 1, 1960
- U.S. Census Bureau seal

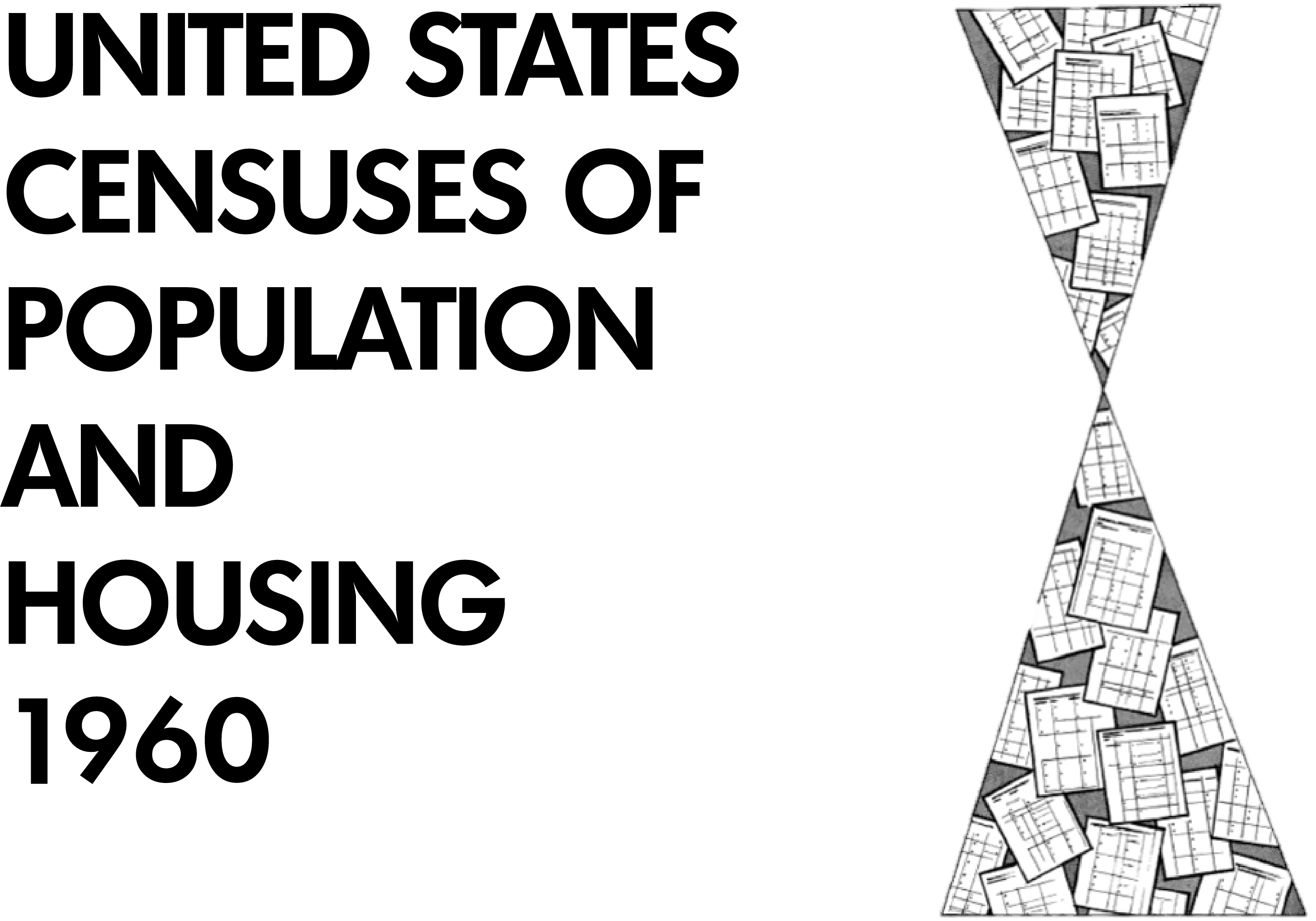
- 1960 U.S. census logo

General information
- Country: United States

Results
- Total population: 179,323,175 (▲19%)
- Most populous state: New York; 16,782,304
- Least populous state: Alaska; 226,167

The 1960 United States census, conducted by the Census Bureau, determined the resident population of the United States to be 179,323,175, an increase of 19 percent over the 151,325,798 persons enumerated during the 1950 census. This was the first census in which all states recorded a population of over 200,000. This census's data determined the electoral votes for the 1964 and 1968 presidential elections. This was also the last census in which New York was the most populous state.

Detroit lost 220,000 residents in the 1950s, which remains the record for the largest loss of population between two censuses.

== Census questions ==
The 1960 census collected the following information from all respondents:

- Address
- Name
- Relationship to Head of Household
- Sex
- Race
- Age
- Marital Status

Approximately 25% of households received a "long form" of the 1960 census, which contained over 100 questions. Full documentation on the 1960 census, including census forms and a procedural history, is available from the Integrated Public Use Microdata Series.

== Data availability ==
Microdata from the 1960 census are freely available through the Integrated Public Use Microdata Series. Aggregate data for small areas, together with electronic boundary files, can be downloaded from the National Historical Geographic Information System. Personally identifiable information will be available in 2032.

== State rankings ==
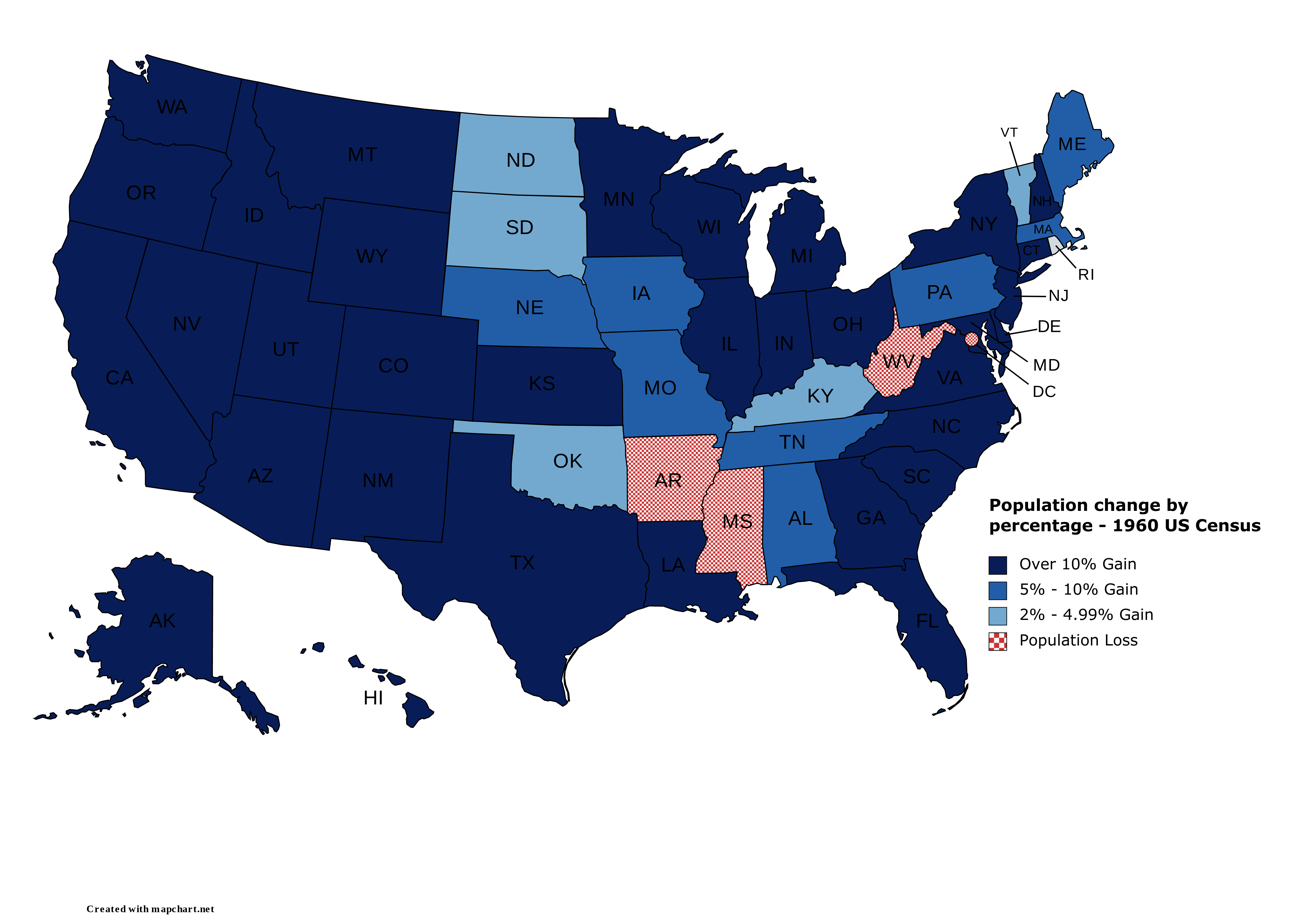
A map showing the population change of each US State by percentage.

Rank	State	Population as of 1960 census	Population as of 1950 census	Change	Percent change
1	New York	16,782,304	14,830,192	1,952,112 ▲	13.2% ▲
2	California	15,717,204	10,586,223	5,130,981 ▲	48.5% ▲
3	Pennsylvania	11,319,366	10,498,012	821,354 ▲	7.8% ▲
4	Illinois	10,081,158	8,712,176	1,368,982 ▲	15.7% ▲
5	Ohio	9,706,397	7,946,627	1,759,770 ▲	22.1% ▲
6	Texas	9,579,677	7,711,194	1,868,483 ▲	24.2% ▲
7	Michigan	7,823,194	6,371,766	1,451,428 ▲	22.8% ▲
8	New Jersey	6,066,782	4,835,329	1,231,453 ▲	25.5% ▲
9	Massachusetts	5,148,578	4,690,514	458,064 ▲	9.8% ▲
10	Florida	4,951,560	2,771,305	2,180,255 ▲	78.7% ▲
11	Indiana	4,662,498	3,934,224	728,274 ▲	18.5% ▲
12	North Carolina	4,556,155	4,061,929	494,226 ▲	12.2% ▲
13	Missouri	4,319,813	3,954,653	365,160 ▲	9.2% ▲
14	Virginia	3,966,949	3,318,680	648,269 ▲	19.5% ▲
15	Wisconsin	3,951,777	3,434,575	517,202 ▲	15.1% ▲
16	Georgia	3,943,116	3,444,578	498,538 ▲	14.5% ▲
17	Tennessee	3,567,089	3,291,718	275,371 ▲	8.4% ▲
18	Minnesota	3,413,864	2,982,483	431,381 ▲	14.5% ▲
19	Alabama	3,266,740	3,061,743	204,997 ▲	6.7% ▲
20	Louisiana	3,257,022	2,683,516	573,506 ▲	21.4% ▲
21	Maryland	3,100,689	2,343,001	757,688 ▲	32.3% ▲
22	Kentucky	3,038,156	2,944,806	93,350 ▲	3.2% ▲
23	Washington	2,853,214	2,378,963	474,251 ▲	19.9% ▲
24	Iowa	2,757,537	2,621,073	136,464 ▲	5.2% ▲
25	Connecticut	2,535,234	2,007,280	527,954 ▲	26.3% ▲
26	South Carolina	2,382,594	2,117,027	265,567 ▲	12.5% ▲
27	Oklahoma	2,328,284	2,233,351	94,933 ▲	4.3% ▲
28	Kansas	2,178,611	1,905,299	273,312 ▲	14.3% ▲
29	Mississippi	2,178,141	2,178,914	−773 ▼	−0.0% ▼
30	West Virginia	1,860,421	2,005,552	−145,131 ▼	−7.2% ▼
31	Arkansas	1,786,272	1,909,511	−123,239 ▼	−6.5% ▼
32	Oregon	1,768,687	1,521,341	247,346 ▲	16.3% ▲
33	Colorado	1,753,947	1,325,089	428,858 ▲	32.4% ▲
34	Nebraska	1,411,330	1,325,510	85,820 ▲	6.5% ▲
35	Arizona	1,302,161	749,587	552,574 ▲	73.7% ▲
36	Maine	969,265	913,774	55,491 ▲	6.1% ▲
37	New Mexico	951,023	681,187	269,836 ▲	39.6% ▲
38	Utah	890,627	688,862	201,765 ▲	29.3% ▲
39	Rhode Island	859,488	791,896	67,592 ▲	8.5% ▲
—	District of Columbia	763,956	802,178	−38,222 ▼	−4.8% ▼
40	South Dakota	680,514	652,740	27,774 ▲	4.3% ▲
41	Montana	674,767	591,024	83,743 ▲	14.2% ▲
42	Idaho	667,191	588,637	78,554 ▲	13.3% ▲
43	Hawaii	632,772	499,794	132,978 ▲	26.6% ▲
44	North Dakota	632,446	619,636	12,810 ▲	2.1% ▲
45	New Hampshire	606,921	533,242	73,679 ▲	13.8% ▲
46	Delaware	446,292	318,085	128,207 ▲	40.3% ▲
47	Vermont	389,881	377,747	12,134 ▲	3.2% ▲
48	Wyoming	330,066	290,529	39,537 ▲	13.6% ▲
49	Nevada	285,278	160,083	125,195 ▲	78.2% ▲
50	Alaska	226,167	128,643	97,524 ▲	75.8% ▲
—	United States	179,323,175	151,325,798	27,997,377 ▲	18.5% ▲

== City rankings ==
Rank	City	State	Population	Region (2016)
01	New York	New York	7,781,984	Northeast
02	Chicago	Illinois	3,550,404	Midwest
03	Los Angeles	California	2,479,015	West
04	Philadelphia	Pennsylvania	2,002,512	Northeast
05	Detroit	Michigan	1,670,144	Midwest
06	Baltimore	Maryland	939,024	South
07	Houston	Texas	938,219	South
08	Cleveland	Ohio	876,050	Midwest
09	Washington	District of Columbia	763,956	South
10	St. Louis	Missouri	750,026	Midwest
11	Milwaukee	Wisconsin	741,324	Midwest
12	San Francisco	California	740,316	West
13	Boston	Massachusetts	697,197	Northeast
14	Dallas	Texas	679,684	South
15	New Orleans	Louisiana	627,525	South
16	Pittsburgh	Pennsylvania	604,332	Northeast
17	San Antonio	Texas	587,718	South
18	San Diego	California	573,224	West
19	Seattle	Washington	557,087	West
20	Buffalo	New York	532,759	Northeast
21	Cincinnati	Ohio	502,550	Midwest
22	Memphis	Tennessee	497,524	South
23	Denver	Colorado	493,887	West
24	Atlanta	Georgia	487,455	South
25	Minneapolis	Minnesota	482,872	Midwest
26	Indianapolis	Indiana	476,258	Midwest
27	Kansas City	Missouri	475,539	Midwest
28	Columbus	Ohio	471,316	Midwest
29	Phoenix	Arizona	439,170	West
30	Newark	New Jersey	405,220	Northeast
31	Louisville	Kentucky	390,639	South
32	Portland	Oregon	372,676	West
33	Oakland	California	367,548	West
34	Fort Worth	Texas	356,268	South
35	Long Beach	California	344,168	West
36	Birmingham	Alabama	340,887	South
37	Oklahoma City	Oklahoma	324,253	South
38	Rochester	New York	318,611	Northeast
39	Toledo	Ohio	318,003	Midwest
40	Saint Paul	Minnesota	313,411	Midwest
41	Norfolk	Virginia	305,872	South
42	Omaha	Nebraska	301,598	Midwest
43	Honolulu	Hawaii	294,194	West
44	Miami	Florida	291,688	South
45	Akron	Ohio	290,351	Midwest
46	El Paso	Texas	276,687	South
47	Jersey City	New Jersey	276,101	Northeast
48	Tampa	Florida	274,970	South
49	Dayton	Ohio	262,332	Midwest
50	Tulsa	Oklahoma	261,685	South
51	Wichita	Kansas	254,698	Midwest
52	Richmond	Virginia	219,958	South
53	Syracuse	New York	216,038	Northeast
54	Tucson	Arizona	212,892	West
55	Des Moines	Iowa	208,982	Midwest
56	Providence	Rhode Island	207,498	Northeast
57	San Jose	California	204,196	West
58	Mobile	Alabama	202,779	South
59	Charlotte	North Carolina	201,564	South
60	Albuquerque	New Mexico	201,189	West
61	Jacksonville	Florida	201,030	South
62	Flint	Michigan	196,940	Midwest
63	Sacramento	California	191,667	West
64	Yonkers	New York	190,634	Northeast
65	Salt Lake City	Utah	189,454	West
66	Worcester	Massachusetts	186,587	Northeast
67	Austin	Texas	186,545	South
68	Spokane	Washington	181,608	West
69	St. Petersburg	Florida	181,298	South
70	Gary	Indiana	178,320	Midwest
71	Grand Rapids	Michigan	177,313	Midwest
72	Springfield	Massachusetts	174,463	Northeast
73	Nashville	Tennessee	170,874	South
74	Corpus Christi	Texas	167,690	South
75	Youngstown	Ohio	166,689	Midwest
76	Shreveport	Louisiana	164,372	South
77	Arlington	Virginia	163,401	South
78	Hartford	Connecticut	162,178	Northeast
79	Fort Wayne	Indiana	161,776	Midwest
80	Bridgeport	Connecticut	156,748	Northeast
81	Baton Rouge	Louisiana	152,419	South
82	New Haven	Connecticut	152,048	Northeast
83	Savannah	Georgia	149,245	South
84	Tacoma	Washington	147,979	West
85	Jackson	Mississippi	144,422	South
86	Paterson	New Jersey	143,663	Northeast
87	Evansville	Indiana	141,543	Midwest
88	Erie	Pennsylvania	138,440	Northeast
89	Amarillo	Texas	137,969	South
90	Montgomery	Alabama	134,393	South
91	Fresno	California	133,929	West
92	South Bend	Indiana	132,445	Midwest
93	Chattanooga	Tennessee	130,009	South
94	Albany	New York	129,726	Northeast
95	Lubbock	Texas	128,691	South
96	Lincoln	Nebraska	128,521	Midwest
97	Madison	Wisconsin	126,706	Midwest
97	Rockford	Illinois	126,706	Midwest
99	Kansas City	Kansas	121,901	Midwest
100	Greensboro	North Carolina	119,574	South

== Locations of 50 most populous cities ==
Location of 50 largest cities by population in the United States in 1960
