= 1940 United States census =

16th United States national census

Sixteenth census of the United States
- April 1, 1940
- U.S. Census Bureau seal

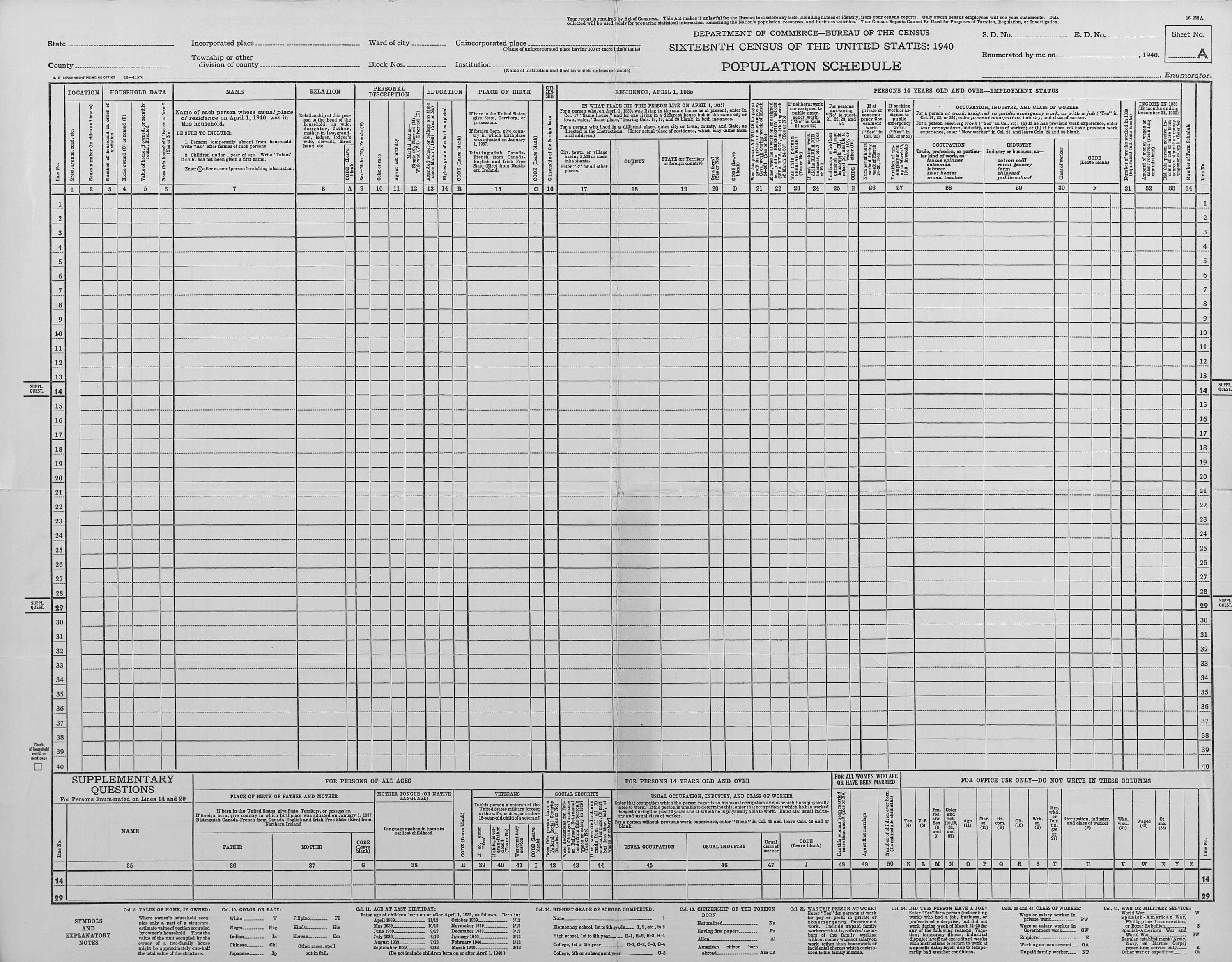
- Population schedule

General information
- Country: United States

Results
- Total population: 132,164,569 (▲7.6%)
- Most populous state: New York; 13,479,142
- Least populous state: Nevada; 110,247

The 1940 United States census, conducted by the Census Bureau, determined the resident population of the United States to be 132,164,569, an increase of 7.6 percent over the 1930 population of 122,775,046 people. The census date of record was April 1, 1940.

A number of new questions were asked including where people were five years before, highest educational grade achieved, and information about wages. This census introduced sampling techniques; one in 20 people were asked additional questions on the census form. Other innovations included a field test of the census in 1939. This was the first census in which every state (48) had a population greater than 100,000, and the first census to also include a "long form" (sent to only a subset of the households) with additional questions about socioeconomic and housing characteristics (the "long form" would be used for last time in the 2000 census, being replaced by American Community Survey afterwards).

== Census questions ==
The 1940 census collected the following information:

- address
- home owned or rented
  - if owned, value
  - if rented, monthly rent
- whether on a farm
- name
- relationship to head of household
- sex
- race
- age
- marital status
- school attendance
- educational attainment
- birthplace
- if foreign born, citizenship
- location of residence five years ago and whether on a farm
- employment status
- if at work, whether in private or non-emergency government work, or in public emergency work (WPA, CCC, NYA, etc.)
  - if in private or non-emergency government work, hours worked in week
  - if seeking work or on public emergency work, duration of unemployment
- occupation, industry and class of worker
- weeks worked last year
- wage and salary income last year

In addition, a sample of individuals were asked additional questions covering age at first marriage, fertility, and other topics. Full documentation on the 1940 census, including census forms and a procedural history, is available from the Integrated Public Use Microdata Series.

== Data availability ==
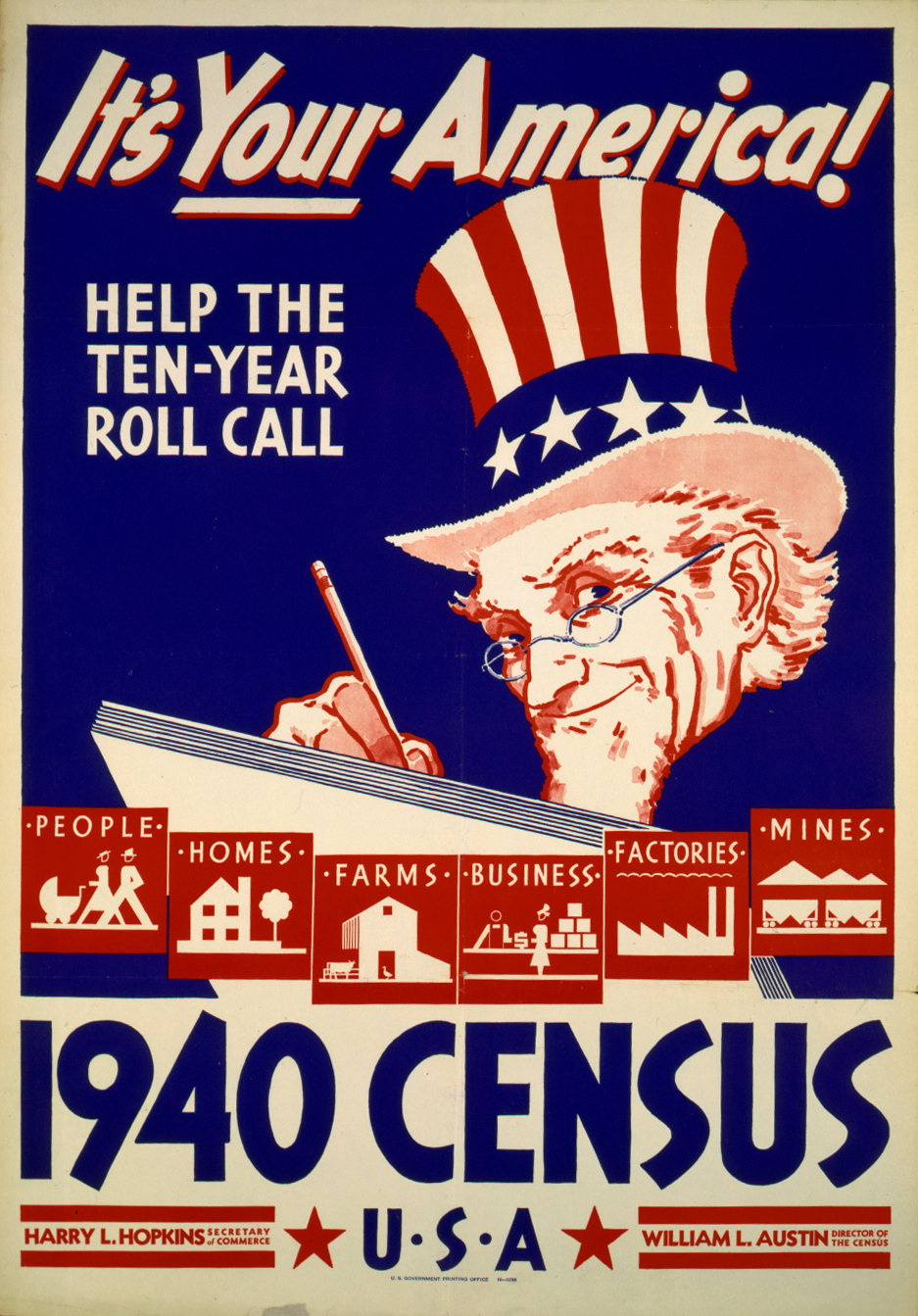
1940 U.S. census poster

Following completion of the census, the original enumeration sheets were microfilmed; after which the original sheets were destroyed.

As required by Title 13 of the U.S. Code, access to personally identifiable information from census records was restricted for 72 years. Non-personally identifiable information Microdata from the 1940 census is freely available through the Integrated Public Use Microdata Series. Also, aggregate data for small areas, together with electronic boundary files, can be downloaded from the National Historical Geographic Information System.

On April 2, 2012—72 years after the census was taken—microfilmed images of the 1940 census enumeration sheets were released to the public by the National Archives and Records Administration. The records are indexed only by enumeration district upon initial release; several organizations are compiling indices, in some cases through crowdsourcing.

== State rankings ==
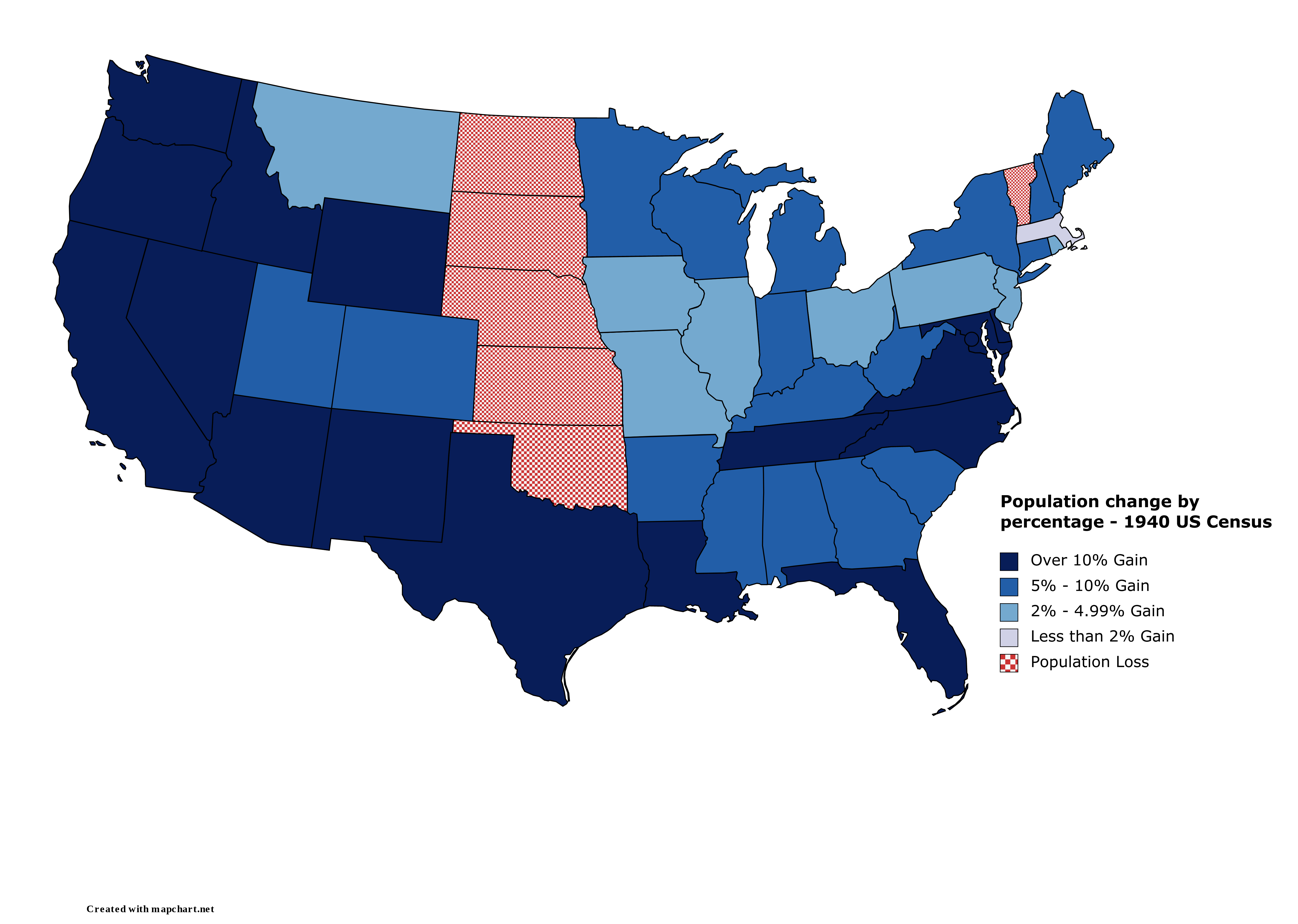
A map showing the population change of each US State by percentage.

| Rank | State | Population as of 1940 census | Population as of 1930 census | Change | Percent change |
|---|---|---|---|---|---|
| 1 | New York | 13,479,142 | 12,588,066 | 891,076 ▲ | 7.1% ▲ |
| 2 | Pennsylvania | 9,900,180 | 9,631,350 | 268,830 ▲ | 2.8% ▲ |
| 3 | Illinois | 7,897,241 | 7,630,654 | 266,587 ▲ | 3.5% ▲ |
| 4 | Ohio | 6,907,612 | 6,646,697 | 260,915 ▲ | 3.9% ▲ |
| 5 | California | 6,907,387 | 5,677,251 | 1,230,136 ▲ | 21.7% ▲ |
| 6 | Texas | 6,414,824 | 5,824,715 | 590,109 ▲ | 10.1% ▲ |
| 7 | Michigan | 5,256,106 | 4,842,325 | 413,781 ▲ | 8.5% ▲ |
| 8 | Massachusetts | 4,316,721 | 4,249,614 | 67,107 ▲ | 1.6% ▲ |
| 9 | New Jersey | 4,160,165 | 4,041,334 | 118,831 ▲ | 2.9% ▲ |
| 10 | Missouri | 3,784,664 | 3,629,367 | 155,297 ▲ | 4.3% ▲ |
| 11 | North Carolina | 3,571,623 | 3,170,276 | 401,347 ▲ | 12.7% ▲ |
| 12 | Indiana | 3,427,796 | 3,238,503 | 189,293 ▲ | 5.8% ▲ |
| 13 | Wisconsin | 3,137,587 | 2,939,006 | 198,581 ▲ | 6.8% ▲ |
| 14 | Georgia | 3,123,723 | 2,908,506 | 215,217 ▲ | 7.4% ▲ |
| 15 | Tennessee | 2,915,841 | 2,616,556 | 299,285 ▲ | 11.4% ▲ |
| 16 | Kentucky | 2,845,627 | 2,614,589 | 231,038 ▲ | 8.8% ▲ |
| 17 | Alabama | 2,832,961 | 2,646,248 | 186,713 ▲ | 7.1% ▲ |
| 18 | Minnesota | 2,792,300 | 2,563,953 | 228,347 ▲ | 8.9% ▲ |
| 19 | Virginia | 2,677,773 | 2,421,851 | 255,922 ▲ | 10.6% ▲ |
| 20 | Iowa | 2,538,268 | 2,470,939 | 67,329 ▲ | 2.7% ▲ |
| 21 | Louisiana | 2,363,516 | 2,101,593 | 261,923 ▲ | 12.5% ▲ |
| 22 | Oklahoma | 2,336,434 | 2,396,040 | −59,606 ▼ | −2.5% ▼ |
| 23 | Mississippi | 2,183,796 | 2,009,821 | 173,975 ▲ | 8.7% ▲ |
| 24 | Arkansas | 1,949,387 | 1,854,482 | 94,905 ▲ | 5.1% ▲ |
| 25 | West Virginia | 1,901,974 | 1,729,205 | 172,769 ▲ | 10.0% ▲ |
| 26 | South Carolina | 1,899,804 | 1,738,765 | 161,039 ▲ | 9.3% ▲ |
| 27 | Florida | 1,897,414 | 1,468,211 | 429,203 ▲ | 29.2% ▲ |
| 28 | Maryland | 1,821,244 | 1,631,526 | 189,718 ▲ | 11.6% ▲ |
| 29 | Kansas | 1,801,028 | 1,880,999 | −79,971 ▼ | −4.3% ▼ |
| 30 | Washington | 1,736,191 | 1,563,396 | 172,795 ▲ | 11.1% ▲ |
| 31 | Connecticut | 1,709,242 | 1,606,903 | 102,339 ▲ | 6.4% ▲ |
| 32 | Nebraska | 1,315,834 | 1,377,963 | −62,129 ▼ | −4.5% ▼ |
| 33 | Colorado | 1,123,296 | 1,035,791 | 87,505 ▲ | 8.4% ▲ |
| 34 | Oregon | 1,089,684 | 953,786 | 135,898 ▲ | 14.2% ▲ |
| 35 | Maine | 847,226 | 797,423 | 49,803 ▲ | 6.2% ▲ |
| 36 | Rhode Island | 713,346 | 687,497 | 25,849 ▲ | 3.8% ▲ |
| — | District of Columbia | 663,091 | 486,869 | 176,222 ▲ | 36.2% ▲ |
| 37 | South Dakota | 642,961 | 692,849 | −49,888 ▼ | −7.2% ▼ |
| 38 | North Dakota | 641,935 | 680,845 | −38,910 ▼ | −5.7% ▼ |
| 39 | Montana | 559,456 | 537,606 | 21,850 ▲ | 4.1% ▲ |
| 40 | Utah | 550,310 | 507,847 | 42,463 ▲ | 8.4% ▲ |
| 41 | New Mexico | 531,818 | 423,317 | 108,501 ▲ | 25.6% ▲ |
| 42 | Idaho | 524,873 | 445,032 | 79,841 ▲ | 17.9% ▲ |
| 43 | Arizona | 499,261 | 435,573 | 63,688 ▲ | 14.6% ▲ |
| 44 | New Hampshire | 491,524 | 465,293 | 26,231 ▲ | 5.6% ▲ |
| — | Hawaii | 422,770 | 368,300 | 54,470 ▲ | 14.8% ▲ |
| 45 | Vermont | 359,231 | 359,611 | −380 ▼ | −0.1% ▼ |
| 46 | Delaware | 266,505 | 238,380 | 28,125 ▲ | 11.8% ▲ |
| 47 | Wyoming | 250,742 | 225,565 | 25,177 ▲ | 11.2% ▲ |
| 48 | Nevada | 110,247 | 91,058 | 19,189 ▲ | 21.1% ▲ |
| — | Alaska | 72,524 | 59,278 | 13,246 ▲ | 22.3% ▲ |
| — | United States | 132,165,129 | 123,202,660 | 8,962,469 ▲ | 7.3% ▲ |

== City rankings ==
| Rank | City | State | Population | Region (2016) |
|---|---|---|---|---|
| 01 | New York | New York | 7,454,995 | Northeast |
| 02 | Chicago | Illinois | 3,396,808 | Midwest |
| 03 | Philadelphia | Pennsylvania | 1,931,334 | Northeast |
| 04 | Detroit | Michigan | 1,623,452 | Midwest |
| 05 | Los Angeles | California | 1,504,277 | West |
| 06 | Cleveland | Ohio | 878,336 | Midwest |
| 07 | Baltimore | Maryland | 859,100 | South |
| 08 | St. Louis | Missouri | 816,048 | Midwest |
| 09 | Boston | Massachusetts | 770,816 | Northeast |
| 10 | Pittsburgh | Pennsylvania | 671,659 | Northeast |
| 11 | Washington | District of Columbia | 663,091 | South |
| 12 | San Francisco | California | 634,536 | West |
| 13 | Milwaukee | Wisconsin | 587,472 | Midwest |
| 14 | Buffalo | New York | 575,901 | Northeast |
| 15 | New Orleans | Louisiana | 494,537 | South |
| 16 | Minneapolis | Minnesota | 492,370 | Midwest |
| 17 | Cincinnati | Ohio | 455,610 | Midwest |
| 18 | Newark | New Jersey | 429,760 | Northeast |
| 19 | Kansas City | Missouri | 399,178 | Midwest |
| 20 | Indianapolis | Indiana | 386,972 | Midwest |
| 21 | Houston | Texas | 384,514 | South |
| 22 | Seattle | Washington | 368,302 | West |
| 23 | Rochester | New York | 324,975 | Northeast |
| 24 | Denver | Colorado | 322,412 | West |
| 25 | Louisville | Kentucky | 319,077 | South |
| 26 | Columbus | Ohio | 306,087 | Midwest |
| 27 | Portland | Oregon | 305,394 | West |
| 28 | Atlanta | Georgia | 302,288 | South |
| 29 | Oakland | California | 302,163 | West |
| 30 | Jersey City | New Jersey | 301,173 | Northeast |
| 31 | Dallas | Texas | 294,734 | South |
| 32 | Memphis | Tennessee | 292,942 | South |
| 33 | Saint Paul | Minnesota | 287,736 | Midwest |
| 34 | Toledo | Ohio | 282,349 | Midwest |
| 35 | Birmingham | Alabama | 267,583 | South |
| 36 | San Antonio | Texas | 253,854 | South |
| 37 | Providence | Rhode Island | 253,504 | Northeast |
| 38 | Akron | Ohio | 244,791 | Midwest |
| 39 | Omaha | Nebraska | 223,844 | Midwest |
| 40 | Dayton | Ohio | 210,718 | Midwest |
| 41 | Syracuse | New York | 205,967 | Northeast |
| 42 | Oklahoma City | Oklahoma | 204,424 | South |
| 43 | San Diego | California | 203,341 | West |
| 44 | Worcester | Massachusetts | 193,694 | Northeast |
| 45 | Richmond | Virginia | 193,042 | South |
| 46 | Fort Worth | Texas | 177,662 | South |
| 47 | Jacksonville | Florida | 173,065 | South |
| 48 | Miami | Florida | 172,172 | South |
| 49 | Youngstown | Ohio | 167,720 | Midwest |
| 50 | Nashville | Tennessee | 167,402 | South |
| 51 | Hartford | Connecticut | 166,267 | Northeast |
| 52 | Grand Rapids | Michigan | 164,292 | Midwest |
| 53 | Long Beach | California | 164,271 | West |
| 54 | New Haven | Connecticut | 160,605 | Northeast |
| 55 | Des Moines | Iowa | 159,819 | Midwest |
| 56 | Flint | Michigan | 151,543 | Midwest |
| 57 | Salt Lake City | Utah | 149,934 | West |
| 58 | Springfield | Massachusetts | 149,554 | Northeast |
| 59 | Bridgeport | Connecticut | 147,121 | Northeast |
| 60 | Norfolk | Virginia | 144,332 | South |
| 61 | Yonkers | New York | 142,598 | Northeast |
| 62 | Tulsa | Oklahoma | 142,157 | South |
| 63 | Scranton | Pennsylvania | 140,404 | Northeast |
| 64 | Paterson | New Jersey | 139,656 | Northeast |
| 65 | Albany | New York | 130,577 | Northeast |
| 66 | Chattanooga | Tennessee | 128,163 | South |
| 67 | Trenton | New Jersey | 124,697 | Northeast |
| 68 | Spokane | Washington | 122,001 | West |
| 69 | Kansas City | Kansas | 121,458 | Midwest |
| 70 | Fort Wayne | Indiana | 118,410 | Midwest |
| 71 | Camden | New Jersey | 117,536 | Northeast |
| 72 | Erie | Pennsylvania | 116,955 | Northeast |
| 73 | Fall River | Massachusetts | 115,428 | Northeast |
| 74 | Wichita | Kansas | 114,966 | Midwest |
| 75 | Wilmington | Delaware | 112,504 | South |
| 76 | Gary | Indiana | 111,719 | Midwest |
| 77 | Knoxville | Tennessee | 111,580 | South |
| 78 | Cambridge | Massachusetts | 110,879 | Northeast |
| 79 | Reading | Pennsylvania | 110,568 | Northeast |
| 80 | New Bedford | Massachusetts | 110,341 | Northeast |
| 81 | Elizabeth | New Jersey | 109,912 | Northeast |
| 82 | Tacoma | Washington | 109,408 | West |
| 83 | Canton | Ohio | 108,401 | Midwest |
| 84 | Tampa | Florida | 108,391 | South |
| 85 | Sacramento | California | 105,958 | West |
| 86 | Peoria | Illinois | 105,087 | Midwest |
| 87 | Somerville | Massachusetts | 102,177 | Northeast |
| 88 | Lowell | Massachusetts | 101,389 | Northeast |
| 89 | South Bend | Indiana | 101,268 | Midwest |
| 90 | Duluth | Minnesota | 101,065 | Midwest |
| 91 | Charlotte | North Carolina | 100,899 | South |
| 92 | Utica | New York | 100,518 | Northeast |
| 93 | Waterbury | Connecticut | 99,314 | Northeast |
| 94 | Shreveport | Louisiana | 98,167 | South |
| 95 | Lynn | Massachusetts | 98,123 | Northeast |
| 96 | Evansville | Indiana | 97,062 | Midwest |
| 97 | Allentown | Pennsylvania | 96,904 | Northeast |
| 98 | El Paso | Texas | 96,810 | South |
| 99 | Savannah | Georgia | 95,996 | South |
| 100 | Little Rock | Arkansas | 88,039 | South |

== Locations of 50 most populous cities ==
Location of 50 largest cities by population in the United States in 1940.

== Use for Japanese American internment ==
During World War II, the Census Bureau responded to numerous information requests from US government agencies, including the US Army and the US Secret Service, to facilitate the internment of Japanese Americans. In his report of the operation, U.S. Army Lt. Gen. John L. DeWitt wrote that "The most important single source of information prior to the evacuation was the 1940 Census of Population."
