= 1930 United States census =

15th US national census

Fifteenth census of the United States
- April 1, 1930
- U.S. Census Bureau seal

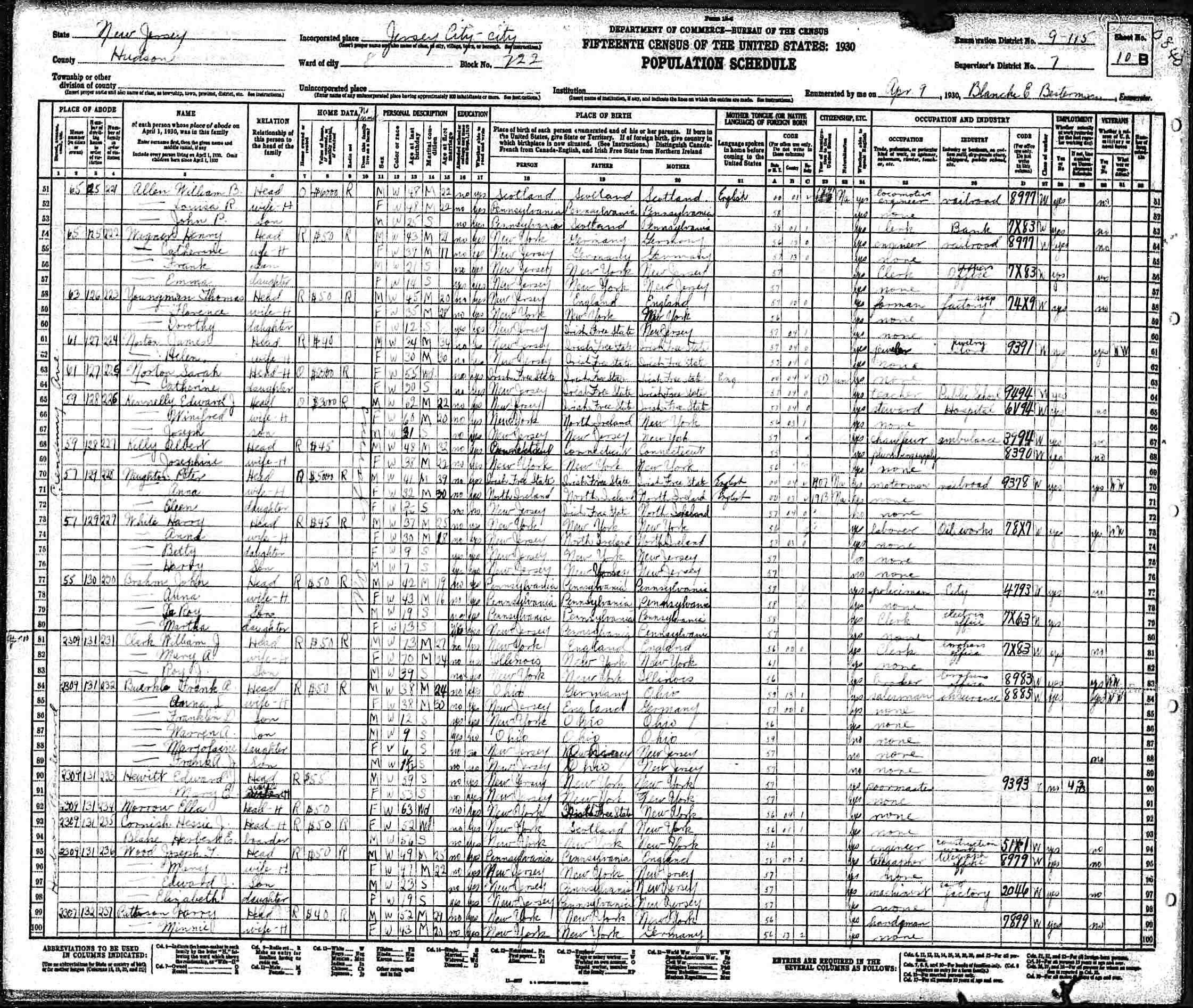
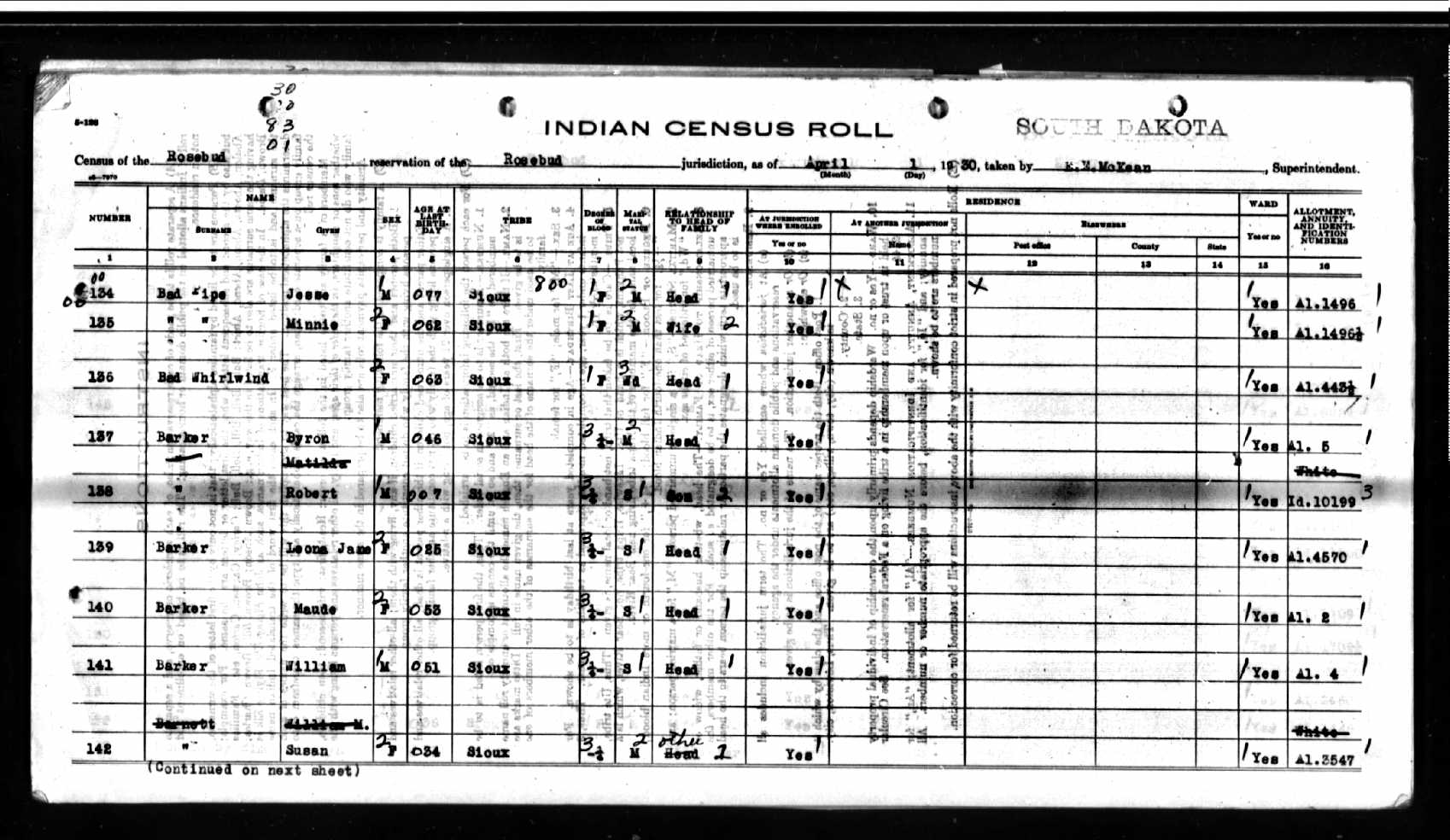
- Population schedule Indian census roll

General information
- Country: United States

Results
- Total population: 122,775,046 (▲13.7%)
- Most populous state: New York; 12,588,066
- Least populous state: Nevada; 91,058

The 1930 United States census, conducted by the Census Bureau one month from April 1, 1930, determined the resident population of the United States to be 122,775,046, an increase of 13.7 percent over the 106,021,537 persons enumerated during the 1920 census.

It was the first time the effects of suburban sprawl were recorded when, during the Roaring Twenties, a significant portion of the working population of New York City moved to New Jersey, aided by the George Washington Bridge which permitted quick transport from the state to Manhattan. It was also the first in which a city in the Western United States (Los Angeles) reached a population of at least a million people.

== Census questions ==
The 1930 census collected the following information:

- address
- name
- relationship to head of family
- home owned or rented
  - if owned, value of home
  - if rented, monthly rent
- whether owned a radio set
- whether on a farm
- sex
- race
- age
- marital status and, if married, age at first marriage
- school attendance
- literacy
- birthplace of person, and their parents
- if foreign born:
  - language spoken at home before coming to the U. S.
  - year of immigration
  - whether naturalized
  - ability to speak English
- occupation, industry and class of worker
- whether at work previous day (or last regular work day)
- veteran status
- if Indian:
  - whether of full or mixed blood
  - tribal affiliation

Full documentation for the 1930 census, including census forms and enumerator instructions, is available from the Integrated Public Use Microdata Series.

== Data availability ==
The original census enumeration sheets were microfilmed by the Census Bureau in 1949, after which the original sheets were destroyed. The microfilmed census is located on 2,667 rolls of microfilm, and available from the National Archives and Records Administration. Several organizations also host images of the microfilmed census online, and digital indices.

Microdata from the 1930 census are freely available through the Integrated Public Use Microdata Series. Aggregate data for small areas, together with electronic boundary files, can be downloaded from the National Historical Geographic Information System.

== State rankings ==
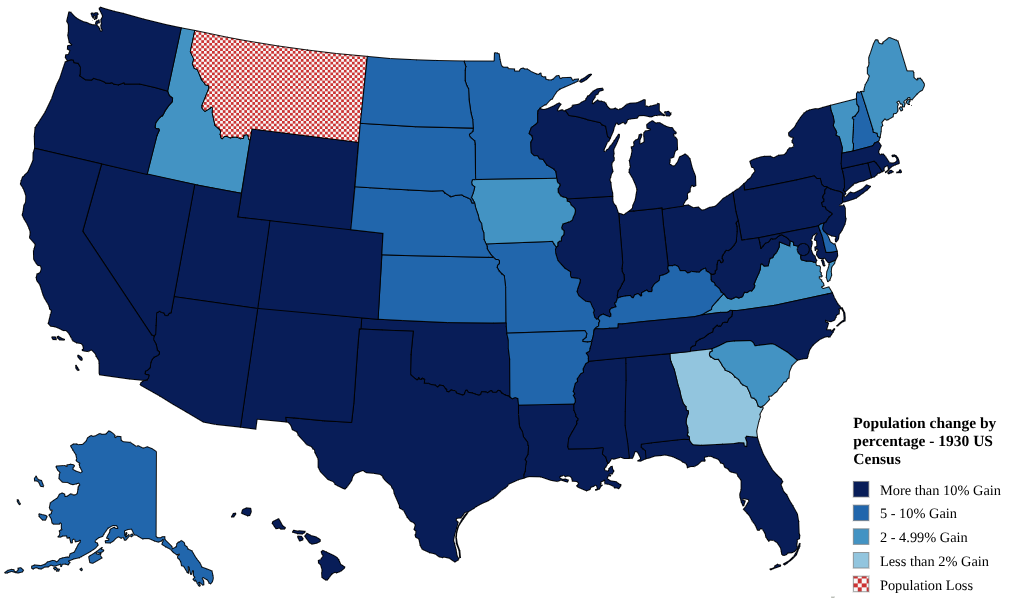
A map showing the population change of each US State by percentage.

Rank	State	Population as of 1930 census	Population as of 1920 census	Change	Percent change
1	New York	12,588,066	10,385,227	2,202,839 ▲	21.2% ▲
2	Pennsylvania	9,631,350	8,720,017	911,333 ▲	10.5% ▲
3	Illinois	7,630,654	6,485,280	1,145,374 ▲	17.7% ▲
4	Ohio	6,646,697	5,759,394	887,303 ▲	15.4% ▲
5	Texas	5,824,715	4,663,228	1,161,487 ▲	24.9% ▲
6	California	5,677,251	3,426,861	2,250,390 ▲	65.7% ▲
7	Michigan	4,842,325	3,668,412	1,173,913 ▲	32.0% ▲
8	Massachusetts	4,249,614	3,852,356	397,258 ▲	10.3% ▲
9	New Jersey	4,041,334	3,155,900	885,434 ▲	28.1% ▲
10	Missouri	3,629,367	3,404,055	225,312 ▲	6.6% ▲
11	Indiana	3,238,503	2,930,390	308,113 ▲	10.5% ▲
12	North Carolina	3,170,276	2,559,123	611,153 ▲	23.9% ▲
13	Wisconsin	2,939,006	2,632,067	306,939 ▲	11.7% ▲
14	Georgia	2,908,506	2,895,832	12,674 ▲	0.4% ▲
15	Alabama	2,646,248	2,348,174	298,074 ▲	12.7% ▲
16	Tennessee	2,616,556	2,337,885	278,671 ▲	11.9% ▲
17	Kentucky	2,614,589	2,416,630	197,959 ▲	8.2% ▲
18	Minnesota	2,563,953	2,387,125	176,828 ▲	7.4% ▲
19	Iowa	2,470,939	2,404,021	66,918 ▲	2.8% ▲
20	Virginia	2,421,851	2,309,187	112,664 ▲	4.9% ▲
21	Oklahoma	2,396,040	2,028,283	367,757 ▲	18.1% ▲
22	Louisiana	2,101,593	1,798,509	303,084 ▲	16.9% ▲
23	Mississippi	2,009,821	1,790,618	219,203 ▲	12.2% ▲
24	Kansas	1,880,999	1,769,257	111,742 ▲	6.3% ▲
25	Arkansas	1,854,482	1,752,204	102,278 ▲	5.8% ▲
26	South Carolina	1,738,765	1,683,724	55,041 ▲	3.3% ▲
27	West Virginia	1,729,205	1,463,701	265,504 ▲	18.1% ▲
28	Maryland	1,631,526	1,449,661	181,865 ▲	12.5% ▲
29	Connecticut	1,606,903	1,380,631	226,272 ▲	16.4% ▲
30	Washington	1,563,396	1,356,621	206,775 ▲	15.2% ▲
31	Florida	1,468,211	968,470	499,741 ▲	51.6% ▲
32	Nebraska	1,377,963	1,296,372	81,591 ▲	6.3% ▲
33	Colorado	1,035,791	939,629	96,162 ▲	10.2% ▲
34	Oregon	953,786	783,389	170,397 ▲	21.8% ▲
35	Maine	797,423	768,014	29,409 ▲	3.8% ▲
36	South Dakota	692,849	636,547	56,302 ▲	8.8% ▲
37	Rhode Island	687,497	604,397	83,100 ▲	13.7% ▲
38	North Dakota	680,845	646,872	33,973 ▲	5.3% ▲
39	Montana	537,606	548,889	-11,283 ▼	-2.1% ▼
40	Utah	507,847	449,396	58,451 ▲	13.0% ▲
–	District of Columbia	486,869	437,571	49,298 ▲	11.3% ▲
41	New Hampshire	465,293	443,083	22,210 ▲	5.0% ▲
42	Idaho	445,032	431,866	13,166 ▲	3.0% ▲
43	Arizona	435,573	334,162	101,411 ▲	30.3% ▲
44	New Mexico	423,317	360,350	62,967 ▲	17.5% ▲
–	Hawaii	368,300	255,881	112,419 ▲	43.9% ▲
45	Vermont	359,611	352,428	7,183 ▲	2.0% ▲
46	Delaware	238,380	223,003	15,377 ▲	6.9% ▲
47	Wyoming	225,565	194,402	31,163 ▲	16.0% ▲
48	Nevada	91,058	77,407	13,651 ▲	17.6% ▲
–	Alaska	59,278	55,036	4,242 ▲	7.7% ▲

== City rankings ==
Rank	City	State	Population	Region (2016)
01	New York	New York	6,930,446	Northeast
02	Chicago	Illinois	3,376,438	Midwest
03	Philadelphia	Pennsylvania	1,950,961	Northeast
04	Detroit	Michigan	1,568,662	Midwest
05	Los Angeles	California	1,238,048	West
06	Cleveland	Ohio	900,429	Midwest
07	St. Louis	Missouri	821,960	Midwest
08	Baltimore	Maryland	804,874	South
09	Boston	Massachusetts	781,188	Northeast
10	Pittsburgh	Pennsylvania	669,817	Northeast
11	San Francisco	California	634,394	West
12	Milwaukee	Wisconsin	578,249	Midwest
13	Buffalo	New York	573,076	Northeast
14	Washington	District of Columbia	486,869	South
15	Minneapolis	Minnesota	464,356	Midwest
16	New Orleans	Louisiana	458,762	South
17	Cincinnati	Ohio	451,160	Midwest
18	Newark	New Jersey	442,337	Northeast
19	Kansas City	Missouri	399,746	Midwest
20	Seattle	Washington	365,583	West
21	Indianapolis	Indiana	364,161	Midwest
22	Rochester	New York	328,132	Northeast
23	Jersey City	New Jersey	316,715	Northeast
24	Louisville	Kentucky	307,745	South
25	Portland	Oregon	301,815	West
26	Houston	Texas	292,352	South
27	Toledo	Ohio	290,718	Midwest
28	Columbus	Ohio	290,564	Midwest
29	Denver	Colorado	287,861	West
30	Oakland	California	284,063	West
31	Saint Paul	Minnesota	271,606	Midwest
32	Atlanta	Georgia	270,366	South
33	Dallas	Texas	260,475	South
34	Birmingham	Alabama	259,678	South
35	Akron	Ohio	255,040	Midwest
36	Memphis	Tennessee	253,143	South
37	Providence	Rhode Island	252,981	Northeast
38	San Antonio	Texas	231,542	South
39	Omaha	Nebraska	214,006	Midwest
40	Syracuse	New York	209,326	Northeast
41	Dayton	Ohio	200,982	Midwest
42	Worcester	Massachusetts	195,311	Northeast
43	Oklahoma City	Oklahoma	185,389	South
44	Richmond	Virginia	182,929	South
45	Youngstown	Ohio	170,002	Midwest
46	Grand Rapids	Michigan	168,592	Midwest
47	Hartford	Connecticut	164,072	Northeast
48	Fort Worth	Texas	163,447	South
49	New Haven	Connecticut	162,655	Northeast
50	Flint	Michigan	156,492	Midwest
51	Nashville	Tennessee	153,866	South
52	Springfield	Massachusetts	149,900	Northeast
53	San Diego	California	147,995	West
54	Bridgeport	Connecticut	146,716	Northeast
55	Scranton	Pennsylvania	143,433	Northeast
56	Des Moines	Iowa	142,559	Midwest
57	Long Beach	California	142,032	West
58	Tulsa	Oklahoma	141,258	South
59	Salt Lake City	Utah	140,267	West
60	Paterson	New Jersey	138,513	Northeast
61	Yonkers	New York	134,646	Northeast
62	Norfolk	Virginia	129,710	South
63	Jacksonville	Florida	129,549	South
64	Albany	New York	127,412	Northeast
65	Trenton	New Jersey	123,356	Northeast
66	Kansas City	Kansas	121,857	Midwest
67	Chattanooga	Tennessee	119,798	South
68	Camden	New Jersey	118,700	Northeast
69	Erie	Pennsylvania	115,967	Northeast
70	Spokane	Washington	115,514	West
71	Fall River	Massachusetts	115,274	Northeast
72	Fort Wayne	Indiana	114,946	Midwest
73	Elizabeth	New Jersey	114,589	Northeast
74	Cambridge	Massachusetts	113,643	Northeast
75	New Bedford	Massachusetts	112,597	Northeast
76	Reading	Pennsylvania	111,171	Northeast
77	Wichita	Kansas	111,110	Midwest
78	Miami	Florida	110,637	South
79	Tacoma	Washington	106,817	West
80	Wilmington	Delaware	106,597	South
81	Knoxville	Tennessee	105,802	South
82	Peoria	Illinois	104,969	Midwest
83	Canton	Ohio	104,906	Midwest
84	South Bend	Indiana	104,193	Midwest
85	Somerville	Massachusetts	103,908	Northeast
86	El Paso	Texas	102,421	South
87	Lynn	Massachusetts	102,320	Northeast
88	Evansville	Indiana	102,249	Midwest
89	Utica	New York	101,740	Northeast
90	Duluth	Minnesota	101,463	Midwest
91	Tampa	Florida	101,161	South
92	Gary	Indiana	100,426	Midwest
93	Lowell	Massachusetts	100,234	Northeast
94	Waterbury	Connecticut	99,902	Northeast
95	Schenectady	New York	95,692	Northeast
96	Sacramento	California	93,750	West
97	Allentown	Pennsylvania	92,563	Northeast
98	Bayonne	New Jersey	88,979	Northeast
99	Wilkes-Barre	Pennsylvania	86,626	Northeast
100	Rockford	Illinois	85,864	Midwest

== Locations of 50 most populous cities ==
Location of 50 largest cities by population in the United States in 1930. Not shown: Manila, Philippines.
