= 1980 United States census =

20th United States national census

Twentieth census of the United States
- April 1, 1980
- U.S. Census Bureau seal

- 1980 U.S. census logo

General information
- Country: United States

Results
- Total population: 226,545,805 (▲11.4%)
- Most populous state: California; 23,667,902
- Least populous state: Alaska; 401,851

The 1980 United States census, conducted by the Census Bureau, determined the resident population of the United States to be 226,545,805, an increase of 11.4% over the 203,184,772 persons enumerated during the 1970 census. It was the first census in which a state—California—recorded a population of 20 million people, as well as the first in which all states recorded populations of over 400,000. This was the first census to count Hispanic and Latino Americans as an ethnicity.

== Census questions ==
The 1980 census collected the following information from all respondents:

- Address
- Name
- Household relationship
- Gender
- Race
- Age
- Marital status
- Whether of Spanish/Hispanic origin or descent

It was the first census not to ask for the name of the "head of household."

Approximately 16 percent of households received a "long form" of the 1980 census, which contained over 100 questions. Full documentation on the 1980 census, including census forms and a procedural history, is available from the Integrated Public Use Microdata Series.

== Data availability ==
Microdata from the 1980 census are freely available through the Integrated Public Use Microdata Series. Aggregate data for small areas, together with electronic boundary files, can be downloaded from the National Historical Geographic Information System. Personally identifiable information will be available in 2052.

== State population rankings ==
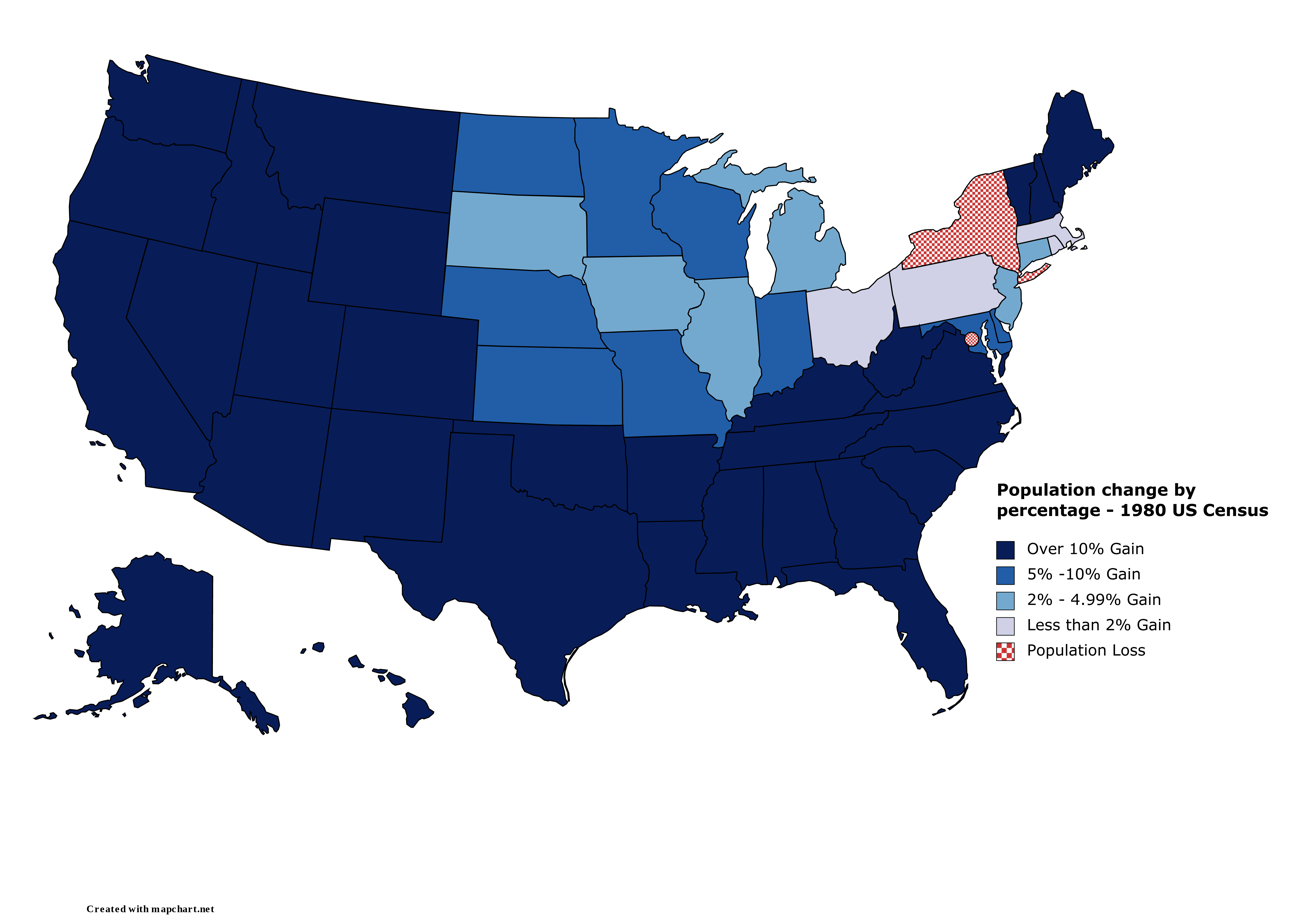
A map showing the population change of each U.S. state by percentage.

Rank	State	Population as of 1980 census	Population as of 1970 census	Change	Percent change
1	California	23,667,902	19,953,134	3,714,768 ▲	18.6% ▲
2	New York	17,558,072	18,236,967	–678,895 ▼	–3.7% ▼
3	Texas	14,229,191	11,196,730	3,032,461 ▲	27.1% ▲
4	Pennsylvania	11,863,895	11,793,909	69,986 ▲	0.6% ▲
5	Illinois	11,426,518	11,113,976	312,542 ▲	2.8% ▲
6	Ohio	10,797,630	10,652,017	145,613 ▲	1.4% ▲
7	Florida	9,746,324	6,789,443	2,956,881 ▲	43.6% ▲
8	Michigan	9,262,078	8,875,083	386,995 ▲	4.4% ▲
9	New Jersey	7,364,823	7,168,164	196,659 ▲	2.7% ▲
10	North Carolina	5,881,766	5,082,059	799,707 ▲	15.7% ▲
11	Massachusetts	5,737,037	5,689,170	47,867 ▲	0.8% ▲
12	Indiana	5,490,224	5,193,669	296,555 ▲	5.7% ▲
13	Georgia	5,463,105	4,589,575	873,530 ▲	19.0% ▲
14	Virginia	5,346,818	4,668,494	678,324 ▲	15.0% ▲
15	Missouri	4,916,686	4,676,501	240,185 ▲	5.1% ▲
16	Wisconsin	4,705,767	4,417,731	288,036 ▲	6.5% ▲
17	Tennessee	4,591,120	3,923,687	667,443 ▲	17.0% ▲
18	Maryland	4,216,975	3,922,399	294,576 ▲	7.5% ▲
19	Louisiana	4,205,900	3,641,306	564,594 ▲	15.5% ▲
20	Washington	4,132,156	3,409,169	722,987 ▲	21.2% ▲
21	Minnesota	4,075,970	3,804,971	270,999 ▲	7.1% ▲
2	Alabama	3,893,888	3,444,165	449,723 ▲	13.1% ▲
23	Kentucky	3,660,777	3,218,706	442,071 ▲	13.7% ▲
24	South Carolina	3,121,820	2,590,516	531,304 ▲	20.5% ▲
25	Connecticut	3,107,576	3,031,709	75,867 ▲	2.5% ▲
26	Oklahoma	3,025,290	2,559,229	466,061 ▲	18.2% ▲
27	Iowa	2,913,808	2,824,376	89,432 ▲	3.2% ▲
28	Colorado	2,889,964	2,207,259	682,705 ▲	30.9% ▲
29	Arizona	2,718,215	1,745,944	972,271 ▲	55.7% ▲
30	Oregon	2,633,105	2,091,533	541,572 ▲	25.9% ▲
31	Mississippi	2,520,638	2,216,192	304,446 ▲	13.7% ▲
32	Kansas	2,363,679	2,246,578	117,101 ▲	5.2% ▲
33	Arkansas	2,286,435	1,923,295	363,140 ▲	18.9% ▲
34	West Virginia	1,949,644	1,744,237	205,407 ▲	11.8% ▲
35	Nebraska	1,569,825	1,483,493	86,332 ▲	5.8% ▲
36	Utah	1,461,037	1,059,273	401,764 ▲	37.9% ▲
37	New Mexico	1,302,894	1,017,055	285,839 ▲	28.1% ▲
38	Maine	1,124,660	992,048	132,612 ▲	13.4% ▲
39	Hawaii	964,691	769,913	194,778 ▲	25.3% ▲
40	Rhode Island	947,154	946,725	429 ▲	0.0% ▲
41	Idaho	943,935	712,567	231,368 ▲	32.5% ▲
42	New Hampshire	920,610	737,681	182,929 ▲	24.8% ▲
43	Nevada	800,493	488,738	311,755 ▲	63.8% ▲
44	Montana	786,690	694,409	92,281 ▲	13.3% ▲
45	South Dakota	690,768	665,507	25,261 ▲	3.8% ▲
46	North Dakota	652,717	617,761	34,956 ▲	5.7% ▲
—	District of Columbia	638,333	756,510	–118,177 ▼	–15.6% ▼
47	Delaware	594,338	548,104	46,234 ▲	8.4% ▲
48	Vermont	511,456	444,330	67,126 ▲	15.1% ▲
49	Wyoming	469,557	332,416	137,141 ▲	41.3% ▲
50	Alaska	401,851	300,382	101,469 ▲	33.8% ▲

Between the 1980 census and the 1990 census, the United States population increased by approximately 22,164,837 or 9.8%.

== City population rankings ==
Rank	City	State	Population	Region (2016)
01	New York	New York	7,071,639	Northeast
02	Chicago	Illinois	3,005,072	Midwest
03	Los Angeles	California	2,966,850	West
04	Philadelphia	Pennsylvania	1,688,210	Northeast
05	Houston	Texas	1,595,138	South
06	Detroit	Michigan	1,203,339	Midwest
07	Dallas	Texas	904,078	South
08	San Diego	California	875,538	West
09	Phoenix	Arizona	789,704	West
10	Baltimore	Maryland	786,775	South
11	San Antonio	Texas	785,880	South
12	Indianapolis	Indiana	700,807	Midwest
13	San Francisco	California	678,974	West
14	Memphis	Tennessee	646,174	South
15	Washington	District of Columbia	638,333	South
16	Milwaukee	Wisconsin	636,212	Midwest
17	San Jose	California	629,442	West
18	Cleveland	Ohio	573,822	Midwest
19	Columbus	Ohio	564,871	Midwest
20	Boston	Massachusetts	562,994	Northeast
21	New Orleans	Louisiana	557,515	South
22	Jacksonville	Florida	540,920	South
23	Seattle	Washington	493,846	West
24	Denver	Colorado	492,365	West
25	Nashville-Davidson	Tennessee	455,651	South
26	St. Louis	Missouri	453,085	Midwest
27	Kansas City	Missouri	448,159	Midwest
28	El Paso	Texas	425,259	South
29	Atlanta	Georgia	425,022	South
30	Pittsburgh	Pennsylvania	423,938	Northeast
31	Oklahoma City	Oklahoma	403,213	South
32	Cincinnati	Ohio	385,457	Midwest
33	Fort Worth	Texas	385,164	South
34	Minneapolis	Minnesota	370,951	Midwest
35	Portland	Oregon	366,383	West
36	Honolulu	Hawaii	365,048	West
37	Long Beach	California	361,334	West
38	Tulsa	Oklahoma	360,919	South
39	Buffalo	New York	357,870	Northeast
40	Toledo	Ohio	354,635	Midwest
41	Miami	Florida	346,865	South
42	Austin	Texas	345,496	South
43	Oakland	California	339,337	West
44	Albuquerque	New Mexico	331,767	West
45	Tucson	Arizona	330,537	West
46	Newark	New Jersey	329,248	Northeast
47	Charlotte	North Carolina	314,447	South
48	Omaha	Nebraska	314,255	Midwest
49	Louisville	Kentucky	298,451	South
50	Birmingham	Alabama	284,413	South
51	Wichita	Kansas	279,272	Midwest
52	Sacramento	California	275,741	West
53	Tampa	Florida	271,523	South
54	Saint Paul	Minnesota	270,230	Midwest
55	Norfolk	Virginia	266,979	South
56	Virginia Beach	Virginia	262,199	South
57	Rochester	New York	241,741	Northeast
58	St. Petersburg	Florida	238,647	South
59	Akron	Ohio	237,177	Midwest
60	Corpus Christi	Texas	231,999	South
61	Jersey City	New Jersey	223,532	Northeast
62	Baton Rouge	Louisiana	219,419	South
63	Anaheim	California	219,311	West
64	Richmond	Virginia	219,214	South
65	Fresno	California	217,491	West
66	Colorado Springs	Colorado	215,150	West
67	Shreveport	Louisiana	205,820	South
68	Lexington-Fayette	Kentucky	204,165	South
69	Santa Ana	California	203,713	West
70	Dayton	Ohio	203,371	Midwest
71	Jackson	Mississippi	202,895	South
72	Mobile	Alabama	200,452	South
73	Yonkers	New York	195,351	Northeast
74	Des Moines	Iowa	191,003	Midwest
75	Grand Rapids	Michigan	181,843	Midwest
76	Montgomery	Alabama	177,857	South
77	Knoxville	Tennessee	175,030	South
78	Anchorage	Alaska	174,431	West
79	Lubbock	Texas	173,979	South
80	Fort Wayne	Indiana	172,196	Midwest
81	Lincoln	Nebraska	171,932	Midwest
82	Spokane	Washington	171,300	West
83	Riverside	California	170,876	West
84	Madison	Wisconsin	170,616	Midwest
85	Huntington Beach	California	170,505	West
86	Syracuse	New York	170,105	Northeast
87	Chattanooga	Tennessee	169,565	South
88	Columbus	Georgia	169,441	South
89	Las Vegas	Nevada	164,674	West
90	Metairie	Louisiana	164,160	South
91	Salt Lake City	Utah	163,033	West
92	Worcester	Massachusetts	161,799	Northeast
93	Warren	Michigan	161,134	Midwest
94	Kansas City	Kansas	161,087	Midwest
95	Arlington	Texas	160,113	South
96	Flint	Michigan	159,611	Midwest
97	Aurora	Colorado	158,588	West
98	Tacoma	Washington	158,501	West
99	Little Rock	Arkansas	158,461	South
100	Providence	Rhode Island	156,804	Northeast

== Locations of 50 most populous cities ==
Location of 50 largest cities by population in the United States in 1980
