= 1950 United States census =

17th United States national census

Seventeenth census of the United States
- April 1, 1950
- U.S. Census Bureau seal

- 1950 U.S. census logo

General information
- Country: United States

Results
- Total population: 151,325,798 (▲14.5%)
- Most populous state: New York; 14,830,192
- Least populous state: Nevada; 160,083

The 1950 United States census, conducted by the Census Bureau, determined the resident population of the United States to be 151,325,798, an increase of 14.5 percent over the 131,669,275 persons enumerated during the 1940 census.

This was the first census in which:

- More than one state recorded a population of over 10 million
- Every state and territory recorded a population of over 100,000
- All 100 largest cities recorded populations of over 100,000

On April 1, 2022, the National Archives and Records Administration released scanned census enumeration sheets to the general public, in accordance with the 72 year rule. It is the most recent census to have full public availability.

== Census questions ==
The 1950 census collected the following information from all respondents:

- address
- whether house is on a farm
- name
- relationship to head of household
- race
- sex
- age
- marital status
- birthplace
- if foreign born, whether naturalized
- employment status
- hours worked in week
- occupation, industry and class of worker

In addition, a sample of individuals were asked additional questions covering income, marital history, fertility, and other topics. Full documentation on the 1950 census, including census forms and a procedural history, is available from the Integrated Public Use Microdata Series.

== Data availability ==
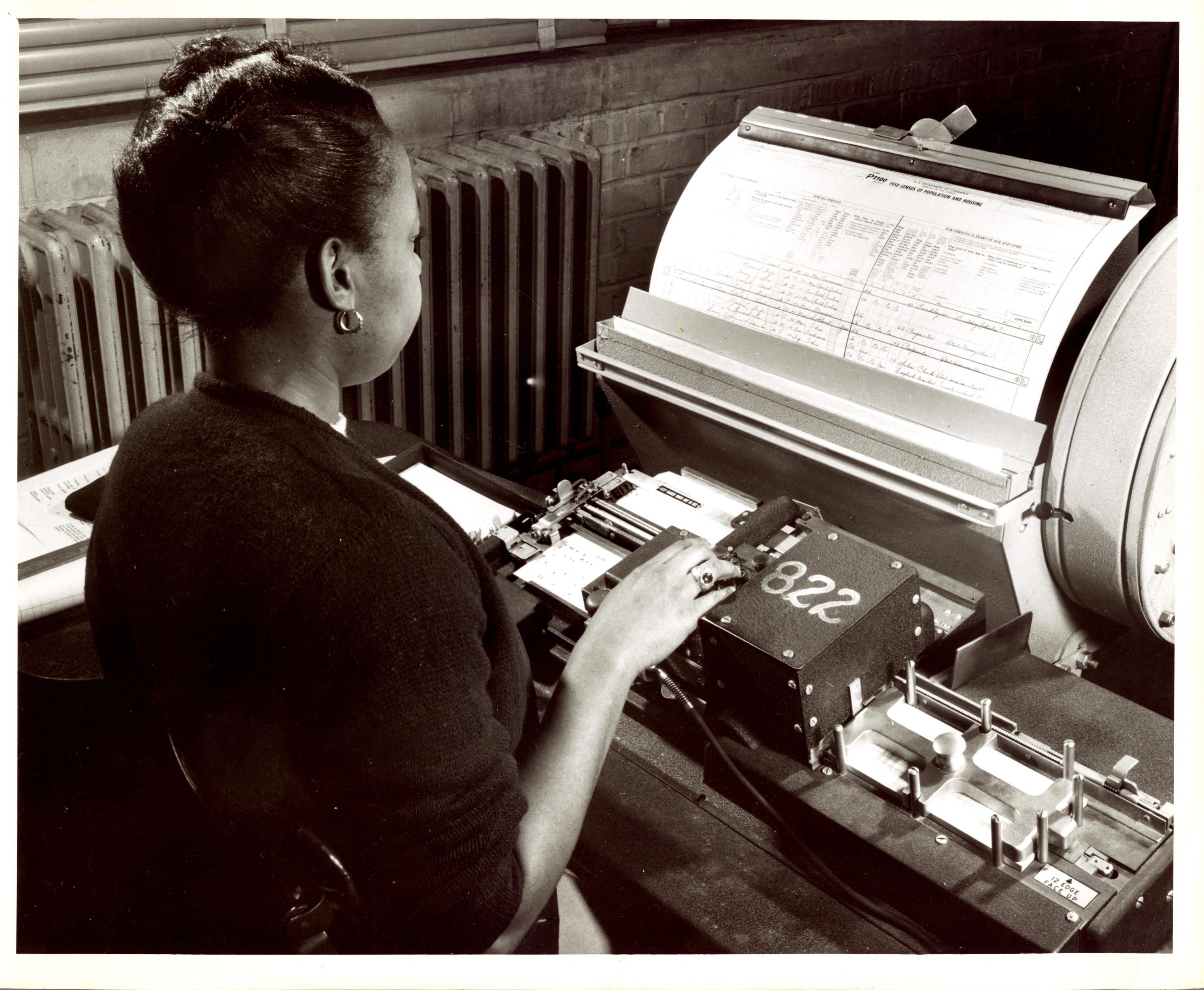
A clerk creating punch cards containing data from the census.

Microdata from the 1950 census are freely available through the Integrated Public Use Microdata Series. Aggregate data for small areas, together with electronic boundary files, can be downloaded from the National Historical Geographic Information System. All identifiable information in the census became available in April 2022 upon the release of the images taken by the National Archives and Records Administration.

On April 1, 2022, 72 years after the census was taken, the National Archives and Records Administration released scanned census enumeration sheets to the general public. The census data was also made freely searchable by name on other websites. Genealogy companies Ancestry and FamilySearch partnered to use AI and human volunteers to review an index of all names listed on the 1950 census forms.

== State rankings ==
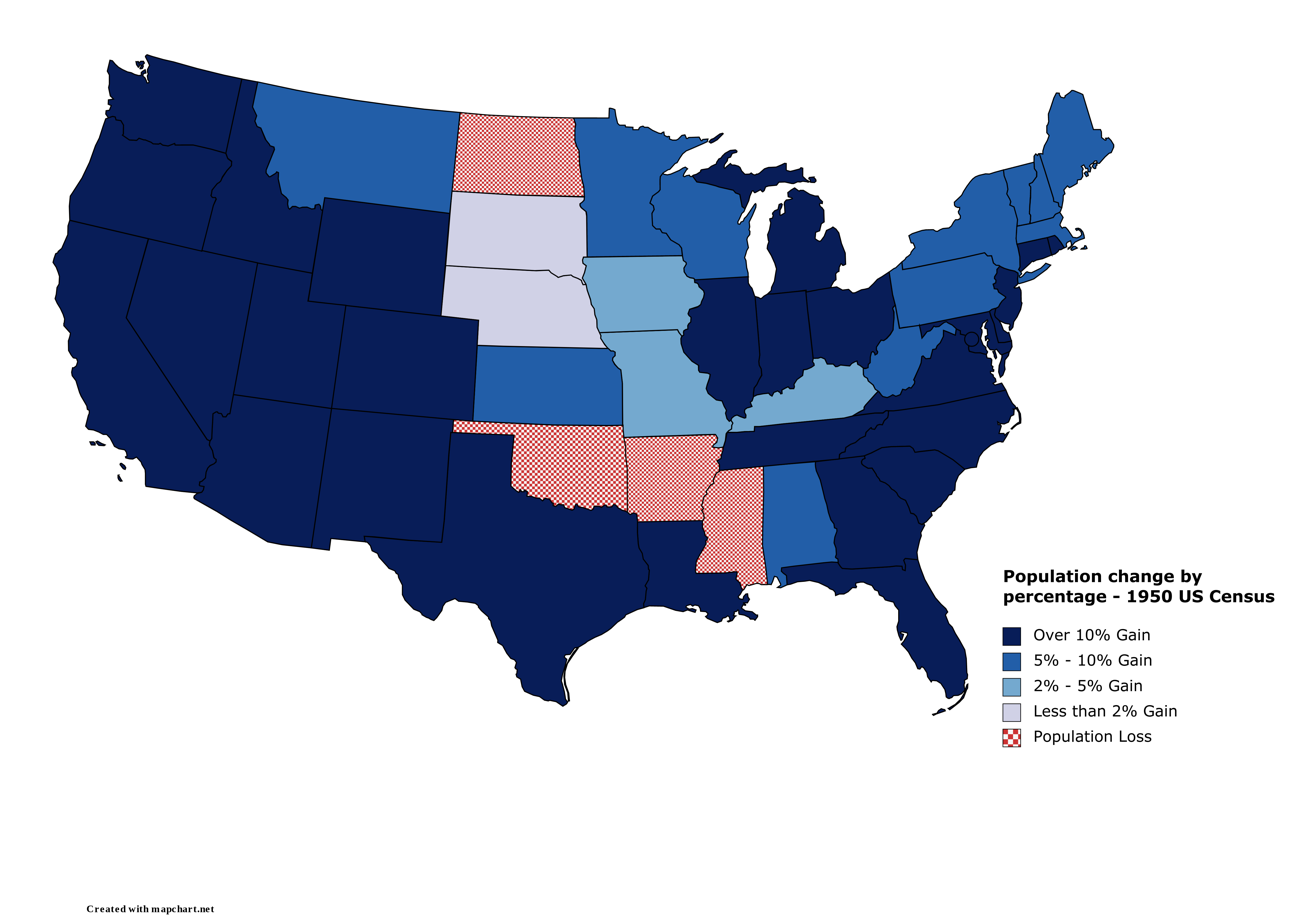
A map showing the population change of each US State by percentage.

Rank	State	Population as of 1950 census	Population as of 1940 census	Change	Percent change
1	New York	14,830,192	13,479,142	1,351,050 ▲	10.0% ▲
2	California	10,586,223	6,907,387	3,678,836 ▲	53.3% ▲
3	Pennsylvania	10,498,012	9,900,180	597,832 ▲	6.0% ▲
4	Illinois	8,712,176	7,897,241	814,935 ▲	10.3% ▲
5	Ohio	7,946,627	6,907,612	1,039,015 ▲	15.0% ▲
6	Texas	7,711,194	6,414,824	1,296,370 ▲	20.2% ▲
7	Michigan	6,371,766	5,256,106	1,115,660 ▲	21.2% ▲
8	New Jersey	4,835,329	4,160,165	675,164 ▲	16.2% ▲
9	Massachusetts	4,690,514	4,316,721	373,793 ▲	8.7% ▲
10	North Carolina	4,061,929	3,571,623	490,306 ▲	13.7% ▲
11	Missouri	3,954,653	3,784,664	169,989 ▲	4.5% ▲
12	Indiana	3,934,224	3,427,796	506,428 ▲	14.8% ▲
13	Georgia	3,444,578	3,123,723	320,855 ▲	10.3% ▲
14	Wisconsin	3,434,575	3,137,587	296,988 ▲	9.5% ▲
15	Virginia	3,318,680	2,677,773	640,907 ▲	23.9% ▲
16	Tennessee	3,291,718	2,915,841	375,877 ▲	12.9% ▲
17	Alabama	3,061,743	2,832,961	228,782 ▲	8.1% ▲
18	Minnesota	2,982,483	2,792,300	190,183 ▲	6.8% ▲
19	Kentucky	2,944,806	2,845,627	99,179 ▲	3.5% ▲
20	Florida	2,771,305	1,897,414	873,891 ▲	46.1% ▲
21	Louisiana	2,683,516	2,363,516	320,000 ▲	13.5% ▲
22	Iowa	2,621,073	2,538,268	82,805 ▲	3.3% ▲
23	Washington	2,378,963	1,736,191	642,772 ▲	37.0% ▲
24	Maryland	2,343,001	1,821,244	521,757 ▲	28.6% ▲
25	Oklahoma	2,233,351	2,336,434	−103,083 ▼	−4.4% ▼
26	Mississippi	2,178,914	2,183,796	−4,882 ▼	−0.2% ▼
27	South Carolina	2,117,027	1,899,804	217,223 ▲	11.4% ▲
28	Connecticut	2,007,280	1,709,242	298,038 ▲	17.4% ▲
29	West Virginia	2,005,552	1,901,974	103,578 ▲	5.4% ▲
30	Arkansas	1,909,511	1,949,387	−39,876 ▼	−2.0% ▼
31	Kansas	1,905,299	1,801,028	104,271 ▲	5.8% ▲
32	Oregon	1,521,341	1,089,684	431,657 ▲	39.6% ▲
33	Nebraska	1,325,510	1,315,834	9,676 ▲	0.7% ▲
34	Colorado	1,325,089	1,123,296	201,793 ▲	18.0% ▲
35	Maine	913,774	847,226	66,548 ▲	7.9% ▲
—	District of Columbia	802,178	663,091	139,087 ▲	21.0% ▲
36	Rhode Island	791,896	713,346	78,550 ▲	11.0% ▲
37	Arizona	749,587	499,261	250,326 ▲	50.1% ▲
38	Utah	688,862	550,310	138,552 ▲	25.2% ▲
39	New Mexico	681,187	531,818	149,369 ▲	28.1% ▲
40	South Dakota	652,740	642,961	9,779 ▲	1.5% ▲
41	North Dakota	619,636	641,935	−22,299 ▼	−3.5% ▼
42	Montana	591,024	559,456	31,568 ▲	5.6% ▲
43	Idaho	588,637	524,873	63,764 ▲	12.1% ▲
44	New Hampshire	533,242	491,524	41,718 ▲	8.5% ▲
—	Hawaii	499,794	422,770	77,024 ▲	18.2% ▲
45	Vermont	377,747	359,231	18,516 ▲	5.2% ▲
46	Delaware	318,085	266,505	51,580 ▲	19.4% ▲
47	Wyoming	290,529	250,742	39,787 ▲	15.9% ▲
48	Nevada	160,083	110,247	49,836 ▲	45.2% ▲
—	Alaska	128,643	72,524	56,119 ▲	77.4% ▲
—	United States	151,325,798	132,164,569	19,161,229 ▲	14.5% ▲

== City rankings ==
Rank	City	State	Population	Region (2016)
01	New York	New York	7,891,957	Northeast
02	Chicago	Illinois	3,620,962	Midwest
03	Philadelphia	Pennsylvania	2,071,605	Northeast
04	Los Angeles	California	1,970,358	West
05	Detroit	Michigan	1,849,568	Midwest
06	Baltimore	Maryland	949,708	South
07	Cleveland	Ohio	914,808	Midwest
08	St. Louis	Missouri	856,796	Midwest
09	Washington	District of Columbia	802,178	South
10	Boston	Massachusetts	801,444	Northeast
11	San Francisco	California	775,357	West
12	Pittsburgh	Pennsylvania	676,806	Northeast
13	Milwaukee	Wisconsin	637,392	Midwest
14	Houston	Texas	596,163	South
15	Buffalo	New York	580,132	Northeast
16	New Orleans	Louisiana	570,445	South
17	Minneapolis	Minnesota	521,718	Midwest
18	Cincinnati	Ohio	503,998	Midwest
19	Seattle	Washington	467,591	West
20	Kansas City	Missouri	456,622	Midwest
21	Newark	New Jersey	438,776	Northeast
22	Dallas	Texas	434,462	South
23	Indianapolis	Indiana	427,173	Midwest
24	Denver	Colorado	415,786	West
25	San Antonio	Texas	408,442	South
26	Memphis	Tennessee	396,000	South
27	Oakland	California	384,575	West
28	Columbus	Ohio	375,901	Midwest
29	Portland	Oregon	373,628	West
30	Louisville	Kentucky	369,129	South
31	San Diego	California	334,387	West
32	Rochester	New York	332,488	Northeast
33	Atlanta	Georgia	331,314	South
34	Birmingham	Alabama	326,037	South
35	Saint Paul	Minnesota	311,349	Midwest
36	Toledo	Ohio	303,616	Midwest
37	Jersey City	New Jersey	299,017	Northeast
38	Fort Worth	Texas	278,778	South
39	Akron	Ohio	274,605	Midwest
40	Omaha	Nebraska	251,117	Midwest
41	Long Beach	California	250,767	West
42	Miami	Florida	249,276	South
43	Providence	Rhode Island	248,674	Northeast
44	Dayton	Ohio	243,872	Midwest
45	Oklahoma City	Oklahoma	243,504	South
46	Richmond	Virginia	230,310	South
47	Syracuse	New York	220,583	Northeast
48	Norfolk	Virginia	213,513	South
49	Jacksonville	Florida	204,517	South
50	Worcester	Massachusetts	203,486	Northeast
51	Tulsa	Oklahoma	182,740	South
52	Salt Lake City	Utah	182,121	West
53	Des Moines	Iowa	177,965	Midwest
54	Hartford	Connecticut	177,397	Northeast
55	Grand Rapids	Michigan	176,515	Midwest
56	Nashville	Tennessee	174,307	South
57	Youngstown	Ohio	168,330	Midwest
58	Wichita	Kansas	168,279	Midwest
59	New Haven	Connecticut	164,443	Northeast
60	Flint	Michigan	163,143	Midwest
61	Springfield	Massachusetts	162,399	Northeast
62	Spokane	Washington	161,721	West
63	Bridgeport	Connecticut	158,709	Northeast
64	Yonkers	New York	152,798	Northeast
65	Tacoma	Washington	143,673	West
66	Paterson	New Jersey	139,336	Northeast
67	Sacramento	California	137,572	West
68	Arlington	Virginia	135,449	South
69	Albany	New York	134,995	Northeast
70	Charlotte	North Carolina	134,042	South
71	Gary	Indiana	133,911	Midwest
72	Fort Wayne	Indiana	133,607	Midwest
73	Austin	Texas	132,459	South
74	Chattanooga	Tennessee	131,041	South
75	Erie	Pennsylvania	130,803	Northeast
76	El Paso	Texas	130,485	South
77	Kansas City	Kansas	129,553	Midwest
78	Mobile	Alabama	129,009	South
79	Evansville	Indiana	128,636	Midwest
80	Trenton	New Jersey	128,009	Northeast
81	Shreveport	Louisiana	127,206	South
82	Baton Rouge	Louisiana	125,629	South
83	Scranton	Pennsylvania	125,536	Northeast
84	Knoxville	Tennessee	124,769	South
85	Tampa	Florida	124,681	South
86	Camden	New Jersey	124,555	Northeast
87	Cambridge	Massachusetts	120,740	Northeast
88	Savannah	Georgia	119,638	South
89	Canton	Ohio	116,912	Midwest
90	South Bend	Indiana	115,911	Midwest
91	Berkeley	California	113,805	West
92	Elizabeth	New Jersey	112,817	Northeast
93	Fall River	Massachusetts	111,963	Northeast
94	Peoria	Illinois	111,856	Midwest
95	Wilmington	Delaware	110,356	South
96	Reading	Pennsylvania	109,320	Northeast
97	New Bedford	Massachusetts	109,189	Northeast
98	Corpus Christi	Texas	108,287	South
99	Phoenix	Arizona	106,818	West
100	Allentown	Pennsylvania	106,756	Northeast

== Locations of 50 most populous cities ==
Location of 50 largest cities by population in the United States in 1950
