= 1920 United States census =

14th US national census

Fourteenth census of the United States
- January 1, 1920
- U.S. Census Bureau seal

General information
- Country: United States

Results
- Total population: 106,021,537 (▲15.0%)
- Most populous state: New York; 10,385,227
- Least populous state: Nevada; 77,407

The 1920 United States census, conducted by the Census Bureau during one month from January 5, 1920, determined the resident population of the United States to be 106,021,537, an increase of 15.0 percent over the 92,228,496 persons enumerated during the 1910 census.

The 1920 Census was determined for 1 January 1920. The actual date of the enumeration appears on the heading of each page of the census schedule, but all responses were to reflect the individual's status as of 1 January, even if the status had changed between 1 January and the day of enumeration.

Despite the constitutional requirement that House seats be reapportioned to the states respective of their population every ten years according to the census, members of Congress failed to agree on a reapportionment plan following this census, and the distribution of seats from the 1910 census remained in effect until 1933. In 1929, Congress passed the Reapportionment Act of 1929 which provided for a permanent method of reapportionment and fixed the number of representatives at 435.

This was the first census in which the United States recorded a population of more than 100 million. It was also the first census in which a state—New York—recorded a population of more than ten million.

This census also marked a significant population shift from rural to urban. According to the Census Bureau, "Beginning in 1910, the minimum population threshold to be categorized as an urban place was set at 2,500. 'Urban' was defined as including all territory, persons, and housing units within an incorporated area that met the population threshold. The 1920 census marked the first time in which over 50 percent of the U.S. population was defined as 'urban.'"

== Census questions ==
The 1920 census collected the following information:

- Age
- Marital status
- If foreign born, year of immigration to the U.S., whether naturalized and, if so, year of naturalization
- School attendance
- Literacy
- State of residence
- If foreign-born, the mother tongue
- Ability to speak English
- Occupation, industry, and class of worker
- Whether home owned or rented, and, if owned, whether free or mortgaged

Full documentation for the 1920 census, including census forms and enumerator instructions, is available from the Integrated Public Use Microdata Series.

== State rankings ==
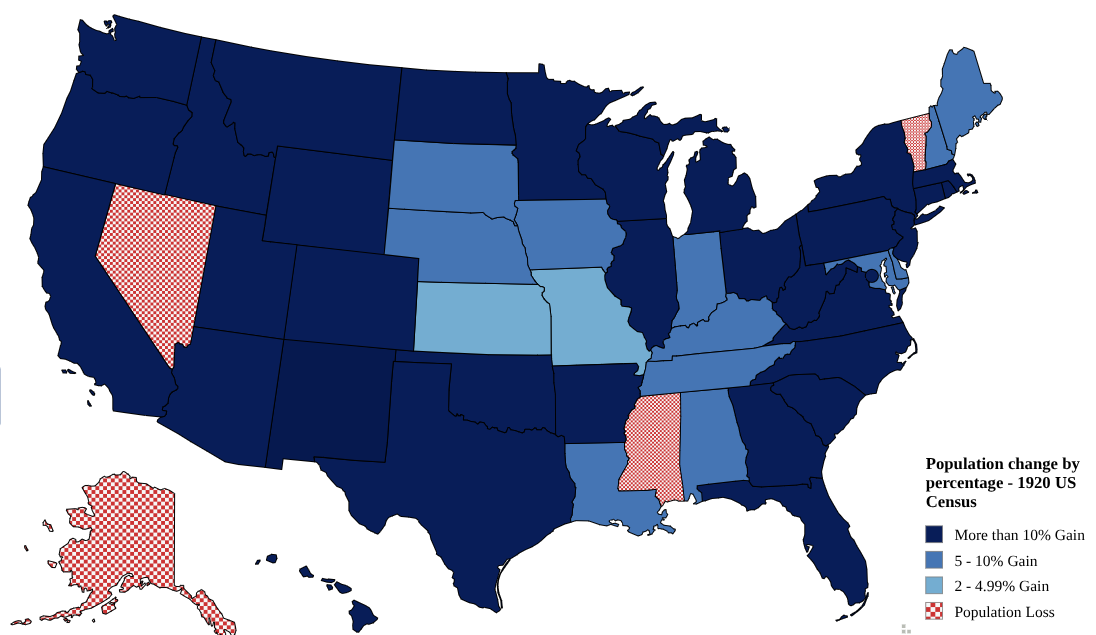
A map showing the population change of each US State by percentage.

Rank	State	Population as of 1920 census	Population as of 1910 census	Change	Percent change
1	New York	10,385,227	9,113,614	1,271,613 ▲	14.0% ▲
2	Pennsylvania	8,720,017	7,665,111	1,054,906 ▲	13.8% ▲
3	Illinois	6,485,280	5,638,591	846,689 ▲	15.0% ▲
4	Ohio	5,759,394	4,767,121	992,273 ▲	20.8% ▲
5	Texas	4,663,228	3,896,542	766,686 ▲	19.7% ▲
6	Massachusetts	3,852,356	3,366,416	485,940 ▲	14.4% ▲
7	Michigan	3,668,412	2,810,173	858,239 ▲	30.5% ▲
8	California	3,426,865	2,377,549	1,049,312 ▲	44.1% ▲
9	Missouri	3,404,055	3,293,335	110,720 ▲	3.4% ▲
10	New Jersey	3,155,900	2,537,167	618,733 ▲	24.4% ▲
11	Indiana	2,930,390	2,700,876	229,514 ▲	8.5% ▲
12	Georgia	2,895,832	2,609,121	286,711 ▲	11.0% ▲
13	Wisconsin	2,632,067	2,333,860	298,207 ▲	12.8% ▲
14	North Carolina	2,559,123	2,206,287	352,836 ▲	16.0% ▲
15	Kentucky	2,416,630	2,289,905	126,725 ▲	5.5% ▲
16	Iowa	2,404,021	2,224,771	179,250 ▲	8.1% ▲
17	Minnesota	2,387,125	2,075,708	311,417 ▲	15.0% ▲
18	Alabama	2,348,174	2,138,093	210,081 ▲	9.8% ▲
19	Tennessee	2,337,885	2,184,789	153,096 ▲	7.0% ▲
20	Virginia	2,309,187	2,061,612	247,575 ▲	12.0% ▲
21	Oklahoma	2,028,283	1,657,155	371,128 ▲	22.4% ▲
22	Louisiana	1,798,509	1,656,388	142,121 ▲	8.6% ▲
23	Mississippi	1,790,618	1,797,114	-6,496 ▼	-0.4% ▼
24	Kansas	1,769,257	1,690,949	78,308 ▲	4.6% ▲
25	Arkansas	1,752,204	1,574,449	177,755 ▲	11.3% ▲
26	South Carolina	1,683,724	1,515,400	168,324 ▲	11.1% ▲
27	West Virginia	1,463,701	1,221,119	242,582 ▲	19.9% ▲
28	Maryland	1,449,661	1,295,346	154,315 ▲	11.9% ▲
29	Connecticut	1,380,631	1,114,756	265,875 ▲	23.9% ▲
30	Washington	1,356,621	1,141,990	214,631 ▲	18.8% ▲
31	Nebraska	1,296,372	1,192,214	104,158 ▲	8.7% ▲
32	Florida	968,470	752,619	215,851 ▲	28.7% ▲
33	Colorado	939,629	799,024	140,605 ▲	17.6% ▲
34	Oregon	783,389	672,765	110,624 ▲	16.4% ▲
35	Maine	768,014	742,371	25,643 ▲	3.5% ▲
36	North Dakota	646,872	577,056	69,816 ▲	12.1% ▲
37	South Dakota	636,547	583,888	52,659 ▲	9.0% ▲
38	Rhode Island	604,397	542,610	61,787 ▲	11.4% ▲
39	Montana	548,889	376,053	172,836 ▲	46.0% ▲
40	Utah	449,396	373,351	76,045 ▲	20.4% ▲
41	New Hampshire	443,083	430,572	12,511 ▲	2.9% ▲
-	District of Columbia	437,571	331,069	106,502 ▲	32.2% ▲
42	Idaho	431,866	325,594	106,272 ▲	32.6% ▲
43	New Mexico	360,350	327,301	33,049 ▲	10.1% ▲
44	Vermont	352,428	355,956	-3,528 ▼	-1.0% ▼
45	Arizona	334,162	204,354	129,808 ▲	63.5% ▲
-	Hawaii	255,881	191,874	64,007 ▲	33.4% ▲
46	Delaware	223,003	202,322	20,681 ▲	10.2% ▲
47	Wyoming	194,402	145,965	48,437 ▲	33.2% ▲
48	Nevada	77,407	81,875	-4,468 ▼	-5.5% ▼
-	Alaska	55,036	64,356	-9,320 ▼	-14.5% ▼

== Territories ==
United States Territories
Year of conquest or purchase	Territory	Population
1867	Alaska	64,356
1898	Hawaii	255,881
1898	Puerto Rico	1,299,809
1898	Guam	13,275
1898	Philippine Islands	10,314,310
1899	American Samoa	—N/a
1903	Panama Canal Zone	—N/a
1915	Haiti	—N/a
1916	Santo Domingo	894,652
1916	US Virgin Islands	—N/a

== City rankings ==
Rank	City	State	Population	Region (2016)
01	New York	New York	5,620,048	Northeast
02	Chicago	Illinois	2,701,705	Midwest
03	Philadelphia	Pennsylvania	1,823,779	Northeast
04	Detroit	Michigan	993,078	Midwest
05	Cleveland	Ohio	796,841	Midwest
06	St. Louis	Missouri	772,897	Midwest
07	Boston	Massachusetts	748,060	Northeast
08	Baltimore	Maryland	733,826	South
09	Pittsburgh	Pennsylvania	588,343	Northeast
10	Los Angeles	California	576,673	West
11	Buffalo	New York	506,775	Northeast
12	San Francisco	California	506,676	West
13	Milwaukee	Wisconsin	457,147	Midwest
14	Washington	District of Columbia	437,571	South
15	Newark	New Jersey	414,524	Northeast
16	Cincinnati	Ohio	401,247	Midwest
17	New Orleans	Louisiana	387,219	South
18	Minneapolis	Minnesota	380,582	Midwest
19	Kansas City	Missouri	324,410	Midwest
20	Seattle	Washington	315,312	West
21	Indianapolis	Indiana	314,194	Midwest
22	Jersey City	New Jersey	298,103	Northeast
23	Rochester	New York	295,750	Northeast
24	Portland	Oregon	258,288	West
25	Denver	Colorado	256,491	West
26	Toledo	Ohio	243,164	Midwest
27	Providence	Rhode Island	237,595	Northeast
28	Columbus	Ohio	237,031	Midwest
29	Louisville	Kentucky	234,891	South
30	Saint Paul	Minnesota	234,698	Midwest
31	Oakland	California	216,261	West
32	Akron	Ohio	208,435	Midwest
33	Atlanta	Georgia	200,616	South
34	Omaha	Nebraska	191,601	Midwest
35	Worcester	Massachusetts	179,754	Northeast
36	Birmingham	Alabama	178,806	South
37	Syracuse	New York	171,717	Northeast
38	Richmond	Virginia	171,667	South
39	New Haven	Connecticut	162,537	Northeast
40	Memphis	Tennessee	162,351	South
41	San Antonio	Texas	161,379	South
42	Dallas	Texas	158,976	South
43	Dayton	Ohio	152,559	Midwest
44	Bridgeport	Connecticut	143,555	Northeast
45	Houston	Texas	138,276	South
46	Hartford	Connecticut	138,036	Northeast
47	Scranton	Pennsylvania	137,783	Northeast
48	Grand Rapids	Michigan	137,634	Midwest
49	Paterson	New Jersey	135,875	Northeast
50	Youngstown	Ohio	132,358	Midwest
51	Springfield	Massachusetts	129,614	Northeast
52	Des Moines	Iowa	126,468	Midwest
53	New Bedford	Massachusetts	121,217	Northeast
54	Fall River	Massachusetts	120,485	Northeast
55	Trenton	New Jersey	119,289	Northeast
56	Nashville	Tennessee	118,342	South
57	Salt Lake City	Utah	118,110	West
58	Camden	New Jersey	116,309	Northeast
59	Norfolk	Virginia	115,777	South
60	Albany	New York	113,344	Northeast
61	Lowell	Massachusetts	112,759	Northeast
62	Wilmington	Delaware	110,168	South
63	Cambridge	Massachusetts	109,694	Northeast
64	Reading	Pennsylvania	107,784	Northeast
65	Fort Worth	Texas	106,482	South
66	Spokane	Washington	104,437	West
67	Kansas City	Kansas	101,177	Midwest
68	Yonkers	New York	100,176	Northeast
69	Lynn	Massachusetts	99,148	Northeast
70	Duluth	Minnesota	98,917	Midwest
71	Tacoma	Washington	96,965	West
72	Elizabeth	New Jersey	95,783	Northeast
73	Lawrence	Massachusetts	94,270	Northeast
74	Utica	New York	94,156	Northeast
75	Erie	Pennsylvania	93,372	Northeast
76	Somerville	Massachusetts	93,091	Northeast
77	Waterbury	Connecticut	91,715	Northeast
78	Flint	Michigan	91,599	Midwest
79	Jacksonville	Florida	91,558	South
80	Oklahoma City	Oklahoma	91,295	South
81	Schenectady	New York	88,723	Northeast
82	Canton	Ohio	87,091	Midwest
83	Fort Wayne	Indiana	86,549	Midwest
84	Evansville	Indiana	85,264	Midwest
85	Savannah	Georgia	83,252	South
86	Manchester	New Hampshire	78,384	Northeast
87	St. Joseph	Missouri	77,939	Midwest
88	Knoxville	Tennessee	77,818	South
89	El Paso	Texas	77,560	South
90	Bayonne	New Jersey	76,754	Northeast
91	Peoria	Illinois	76,121	Midwest
92	Harrisburg	Pennsylvania	75,917	Northeast
93	San Diego	California	74,683	West
94	Wilkes-Barre	Pennsylvania	73,833	Northeast
95	Allentown	Pennsylvania	73,502	Northeast
96	Wichita	Kansas	72,217	Midwest
97	Tulsa	Oklahoma	72,075	South
98	Troy	New York	71,996	Northeast
99	Sioux City	Iowa	71,227	Midwest
100	South Bend	Indiana	70,983	Midwest

== Locations of 50 most populous cities ==
Location of 50 largest cities by population in the United States in 1920. Not shown: Manila, Philippines.
Numbered Cities
1. Bridgeport, Connecticut
2. Paterson, New Jersey

== Data availability ==
The original census enumeration sheets were microfilmed by the Census Bureau in the 1940s, after which the original sheets were destroyed. The microfilmed census is available in rolls from the National Archives and Records Administration. Several organizations also host images of the microfilmed census online, and digital indices.

Microdata from the 1920 census are freely available through the Integrated Public Use Microdata Series. Aggregate data for small areas, together with electronic boundary files, can be downloaded from the National Historical Geographic Information System.
