= 2000 United States census =

22nd United States national census

Twenty-second census of the United States
- April 1, 2000
- U.S. Census Bureau seal

- 2000 U.S. census logo

General information
- Country: United States

Results
- Total population: 281,421,906 (▲13.2%)
- Most populous state: California (33,871,648)
- Least populous state: Wyoming (493,782)

The 2000 United States census, conducted by the Census Bureau, determined the resident population of the United States on April 1, 2000, to be 281,421,906, an increase of 13.2 percent over the 248,709,873 people enumerated during the 1990 census. This was the twenty-second federal census and was at the time the largest civilly administered peacetime effort in the United States.

Approximately 16 percent of households received a "long form" of the 2000 census, which contained over 100 questions. It would be the last census to include the "long form", since subsequent censuses, starting with the 2010 census, would be "short form" only, with the more detailed questions being replaced by the new American Community Survey. Full documentation on the 2000 census, including census forms and a procedural history, is available from the Integrated Public Use Microdata Series.

This was the first census in which a state—California—recorded a population of over 30 million, as well as the first in which two states—California and Texas—recorded populations of more than 20 million.

== Data availability ==
Microdata from the 2000 census is freely available through the Integrated Public Use Microdata Series. Aggregate data for small areas, together with electronic boundary files, can be downloaded from the National Historical Geographic Information System. Personally identifiable information will be available in 2072.

== State rankings ==
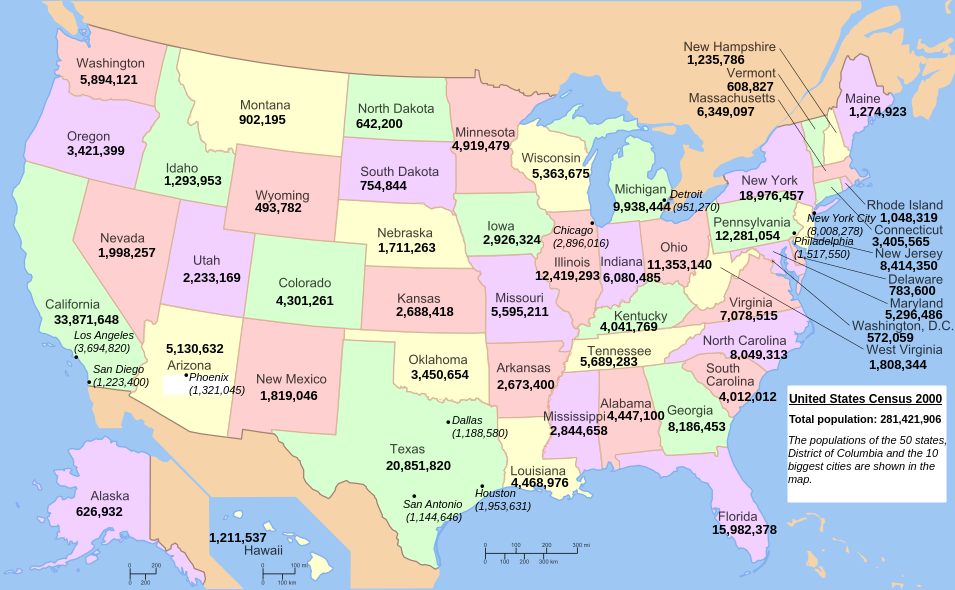
Map of United States population in 2000 US Census, showing the population of the 50 states, the District of Columbia and the 10 biggest cities.

Rank	State	Population as of 2000 census	Population as of 1990 census	Change	Percent change
1	California	33,871,648	29,760,021	▲4,111,627	▲13.8%
2	Texas	20,851,820	16,986,510	▲3,865,510	▲22.8%
3	New York	18,976,457	17,990,455	▲986,002	▲5.5%
4	Florida	15,982,378	12,937,926	▲3,044,452	▲23.5%
5	Illinois	12,419,293	11,430,602	▲988,691	▲8.6%
6	Pennsylvania	12,281,054	11,881,643	▲399,411	▲3.4%
7	Ohio	11,353,140	10,847,115	▲506,025	▲4.7%
8	Michigan	9,938,444	9,295,297	▲643,147	▲6.9%
9	New Jersey	8,414,350	7,730,188	▲684,162	▲8.9%
10	Georgia	8,186,453	6,478,216	▲1,708,237	▲26.4%
11	North Carolina	8,049,313	6,628,637	▲1,420,676	▲21.4%
12	Virginia	7,078,515	6,187,358	▲891,157	▲14.4%
13	Massachusetts	6,349,097	6,016,425	▲332,672	▲5.5%
14	Indiana	6,080,485	5,544,159	▲536,326	▲9.7%
15	Washington	5,894,121	4,866,692	▲1,027,429	▲21.1%
16	Tennessee	5,689,283	4,877,185	▲812,098	▲16.7%
17	Missouri	5,595,211	5,117,073	▲478,138	▲9.3%
18	Wisconsin	5,363,675	4,891,769	▲471,906	▲9.6%
19	Maryland	5,296,486	4,781,468	▲515,018	▲10.8%
20	Arizona	5,130,632	3,665,228	▲1,465,404	▲40.0%
21	Minnesota	4,919,479	4,375,099	▲544,380	▲12.4%
22	Louisiana	4,468,976	4,219,973	▲249,003	▲5.9%
23	Alabama	4,447,100	4,040,587	▲406,513	▲10.1%
24	Colorado	4,301,261	3,294,394	▲1,006,867	▲30.6%
25	Kentucky	4,041,769	3,685,296	▲356,473	▲9.7%
26	South Carolina	4,012,012	3,486,703	▲525,309	▲15.1%
27	Oklahoma	3,450,654	3,145,585	▲305,069	▲9.7%
28	Oregon	3,421,399	2,842,321	▲579,078	▲20.4%
29	Connecticut	3,405,565	3,287,116	▲118,449	▲3.6%
30	Iowa	2,926,324	2,776,755	▲149,569	▲5.4%
31	Mississippi	2,844,658	2,573,216	▲271,442	▲10.5%
32	Kansas	2,688,418	2,477,574	▲210,844	▲8.5%
33	Arkansas	2,673,400	2,350,725	▲322,675	▲13.7%
34	Utah	2,233,169	1,722,850	▲510,319	▲29.6%
35	Nevada	1,998,257	1,201,833	▲796,424	▲66.3%
36	New Mexico	1,819,046	1,515,069	▲303,977	▲20.1%
37	West Virginia	1,808,344	1,793,477	▲14,867	▲0.8%
38	Nebraska	1,711,263	1,578,385	▲132,878	▲8.4%
39	Idaho	1,293,953	1,006,749	▲287,204	▲28.5%
40	Maine	1,274,923	1,227,928	▲46,995	▲3.8%
41	New Hampshire	1,235,786	1,109,252	▲126,534	▲11.4%
42	Hawaii	1,211,537	1,108,229	▲103,308	▲9.3%
43	Rhode Island	1,048,319	1,003,464	▲44,855	▲4.5%
44	Montana	902,195	799,065	▲103,130	▲12.9%
45	Delaware	783,600	666,168	▲117,432	▲17.6%
46	South Dakota	754,844	696,004	▲58,840	▲8.5%
47	North Dakota	642,200	638,800	▲3,400	▲0.5%
48	Alaska	626,932	550,043	▲76,889	▲14.0%
49	Vermont	608,827	562,758	▲46,069	▲8.2%
–	District of Columbia	572,059	606,900	▼ -34,841	▼ -5.7%
50	Wyoming	493,782	453,588	▲40,194	▲8.9%
	United States	281,421,906	248,709,873	32,712,033	13.2%

== City rankings ==
=== Top 100 ===
Rank	City	State	Population	Region
1	New York	NY	8,008,278	Northeast
2	Los Angeles	CA	3,694,820	West
3	Chicago	IL	2,896,016	Midwest
4	Houston	TX	1,953,631	South
5	Philadelphia	PA	1,517,550	Northeast
6	Phoenix	AZ	1,321,045	West
7	San Diego	CA	1,223,400	West
8	Dallas	TX	1,188,580	South
9	San Antonio	TX	1,144,646	South
10	Detroit	MI	951,270	Midwest
11	San Jose	CA	894,943	West
12	Indianapolis	IN	791,926	Midwest
13	San Francisco	CA	776,733	West
14	Jacksonville	FL	735,617	South
15	Columbus	OH	711,470	Midwest
16	Austin	TX	656,562	South
17	Baltimore	MD	651,154	South
18	Memphis	TN	650,100	South
19	Milwaukee	WI	596,974	Midwest
20	Boston	MA	589,141	Northeast
21	Washington	DC	572,059	South
22	El Paso	TX	563,662	South
23	Seattle	WA	563,374	West
24	Denver	CO	554,636	West
25	Nashville-Davidson	TN	545,524	South
26	Charlotte	NC	540,828	South
27	Fort Worth	TX	534,694	South
28	Portland	OR	529,121	West
29	Oklahoma City	OK	506,132	South
30	Tucson	AZ	486,699	West
31	New Orleans	LA	484,674	South
32	Las Vegas	NV	478,434	West
33	Cleveland	OH	478,403	Midwest
34	Long Beach	CA	461,522	West
35	Albuquerque	NM	448,607	West
36	Kansas City	MO	441,545	Midwest
37	Fresno	CA	427,652	West
38	Virginia Beach	VA	425,257	South
39	San Juan	PR	421,958	
40	Atlanta	GA	416,474	South
41	Sacramento	CA	407,018	West
42	Oakland	CA	399,484	West
43	Mesa	AZ	396,375	West
44	Tulsa	OK	393,049	South
45	Omaha	NE	390,007	Midwest
46	Minneapolis	MN	382,618	Midwest
47	Honolulu	HI	371,657	West
48	Miami	FL	362,470	South
49	Colorado Springs	CO	360,890	West
50	St. Louis	MO	348,189	Midwest
51	Wichita	KS	344,284	Midwest
52	Santa Ana	CA	337,977	West
53	Pittsburgh	PA	334,563	Northeast
54	Arlington	TX	332,969	South
55	Cincinnati	OH	331,285	Midwest
56	Anaheim	CA	328,014	West
57	Toledo	OH	313,619	Midwest
58	Tampa	FL	303,447	South
59	Buffalo	NY	292,648	Northeast
60	St. Paul	MN	287,151	Midwest
61	Corpus Christi	TX	277,454	South
62	Aurora	CO	276,393	West
63	Raleigh	NC	276,093	South
64	Newark	NJ	273,546	Northeast
65	Lexington-Fayette	KY	260,512	South
66	Anchorage	AK	260,283	West
67	Louisville	KY	256,231	South
68	Riverside	CA	255,166	West
69	St. Petersburg	FL	248,232	South
70	Bakersfield	CA	247,057	West
71	Stockton	CA	243,771	West
72	Birmingham	AL	242,820	South
73	Jersey City	NJ	240,055	Northeast
74	Norfolk	VA	234,403	South
75	Baton Rouge	LA	227,818	South
76	Hialeah	FL	226,419	South
77	Lincoln	NE	225,581	Midwest
78	Greensboro	NC	223,891	South
79	Plano	TX	222,030	South
80	Rochester	NY	219,773	Northeast
81	Glendale	AZ	218,812	West
82	Akron	OH	217,074	Midwest
83	Garland	TX	215,768	South
84	Madison	WI	208,054	Midwest
85	Fort Wayne	IN	205,727	Midwest
86	Bayamon	PR	203,499	
87	Fremont	CA	203,413	West
88	Scottsdale	AZ	202,705	West
89	Montgomery	AL	201,568	South
90	Shreveport	LA	200,145	South
91	Augusta-Richmond County	GA	199,775	South
92	Lubbock	TX	199,564	South
93	Chesapeake	VA	199,184	South
94	Mobile	AL	198,915	South
95	Des Moines	IA	198,682	Midwest
96	Grand Rapids	MI	197,800	Midwest
97	Richmond	VA	197,790	South
98	Yonkers	NY	196,086	Northeast
99	Spokane	WA	195,629	West
100	Glendale	CA	194,973	West

== Locations of 50 most populous cities ==
Location of 50 largest cities by population in the United States in 2000

== Population profile ==
The U.S. resident population includes the total number of people in the 50 states and the District of Columbia. The Bureau also enumerated the residents of the U.S. territory of Puerto Rico; its population was 3,808,610, an 8.1% increase over the number from a decade earlier.

In an introduction to a more detailed population profile (see references below), the Census Bureau highlighted the following facts about U.S. population dynamics:

- 75% of respondents said they were White or Caucasian and no other race;
- Hispanics accounted for 12.5% of the U.S. population, up from 9% in 1990;
- 12.4% (34.5 million Americans) were of German descent;
- 12.3% were of Black or African American descent;
- 3.6% of respondents were Asian;
- 2.4% (6.8 million Americans) of respondents were multiracial (2 or more races). The 2000 census was the first time survey options for multiracial Americans were provided.
- Between 1990 and 2000, the population aged 45 to 54 grew by 49% and those aged 85 and older grew 38%;
- Women outnumbered men two to one among those aged 85 and older;
- Almost one in five adults had some type of disability in 1997 and the likelihood of having a disability increased with age;
- Families (as opposed to men or women living alone) still dominated American households, but less so than they did thirty years ago;
- Since 1993, both families and non-families have seen median household incomes rise, with "households headed by a woman without a spouse present" growing the fastest;
- People in married-couple families had the lowest poverty rates;
- The poor of any age were more likely than others to lack health insurance coverage;
- The number of elementary and high school students in 2000 fell just short of the all-time high of 49 million reached in 1970;
- Improvements in educational attainment cross racial and ethnic lines; and
- The majority (51%) of U.S. households had access to computers; 42% had Internet access.

== Changes in population ==
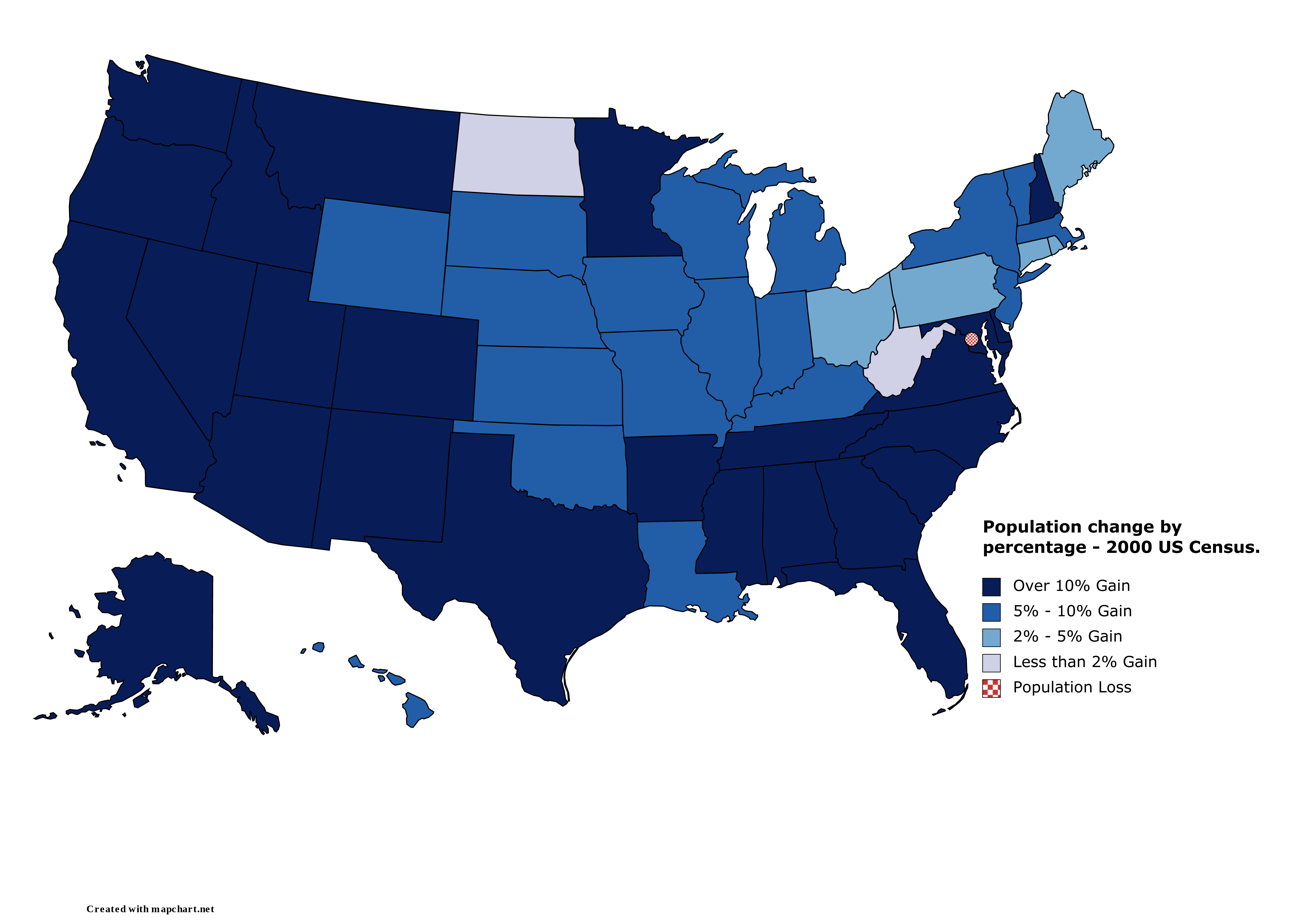
A map showing the population change of each US State by percentage.

Regionally, the South and West experienced the bulk of the nation's population increase: 14,790,890 and 10,411,850, respectively. This meant that the mean center of U.S. population moved to Phelps County, Missouri. The Northeastern United States grew by 2,785,149; the Midwest by 4,724,144.

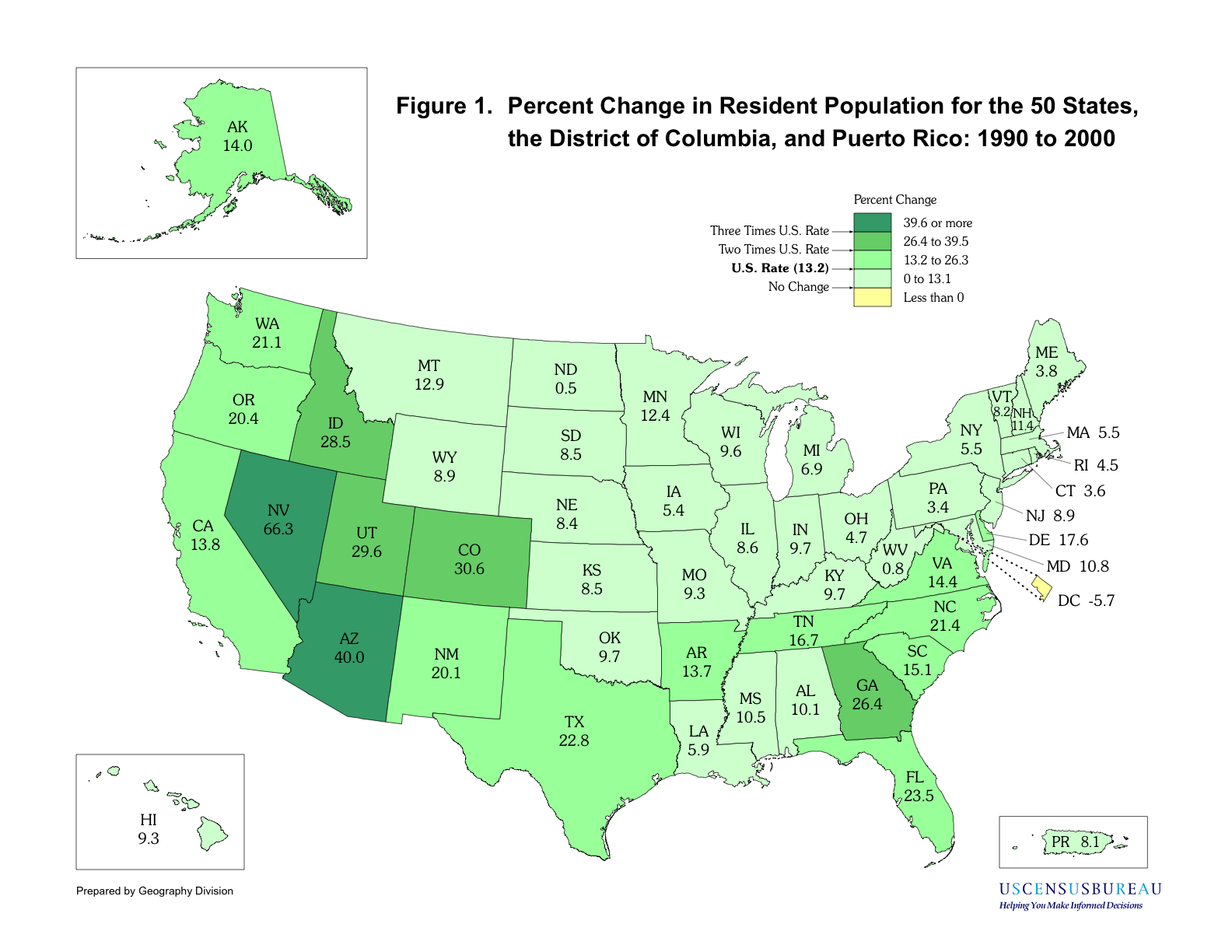

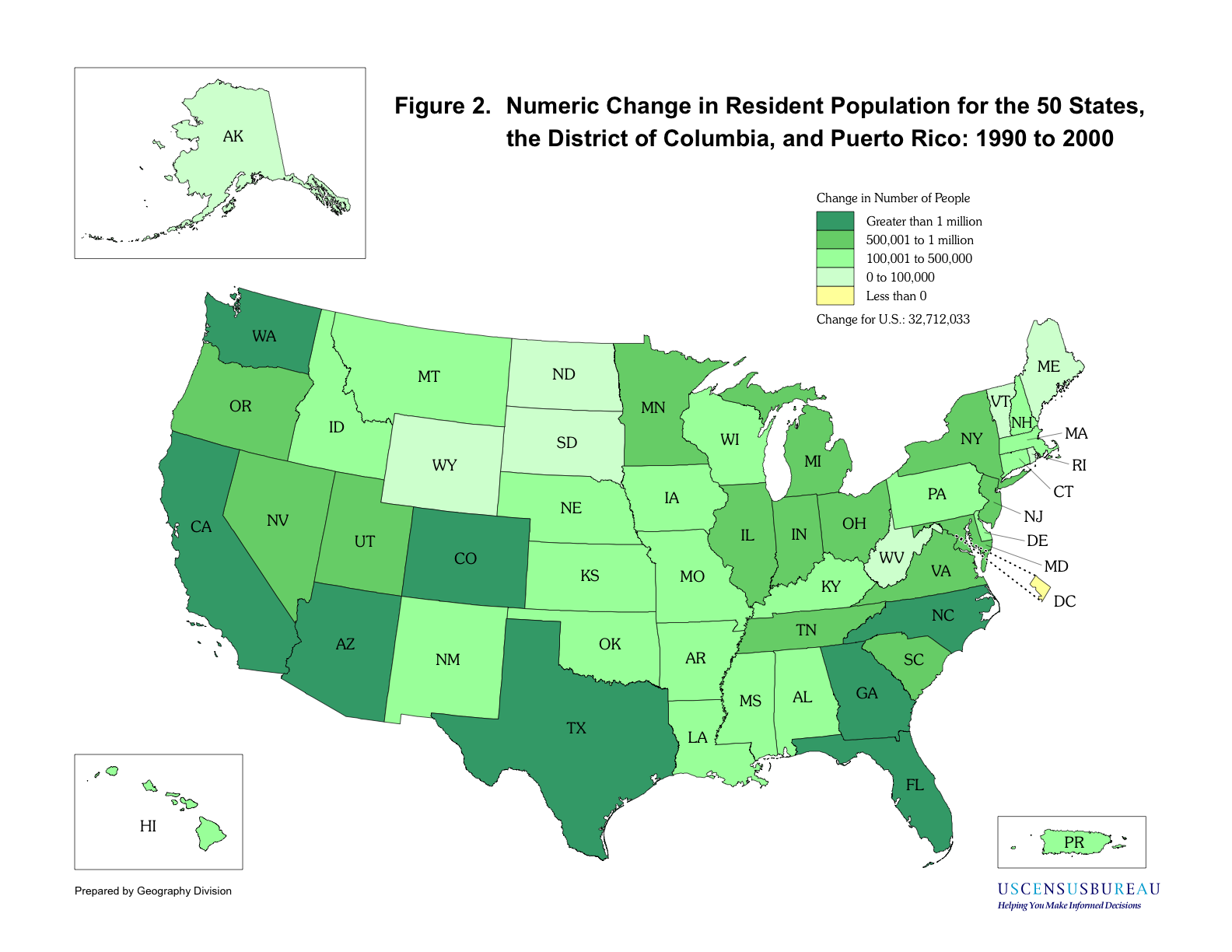

(maps not to scale)

== Reapportionment ==

The results of the census are used to determine how many congressional districts each state is apportioned. Congress defines the formula, in accordance with Title 2 of the U.S. Code, to reapportion among the states the 435 seats in the United States House of Representatives. The apportionment population consists of the resident population of the fifty states, plus the overseas military and federal civilian employees and their dependents living with them who could be allocated to a state. Each member of the House represents a population of about 647,000. The populations of the District of Columbia and Puerto Rico are excluded from the apportionment population because they do not have voting seats in the U. S. House of Representatives.

Since the first census in 1790, the decennial count has been the basis for the United States representative form of government. Article I, Section II specifies that "The Number of Representatives shall not exceed one for every thirty Thousand, but each State shall have at Least one Representative." In 1790, each member of the House represented about 34,000 residents. Since then, the House more than quadrupled in size, and in 1911 the number of representatives was fixed at 435. Today, each member represents about 20 times as many constituents.

== Adjustment controversy ==
In the years leading up to the 2000 census, there was substantial controversy over whether the Bureau should adjust census figures based on a follow-up survey, called the post-enumeration survey, of a sample of blocks. (In 1999, the Supreme Court ruled 5–4 that the Constitution prohibits the use of such figures for apportionment purposes, but it may be permissible for other purposes where feasible.) The controversy was partly technical, but also partly political, since based on data from the 1990 census both parties believed that adjustment would likely have the effect, after redistricting, of slightly increasing Democratic representation in legislative bodies, but would also give Utah an additional, probably Republican, representative to Congress.

Following the census, discrepancies between the adjusted census figures and demographic estimates of population change could not be resolved in time to meet legal deadlines for the provision of redistricting data, and the Census Bureau therefore recommended that the unadjusted results be used for this purpose. This recommendation was followed by the Secretary of Commerce (the official in charge of making the determination).

== Utah controversy ==
After the census was tabulated, Utah challenged the results in two different ways. Utah was extremely close to gaining a fourth congressional seat, falling 857 people short, which in turn was allocated to North Carolina. The margin was later shortened to 80 people, after the federal government discovered that it overcounted the population of North Carolina by 2,673 residents. The Census Bureau counted members of the military and other federal civilian employees serving abroad as residents of their home state but did not count other people living outside the United States. Utah claimed that people traveling abroad as religious missionaries should be counted as residents and that the failure to do so imposed a burden on Mormon religious practice. Almost half of all Mormon missionaries, more than 11,000 people, were from Utah; only 102 came from North Carolina. If this policy were changed, then Utah would have received an additional seat instead of North Carolina. On November 26, 2002, the Supreme Court affirmed the lower court ruling that rejected Utah's efforts to have Mormon missionaries counted.

The state of Utah then filed another lawsuit alleging that the statistical methods used in computing the state populations were improper and cost Utah the seat. The Bureau uses a method called imputation to assign a number of residents to addresses where residents cannot be reached after multiple efforts. While nationwide the imputation method added 0.4% to the population, the rate in Utah was 0.2%. The state challenged that the use of imputation violates the Census Act of 1957 and that it also fails the Constitution's requirement in Article I, Section 2 that an "actual enumeration" be used for apportionment. This case, Utah v. Evans, made it to the Supreme Court, but Utah was again defeated.

== Gay and lesbian controversy ==
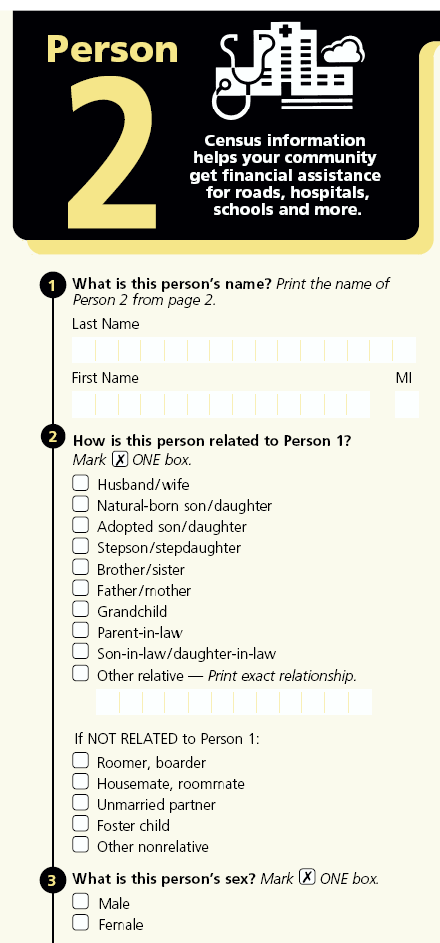
Census 2000 Long Form Questionnaire showing the Person 2 section including questions 2 and 3 which allow data to be compiled regarding same-sex partners

The census forms did not include any questions regarding sexual orientation, making it impossible to compile data comparing heterosexual and homosexual populations. However, two questions were asked that allowed same-sex partnerships to be counted. The questionnaires asked the sex of each person in a household and they asked what the relationship was between each of the members of the household. Respondents could check "Husband/wife" or "unmarried partner" or a number of other relationships. Responses were tabulated and the Census Bureau reported that there were more than 658,000 same-sex couples heading households in the United States. However, only about 25% of gay men and 40% of lesbians are in shared-household partnerships at any one time, according to non-census surveys. For every same-sex couple tallied in the census, there could be three to six more homosexual un-partnered individuals who would not be counted as gay. The census reported that same-sex male couples numbered 336,001 and female same-sex couples numbered 329,522. Extrapolating from those figures and the surveyed partnering habits of homosexuals, as many as 4.3 million homosexual adults could have been living in the U.S. in 2000. The exact number cannot be known because the census did not count them specifically. Bisexual and transgender populations were not counted, either, because there were no questions regarding this information. Also unavailable is the number of additional same-sex couples living under the same roof as the first, though this applies to additional heterosexual couples as well. The lack of accurate numbers makes it difficult for lawmakers who are considering legislation on hate crimes or social services for gay families with children. It also makes for less accuracy when predicting the fertility of a population.

Another issue that concerned gay rights advocates involved the automatic changing of data during the tabulation process. This automatic software data compiling method, called allocation, was designed to counteract mistakes and discrepancies in returned questionnaires. Forms that were filled out by two same-sex persons who checked the "Husband/wife" relationship box were treated as a discrepancy. The Census Bureau explained that same-sex "Husband/wife" data samples were changed to "unmarried partner" by computer processing methods in 99% of the cases. In the remaining 1%, computer systems used one of two possibilities: a) one of the two listed sexes was changed, making the partnership appear heterosexual, or b) if the two partners were more than 15 years apart in age, they might have been reassigned into a familial parent/child relationship. The process of automatic reassignment of same-sex marriage data was initiated so that the Census Bureau would not contravene the Defense of Marriage Act passed in 1996. The Act states:

In determining the meaning of any Act of Congress, or of any ruling, regulation or interpretation of the various administrative bureaus and agencies of the United States, the word 'marriage' means only a legal union between one man and one woman as husband and wife, and the word 'spouse' refers only to a person of the opposite sex who is a husband or wife.

With allocation moving married same-sex couples to the unmarried partner category, social scientists lost information that could have been extracted relating to the social stability of a same-gender couple who identify themselves as married.
