= North Atlantic Population Project =

The North Atlantic Population Project (NAPP) is a collaboration of historical demographers in Britain, Canada, Denmark, Germany, Iceland, Norway, and Sweden to produce a massive census microdata collection for the North Atlantic Region in the late-nineteenth century. The database includes complete individual-level census enumerations for each country, and provides information on over 110 million people. This large scale allows detailed analysis of small geographic areas and population subgroups.

The NAPP database is designed to be compatible with the Integrated Public Use Microdata Series (IPUMS), and is disseminated through the IPUMS data-access system at the Minnesota Population Center, University of Minnesota. Major collaborators on the project include Lisa Dillon, University of Montreal; Chad Gaffield, University of Ottawa; Ólöf Garðarsdóttir, Statistics Iceland; Marianne Jarnes Erikstad, University of Tromsø; Jan Oldervall University of Bergen; Evan Roberts, University of Minnesota; Steven Ruggles, University of Minnesota; Kevin Schürer, UK Data Archive; Gunnar Thorvaldsen, University of Tromsø; and Matthew Woollard, UK Data Archive. The project is also coordinated by the Minnesota Population Center at the University of Minnesota.

== See also ==
- National Historical Geographic Information System
