= Minnesota Population Center =

University interdisciplinary research center

The Minnesota Population Center (MPC) is a university-wide interdisciplinary research center at the University of Minnesota. MPC was established in 2000, absorbing two earlier population research organizations. The primary goals of the center are to foster large-scale cross-disciplinary research collaborations and to provide shared infrastructure for demographic research. The center now has 100 faculty affiliates from 10 University of Minnesota Colleges, over 50 graduate student affiliates and 120 administrative and research staff.

== Overview ==
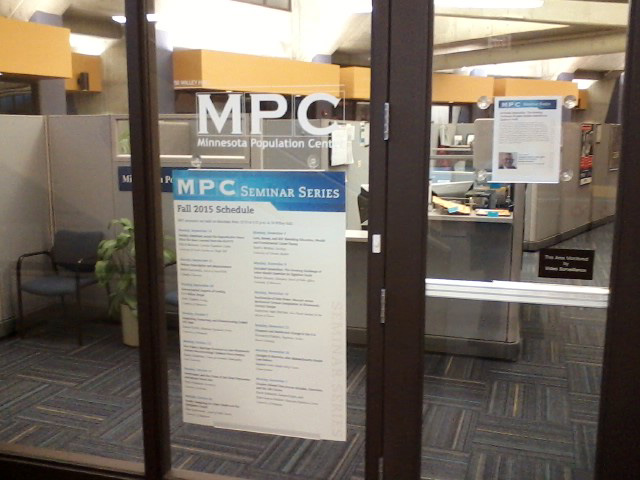
The Minnesota Population Center on the campus of the University of Minnesota

The primary activity of MPC is demographic research; work at the center is divided into eight major themes:

- Large-scale demographic data infrastructure
- Work, family, and time-use
- Historical demography
- Education, labor, and the life-course
- Healthcare access and health disparities
- Census and survey methodology
- Unions and sexuality
- Population and environment

MPC is the producer and distributor of the world's largest demographic data collections. These data collections include the Integrated Public Use Microdata Series (IPUMS), the National Historical Geographic Information System (NHGIS), the North Atlantic Population Project (NAPP), and the Integrated Health Interview Series (IHIS). Over 40,000 demographic researchers worldwide are registered to use these data collections.

== See also ==
- Integrated Public Use Microdata Series (IPUMS)
