= IPUMS =

World's largest individual-level population database

IPUMS, originally the Integrated Public Use Microdata Series, is the world's largest individual-level population database. IPUMS consists of microdata samples from United States (IPUMS-USA) and international (IPUMS-International) census records, as well as data from U.S. and international surveys. The records are converted into a consistent format and made available to researchers through a web-based data dissemination and analysis system.

IPUMS is housed at the Institute for Social Research and Data Innovation (ISRDI), an interdisciplinary research center at the University of Minnesota, under the direction of Professor Steven Ruggles.

== Description ==
IPUMS includes all persons enumerated in the United States censuses from 1850 to 1950 (though, the 1890 census is missing because it was destroyed in a fire) and from the American Community Survey since 2000 and the Current Population Survey since 1962. IPUMS includes household-level data for United States Censuses from 1790 to 1840, due to the first six censuses only including the name of the head of household, with tallied household totals following. IPUMS provides consistent variable names, coding schemes, and documentation across all the samples, facilitating the analysis of long-term change.

IPUMS-International includes countries from Africa, Asia, Europe, and Latin America for 1960 forward. The database currently includes more than a billion individuals enumerated in 365 censuses from 94 countries around the world. IPUMS-International converts census microdata for multiple countries into a consistent format, allowing for comparisons across countries and time periods. Special efforts are made to simplify use of the data while losing no meaningful information. Comprehensive documentation is provided in a coherent form to facilitate comparative analyses of social and economic change.

Additional databases in the IPUMS family include the:

- North Atlantic Population Project (NAPP)
- IPUMS National Historical Geographic Information System (NHGIS)
- IPUMS Health Surveys
- IPUMS Global Health
- IPUMS Time Use

The Journal of American History described the effort as "One of the great archival projects of the past two decades." Liens Socio, the French portal for the social sciences, gave IPUMS the only “best site” designation that has gone to any non-French website, writing “IPUMS est un projet absolument extraordinaire...époustouflante [mind-blowing]!”

The official motto of IPUMS is "use it for good, never for evil." All public IPUMS data and documentation are available online free of charge.
