= National Historical Geographic Information System =

Historical GIS project

Logo for the NHGIS

The National Historical Geographic Information System (NHGIS) is a historical GIS project to create and freely disseminate a database incorporating all available aggregate census information for the United States between 1790 and 2010. The project has created one of the largest collections in the world of statistical census information, much of which was not previously available to the research community because of legacy data formats and differences between metadata formats. The statistical and geographic data are disseminated free of charge through a sophisticated online data access system.

In addition, NHGIS has created historical and contemporary cartographic boundary shapefiles compatible with every census, and over 50 million lines of metadata describing the collection. Historical U.S. state and county boundaries are available 1790–present, with smaller geographies available as the U.S. Census Bureau created them. Census Tract boundaries are available 1910–present and Block Group and Block boundaries available 1990–present. The cartographic boundary files and the tabular data are formatted so as to be easily linked for use in Geographic Information System software.

NHGIS was launched in 2007 and is maintained by the Minnesota Population Center at the University of Minnesota and is funded by the National Science Foundation and the National Institutes of Health.

Much of the historical data are viewable as tables or interactive maps in Social Explorer, a small company which offers both free and professional licenses.
