= United States census =

Decennial census mandated by the US Constitution

- The Bureau of the Census is part of the United States Department of Commerce.
- Genre: census
- Frequency: Decennial
- Locations: 4600 Silver Hill Road; Suitland, Maryland 20746
- Country: United States
- Inaugurated: August 2, 1790; 236 years ago
- Most recent: April 1, 2020; 6 years ago
- Next event: April 1, 2030; 3 years' time
- Website: www.census.gov

The United States census (plural censuses or census) is a decennial census that is legally mandated by the Constitution of the United States. The first census after the American Revolution was taken in 1790 under Secretary of State Thomas Jefferson. There have been 24 federal censuses since that time. The census includes territories of the United States. The United States Census Bureau is responsible for conducting the census.

The most recent national census took place in 2020; the next census is scheduled for 2030. In September 2026, the U.S. Census Bureau proposed a change to the 2030 census that would leave out some noncitizens when calculating how many seats each state gets in the House of Representatives. Since 2013, the Census Bureau began discussions on using technology to aid data collection starting with the 2020 census. In 2020, every household received an invitation to complete the census over the Internet, by phone or by paper questionnaire. For years between the decennial censuses, the Census Bureau issues estimates made using surveys and statistical models, in particular, the Population Estimates Program and American Community Survey.

From 1940 to 2000, the census had a "long form" version, sent to only a subset of the households, with additional questions about socioeconomic and housing characteristics.

The United States census is distinct from the Census of Agriculture, which has been the responsibility for the United States Department of Agriculture (USDA) since 1997. It is also distinct from local censuses conducted by some states or local jurisdictions.

== Legal basis ==
The U.S. census is mandated by Article I, Section 2 of the United States Constitution, which states: "Representatives and direct Taxes shall be apportioned among the several States... according to their respective Numbers... . The actual Enumeration shall be made within three years after the first meeting of the Congress of the United States, and within every subsequent Term of ten Years". (Note: Constitution of the United States) Section 2 of the Fourteenth Amendment amended Article I, Section 2 to include that the "respective Numbers" of the "several States" will be determined by "counting the whole number of persons in each State, excluding Indians not taxed." The United States Census Bureau (officially the Bureau of the Census, as defined in Title 13 U.S.C. § 11) is responsible for the United States census. The Bureau of the Census is part of the United States Department of Commerce.

Title 13 of the United States Code governs how the census is conducted and how its data is handled. Information is confidential as per 13 U.S.C. § 9. The census law, coupled with the Sentencing Reform Act of 1984 (Title 18 of the United States Code, Sections 3551, 3559, and 3571), provides for penalties of up to $5,000 for not responding or for willfully providing false answers to any question.

== Procedure ==
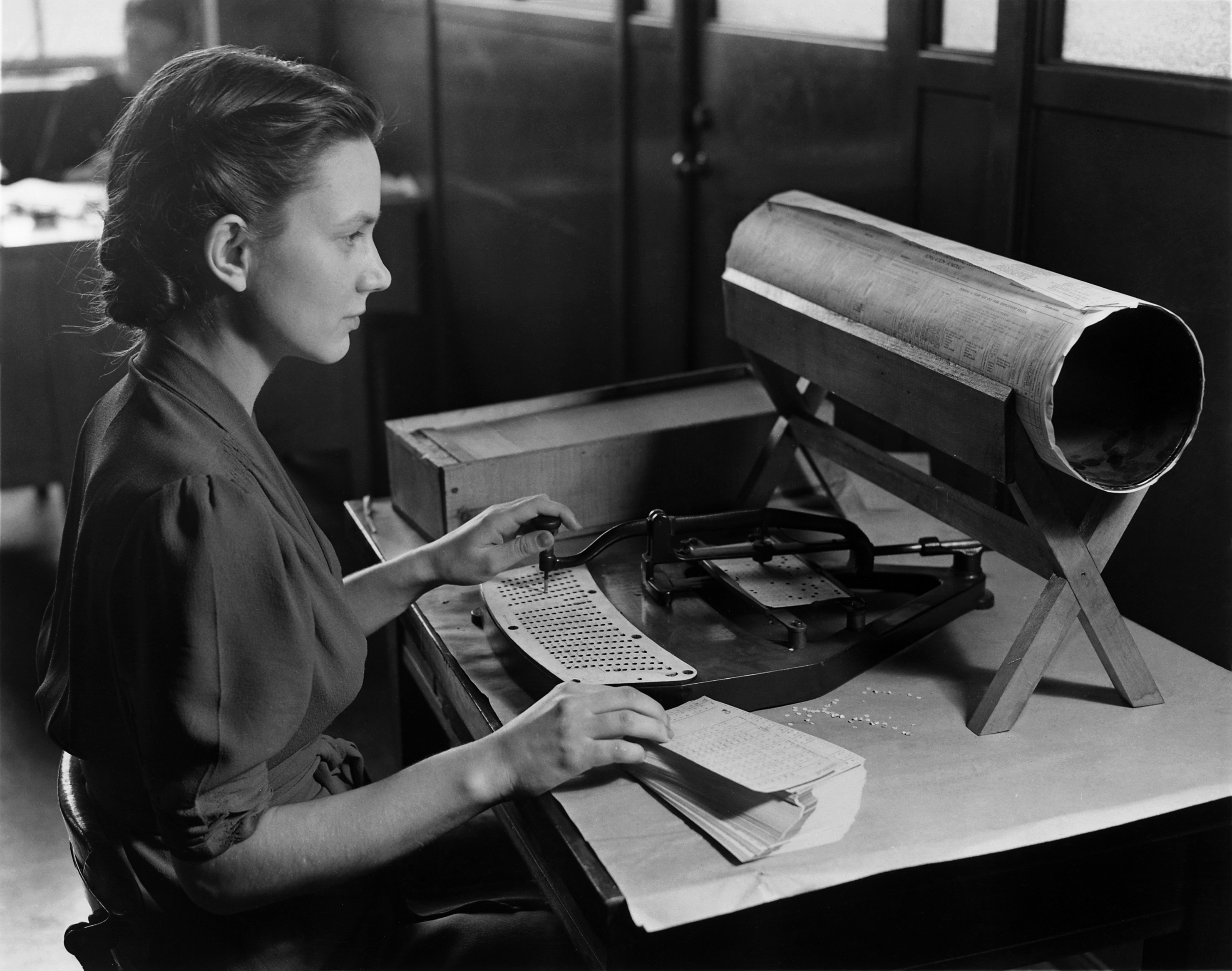
A woman with a Hollerith pantograph punch. The keyboard is for the 1940 U.S. census population card.

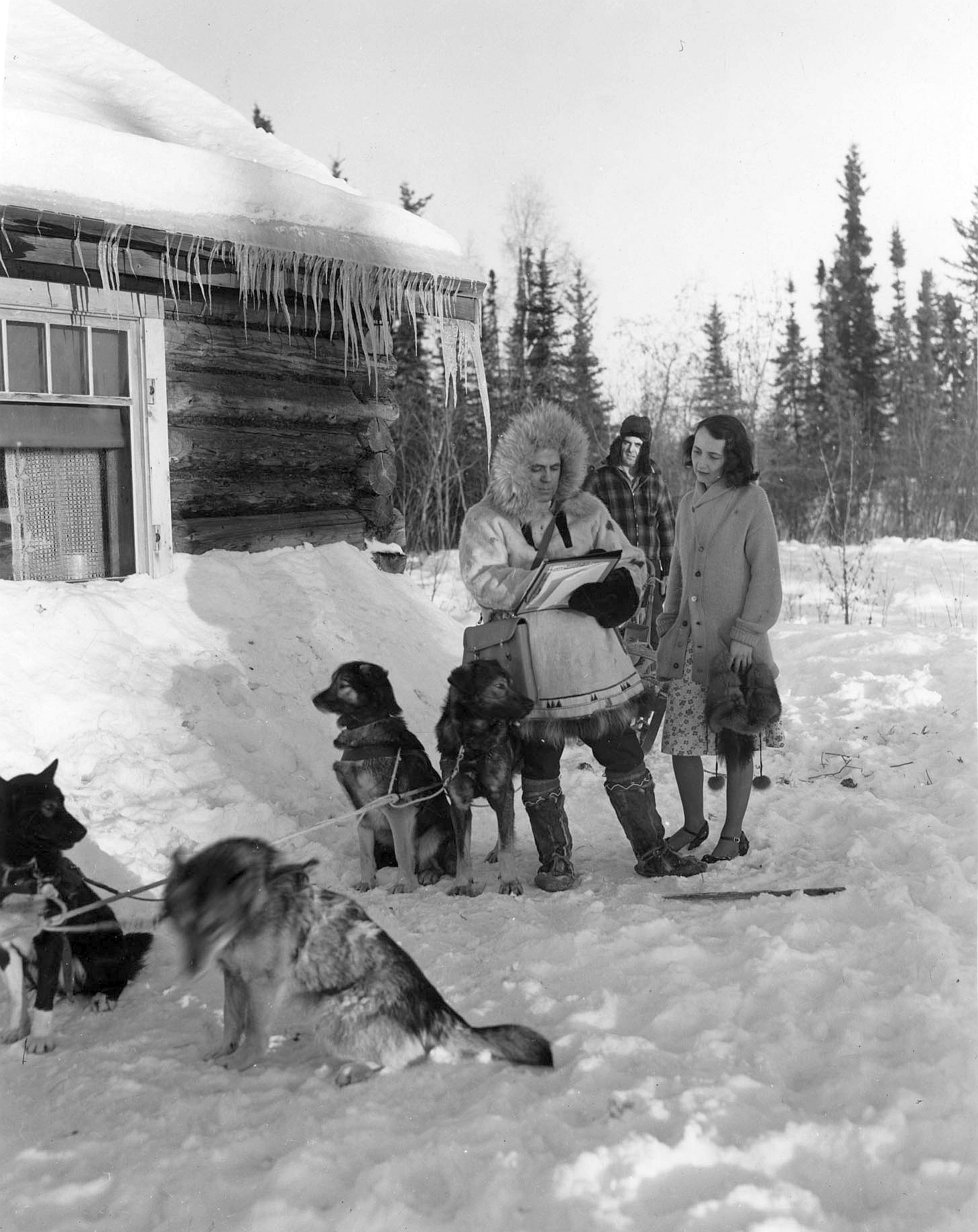
This 1940 census publicity photo shows a census worker in Fairbanks, Alaska. The dog musher remains out of earshot to maintain confidentiality.

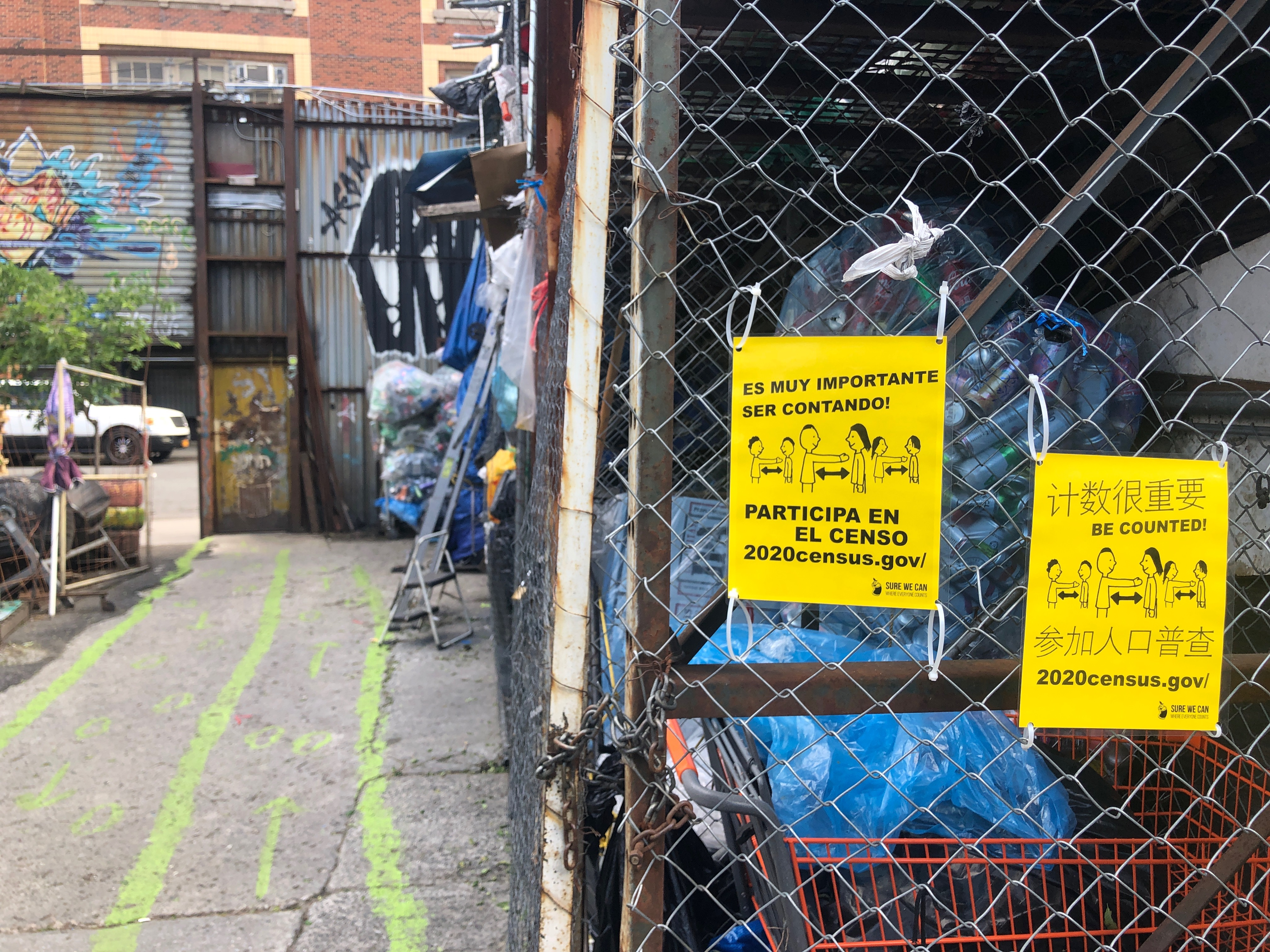
Census outreach flyers hang at Sure We Can - redemption center in Bushwick, Brooklyn - 2020

Decennial U.S. census figures are based on actual counts of persons dwelling in U.S. residential structures. They include citizens, non-citizen legal residents, non-citizen long-term visitors and undocumented immigrants. The Census Bureau bases its decision about whom to count on the concept of usual residence. Usual residence, a principle established by the Census Act of 1790, is defined as the place a person lives and sleeps most of the time. The Census Bureau uses special procedures to ensure that those without conventional housing are counted. Data from these operations are not as accurate as data obtained from traditional procedures.

In instances where the bureau is unsure of the number of residents at an address after a field visit, its population characteristics are inferred from its nearest similar neighbor (hot-deck imputation). This practice has effects across many areas, but is seen by some as controversial. The practice was ruled constitutional by the U.S. Supreme Court in Utah v. Evans.

Certain American citizens living overseas are specifically excluded from being counted in the census even though they may vote. Only Americans living abroad who are "federal employees (military and civilian) and their dependents living overseas with them" are counted. "Private U.S. citizens living abroad who are not affiliated with the federal government (either as employees or their dependents) will not be included in the overseas counts. These overseas counts are used solely for reapportioning seats in the U.S. House of Representatives".

According to the Census Bureau, "Census Day" has been April 1 since 1930. Previously, from 1790 to 1820, the census counted the population as of the first Monday in August. It moved to June 1 in 1830, June 2 in 1890, April 15 in 1910, and January 1 in 1920.

Because people are born, die, and move during the year, the census counts people where they were or expect to be living on this specific reference date in an attempt to get a coherent snapshot and avoid double counting. The actual census-taking begins before this date and extends for months thereafter. In 2020, the earliest responses were collected starting January 21 in remote parts of Alaska, and March 12 for most Americans.

== Applications ==
In addition to its primary purpose of reapportioning the House of Representatives, census data are used for a wide variety of applications, including:

- Apportionment of federal funding in a large number of programs, estimated at somewhere between $675 billion and $1.5 trillion per year.
- Infrastructure and transportation planning
- Military and disaster response planning
- Economic analysis
- Commercial investment and marketing decisions
- Computer programs that can disambiguate place names based on which has the highest population
- General reference works

== Controversy ==
California Governor Gavin Newsom encouraging people to complete the 2020 United States census.

The census has historically and up to the present been controversial due to its role in reapportioning political representation. In the 1850s, census planners suppressed information about slavery due to pressure from Southern lawmakers. The results of the 1920 census were ignored and no reapportionment took place, as rural lawmakers feared losing power to urban areas. In the 1940s, census officials were involved in organizing Japanese-American internment.

Up to one-third of all U.S. residents do not respond to repeated reminders. In recent censuses, the nonresponse rate has been less than 1% (it was about 0.4% in 2010), however in September 2020 many experts believed the nonresponse rate could reach double digits in that year's census. This fear originated from the Trump administration cutting the bureau's timeline for the census in half, causing demographers to fear that it would undercount immigrants, the poor, and people of color. By October 19, 2020, all states had topped a 99% response rate, with all but one state having a nonresponse rate below 0.1%.

The Census Bureau estimates that in 1970 over six percent of African Americans went uncounted, whereas only around two percent of European Americans went uncounted. Democrats often argue that modern sampling techniques should be used so that more accurate and complete data can be inferred. Republicans often argue against such sampling techniques, stating the U.S. Constitution requires an "actual enumeration" for apportionment of House seats, and that political appointees would be tempted to manipulate the sampling formulas.

Groups like the Prison Policy Initiative assert that the census practice of counting prisoners as residents of prisons, not their pre-incarceration addresses, leads to misleading information about racial demographics and population numbers.

=== 2020 ===
The 2020 census drew a number of controversies and legal challenges under the Trump administration due to President Donald Trump's policies on illegal immigration, particularly those undocumented in the country. Prior to the publication of the census, the Commerce Department stated its intention to add a question asking responders about their immigration status, which many states and activists stated would cause illegal immigrants to not respond out of fear of prosecution and lead to undercounting, affecting state representation and federal funding. The Supreme Court case Department of Commerce v. New York, decided in June 2019, found the rationale to add the question was arbitrary and capricious and required the department to provide a better reasoning before inclusion. The department dropped the question by the form's publication time. Following the decision, Trump issued an executive order directing the department to obtain citizenship data from other federal agencies rather than via the census. On July 21, 2020, Trump signed a presidential memorandum ordering the exclusion of illegal immigrants from the numbers in the 2020 census that are used to apportion seats in the House of Representatives.

The COVID-19 pandemic made the collection of the census results difficult, and the department had extended the deadline to complete collection to October 31 instead of July 31, 2020. On August 3, the department announced its Replan Schedule that would end collection early on September 30, aware this would leave them with incomplete data that they would have to estimate total numbers to complete. This move was again challenged in the courts. While lower courts had ruled for an injunction against the department from implementing the Replan Schedule, the Supreme Court issued a stay of the injunction in October 2020, allowing the census to end early.

Around the same time, Trump issued a memo to the Commerce Department on July 21, 2020, instructing them to use estimates of undocumented immigrants and subtract their numbers from the totals, claiming that he had the authority to make this determination on a Constitutional and past legal basis. Several legal challenges were filed, and a combined suit from 22 states and several non-governmental organizations were found against Trump, ruling that only Congress has the authority to interpret the manner of which people the census includes. Trump petitioned to the Supreme Court which certified the case Trump v. New York for an expedited hearing in November, given the results were to be delivered to Congress by December 31, 2020. The Court issued a per curiam decision on December 18, 2020, which vacated the District Court's ruling and remanded the case to that court with orders to dismiss it.

== History ==
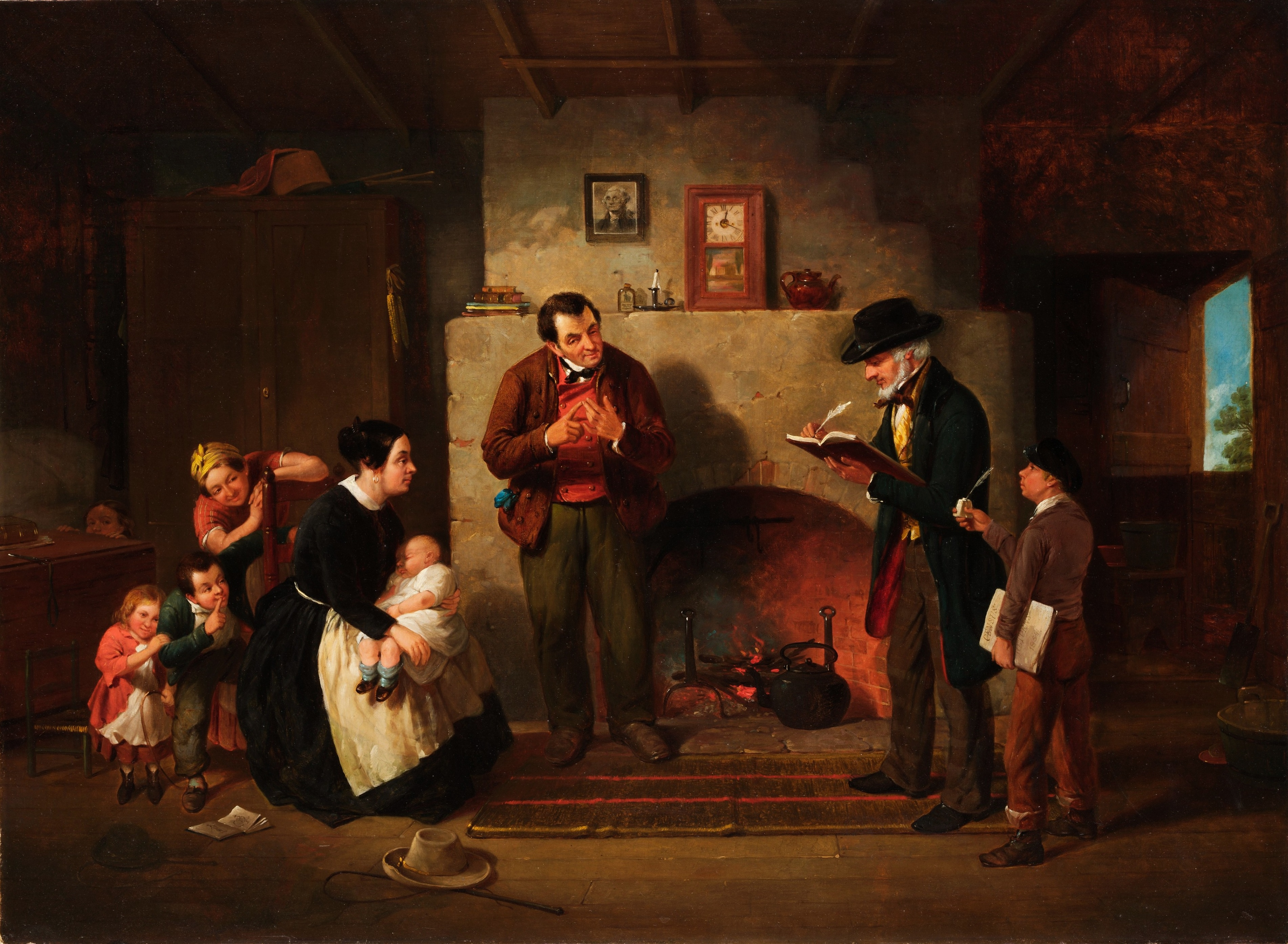
Taking the Census by Francis William Edmonds (1854) is the earliest known depiction of the census-taking process.

Censuses had been taken prior to the Constitution's ratification; in the early 17th century, a census was taken in Virginia, and people were counted in almost all of the British colonies that became the United States. Between 1781 and 1786, the first "actual enumeration" was conducted separately in each state and compiled by John Kean for consideration at the Constitutional Convention in 1787.

Throughout the years, the country's needs and interests became more complicated. This meant that statistics were needed to help people understand what was happening and have a basis for planning. The content of the decennial census changed accordingly. In 1810, the first inquiry on manufactures, quantity and value of products occurred; in 1840, inquiries on fisheries were added; and in 1850, the census included inquiries on social issues, such as taxation, churches, pauperism, and crime. The censuses also spread geographically, to new states and territories added to the Union, as well as to other areas under U.S. sovereignty or jurisdiction. There were so many more inquiries of all kinds in the census of 1880 that almost a full decade was needed to publish all the results. In response to this, the census was mechanized in 1890, with tabulating machines made by Herman Hollerith. This reduced the processing time to two and a half years.

For the first six censuses (1790–1840), enumerators recorded only the names of the heads of household and a general demographic accounting of the remaining members of the household. Beginning in 1850, all members of the household were named on the census. The first slave schedules were also completed in 1850, with the second (and last) in 1860. Censuses of the late 19th century also included agricultural and industrial schedules to gauge the productivity of the nation's economy. Mortality schedules (taken between 1850 and 1880) captured a snapshot of life spans and causes of death throughout the country.

The first nine censuses (1790–1870) were conducted by U.S. Marshals before the Census Bureau was created. Appointed U.S. Marshals of each judicial district hired assistant marshals to conduct the actual enumeration. The census enumerators were typically from the village or neighborhood and often knew the residents. Before enabling self-identification on the censuses, the U.S. Census Bureau relied on local people to have some knowledge of residents. Racial classification was made by the census enumerator in these decades, rather than by the individual.

Year	Total population	Change in population	Most populated state	Most populated city	Ethnic demographics counted	Slaves	Notes
1790 (Note: August 2, 1790)	3,929,326 (Note: The number originally published in 1790 was 3,893,635.)	—	Virginia (747,610)	New York, NY (33,131)	Free white females and males, other free persons, slaves	694,280	Original numbers were corrected later.
1800 (Note: August 4, 1800)	5,308,483 (Note: The number originally published in 1800 was 5,172,312.)	▲35%	Virginia (Note: At the time of the 1800 Census, the territory donated to form the District of Columbia was still being administered by the states of Maryland and Virginia. The state of Maryland included the population of the District under its control within its own return. The population of the District of Columbia within Maryland was 8,144 persons, including 5,672 whites, 400 free blacks, and 2,472 enslaved persons.) (676,682)	New York, NY (60,515)	Free white females and males, other free persons, slaves	893,605 (Note: The number originally published in 1800 was 875,626.)	Original numbers were corrected later.
1810 (Note: August 6, 1810)	7,239,881	▲36%	New York (959,049)	New York, NY (96,373)	Free white females and males, other free persons, slaves	1,191,362	The authorizing act of the third census stipulated that each marshal (enumerator) must personally visit each household, rather than rely on hearsay.
1820 (Note: August 7, 1820)	9,638,453	▲33%	New York (1,372,812)	New York, NY (123,706)	Free white females and males, other free persons, free people of color, slaves	1,538,022	—
1830 (Note: June 1, 1830)	12,866,020	▲33%	New York (1,918,608)	New York, NY (202,589)	Free white females and males, other free persons, free people of color, slaves	2,009,043	—
1840 (Note: June 1, 1840)	17,069,453	▲33%	New York (2,428,921)	New York, NY (312,710)	Free white females and males, other free persons, free people of color, slaves	2,487,355	The census estimated the population of the United States at 17,100,000. The results were tabulated by 28 clerks in the Bureau of the Census.
1850 (Note: June 1, 1850)	23,191,876	▲36%	New York (3,097,394)	New York, NY (515,547)	Black, Mulatto, White	3,204,313	The 1850 census was a landmark year in American census-taking. It was the first year in which the census bureau attempted to record every member of every household, including women, children and slaves. Accordingly, the first slave schedules were produced in 1850. Prior to 1850, census records had only recorded the name of the head of the household and tabulated the other household members within given age groups.
1860 (Note: June 1, 1860)	31,443,321	▲35%	New York (3,880,735)	New York, NY (813,669)	Indian, Chinese, Black, Mulatto, White	3,953,761	The results were tabulated by 184 clerks in the Bureau of the Census. This was the first census where American indigenous people officially were counted, but only those who had 'renounced tribal rules'. The figure for the nation was 40,000.
1870 (Note: June 1, 1870)	39,818,449 (Note: The number originally published in 1870 was 38,555,983.)	▲23%	New York (4,382,759)	New York, NY (942,292)	Indian, Chinese, Black, Mulatto, White	—	The first census to provide detailed information on the black population, only years after the culmination of the Civil War when slaves were granted freedom. The results are controversial, as many believed it underestimated the true population numbers, especially in New York and Pennsylvania.
1880 (Note: June 1, 1880)	50,189,209	▲30%	New York (5,082,871)	New York, NY (1,206,299)	Indian, Chinese, Black, Mulatto, White	—	The first census that permitted women to be enumerators. Also led to the discovery of Alabama paradox.
1890 (Note: June 2, 1890) (Note: Taken one day late because June 1 was a Sunday.)	62,947,714	▲25%	New York (6,003,174)	New York, NY (1,515,301)	Indian, Chinese, Japanese, Black, Mulatto, Quadroon, Octaroon, White	—	Because it was believed that the frontier region of the United States no longer existed, the tracking of westward migration was not tabulated in the 1890 census. This trend prompted Frederick Jackson Turner to develop his milestone Frontier Thesis. The 1890 census was the first to be compiled using the new tabulating machines invented by Herman Hollerith. The net effect of the many changes from the 1880 census (the larger population, the number of data items to be collected, the Census Bureau headcount, the volume of scheduled publications, and the use of Hollerith's electromechanical tabulators) was to reduce the time required to fully process the census from eight years for the 1880 census to six years for the 1890 census. The total population, of 62,947,714, was announced after only six weeks of processing (punched cards were not used for this family, or rough, count). The public reaction to this tabulation was disbelief, as it was widely believed that the "right answer" was at least 75,000,000. This census is also notable for the fact it is one of only three for which the original data are no longer available. Almost all the population schedules were destroyed following a fire in 1921.
1900 (Note: June 1, 1900)	76,212,168	▲21%	New York (7,268,894)	New York, NY (3,437,202)	Indian, Chinese, Japanese, Black (Negro or of Negro descent), White	—	—
1910 (Note: April 15, 1910)	92,228,496	▲21%	New York (9,113,614)	New York, NY (4,766,883)	Indian, Chinese, Japanese, Black (Negro), Mulatto, White, other	—	—
1920 (Note: January 1, 1920)	106,021,537	▲15%	New York (10,385,227)	New York, NY (5,620,048)	Indian, Chinese, Filipino, Hindu, Japanese, Korean, Black (Negro), Mulatto, White, other	—	This was the first census that recorded a population exceeding 100 million.
1930 (Note: April 1, 1930) (Note: In the Alaska Territory, census-taking began on October 1, 1929.)	122,775,046	▲13%	New York (12,588,066)	New York, NY (6,930,446)	Indian, Chinese, Filipino, Hindu, Japanese, Korean, Negro, Mexican, White, other	—	—
1940 (Note: April 1, 1940)	132,164,569	▲7%	New York (13,479,142)	New York, NY (7,454,995)	Indian, Chinese, Filipino, Hindu, Japanese, Korean, Negro, White, other	—	—
1950 (Note: April 1, 1950)	150,697,361	▲14%	New York (14,830,192)	New York, NY (7,891,957)	American Indian, Chinese, Filipino, Japanese, Negro, White, other	—	The most recent census where individuals' data have now been released to the public (by the 72-year rule).
1960 (Note: April 1, 1960)	179,323,175	▲19%	New York (16,827,000)	New York, NY (7,781,984)	Aleut, American Indian, Eskimo, Chinese, Filipino, Japanese, Negro, Hawaiian, part-Hawaiian, White	—	Will be available for public inspection on April 1, 2032.
1970 (Note: April 1, 1970)	203,302,031	▲13%	California (19,953,134)	New York, NY (7,894,862)	American Indian, Chinese, Filipino, Japanese, Korean, Negro or Black, Hispanic origin, Mexican, Puerto Rican, Cuban, Central or South American, Hawaiian, White, other	—	The first census that recorded a population exceeding 200 million. Will be available for public inspection on April 1, 2042.
1980 (Note: April 1, 1980)	226,545,805	▲11%	California (23,667,902)	New York, NY (7,071,639)	Aleut, Eskimo, American Indian, Asian Indian, Chinese, Filipino, Japanese, Korean, Vietnamese, Black or Negro, Hispanic origin, Mexican, Mexican-American, Chicano, Puerto Rican, Cuban, other Hispanic, Hawaiian, Guamanian, Samoan, White, other	—	Will be available for public inspection on April 1, 2052.
1990 (Note: April 1, 1990)	248,709,873	▲10%	California (29,760,021)	New York, NY (7,322,564)	Aleut, Eskimo, American Indian, Asian or Pacific Islander, Chinese, Filipino, Korean, Vietnamese, Japanese, Asian Indian, other API, Black or Negro, Hispanic origin, Mexican, Mexican-American, Chicano, Puerto Rican, Cuban, other Hispanic, Hawaiian, Guamanian, Samoan, White, other race	—	Will be available for public inspection on April 1, 2062.
2000 (Note: April 1, 2000)	281,421,906	▲13%	California (33,871,648)	New York, NY (8,008,278)	American Indian, Alaska Native, Asian Indian, Chinese, Filipino, Japanese, Korean, Vietnamese, other Asian, Black, African American, or Negro, Hispanic origin, Mexican, Mexican-American, Chicano, Puerto Rican, Cuban, other Hispanic, Hawaiian, Guamanian or Chamorro, Samoan, other Pacific Islander, White, other race	—	Will be available for public inspection on April 1, 2072.
2010 (Note: April 1, 2010)	308,745,538	▲10%	California (37,253,956)	New York, NY (8,175,133)	American Indian, Alaska Native, Asian Indian, Chinese, Filipino, Japanese, Korean, Vietnamese, other Asian, Black, African American, or Negro, Hispanic origin, Mexican, Mexican-American, Chicano, Puerto Rican, Cuban, other Hispanic, Hawaiian, Guamanian or Chamorro, Samoan, other Pacific Islander, White, other race	—	The first short-form-only census since 1940, as the decennial long form has been replaced by the American Community Survey. The first census that recorded a population exceeding 300 million. Will be available for public inspection on April 1, 2082.
2020 (Note: April 1, 2020)	331,449,281	▲7%	California (39,538,223)	New York, NY (8,804,190)	American Indian, Alaska Native, Asian Indian, Chinese, Filipino, Japanese, Korean, Vietnamese, other Asian, Chamorro, Native Hawaiian, Samoan, other Pacific Islander, Black or African American, Hispanic, Latino or Spanish origin, Chicano, Cuban, Mexican, Mexican American, Puerto Rican, another Hispanic origin, White, some other race	—	The first U.S. census to offer options to respond online or by phone, in addition to the option to respond on a paper form as with previous censuses. Will be available for public inspection on April 1, 2092.

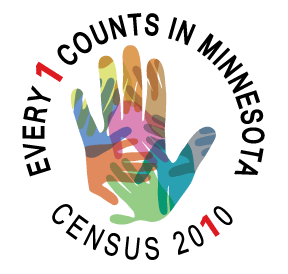
Census regional marketing logo in Minnesota.

== Respondent confidentiality ==
One purpose of the census is to divide the house seats by population. Furthermore, as with any Census Bureau survey, the data provides a beginning for the allocation of resources. In addition, collected data are used in aggregate for statistical purposes. Replies are obtained from individuals and establishments only to enable the compilation of such general statistics. The confidentiality of these replies is very important. By law, no one—neither the census takers nor any other Census Bureau employee—is permitted to reveal identifiable information about any person, household, or business.

By law (Pub. L. 95–416, 92 Stat. 915, enacted October 5, 1978), individual decennial census records are sealed for 72 years. One explanation for this number is that it was chosen in 1952 as slightly higher than the average female life expectancy, 71.6. Another explanation (which disputes the life expectancy number) is that this number is a holdover from 1942, when a disagreement between the Census Bureau and the National Archives was resolved with 1870 as the boundary between confidential and public records. The individual census data most recently released to the public is the 1950 census, released on April 1, 2022. Aggregate census data are released when available.

=== FBI data use ===
Under the administration of President Franklin D. Roosevelt, the Federal Bureau of Investigation (FBI), using primarily census records, compiled (1939–1941) the Custodial Detention Index ("CDI") on citizens, enemy aliens, and foreign nationals, who might be dangerous. The Second War Powers Act of 1941 repealed the legal protection of confidential census data, which was not restored until 1947. This information facilitated the internment of Japanese-Americans, following the Japanese attack on the U.S. at Pearl Harbor on December 7, 1941, and the internment of Italian- and German-Americans following the United States' entry into World War II.

In 1980, four FBI agents went to the Census Bureau's Colorado Springs office with warrants to seize census documents, but were forced to leave with nothing. Courts upheld that no agency, including the FBI, has access to census data.

== Data analysis ==
The census records data specific to individual respondents are not available to the public until 72 years after a given census was taken, but aggregate statistical data derived from the census are released as soon as they are available. Every census up to and including 1950 is currently available to the public and can be viewed on microfilm released by the National Archives and Records Administration, the official keeper of archived federal census records. Complete online census records can be accessed for no cost from National Archives facilities and many libraries, and a growing portion of the census is freely available from non-commercial online sources.

Census microdata for research purposes are available for all censuses from 1790 forward except for 1890 through the Integrated Public Use Microdata Series (IPUMS), and scanned copies of each of the decennial census questionnaires are available online from many websites. Computerized aggregate data describing the characteristics of small geographic areas for the entire period from 1790 to 2010 are available from the National Historical Geographic Information System.

=== Regions and divisions ===
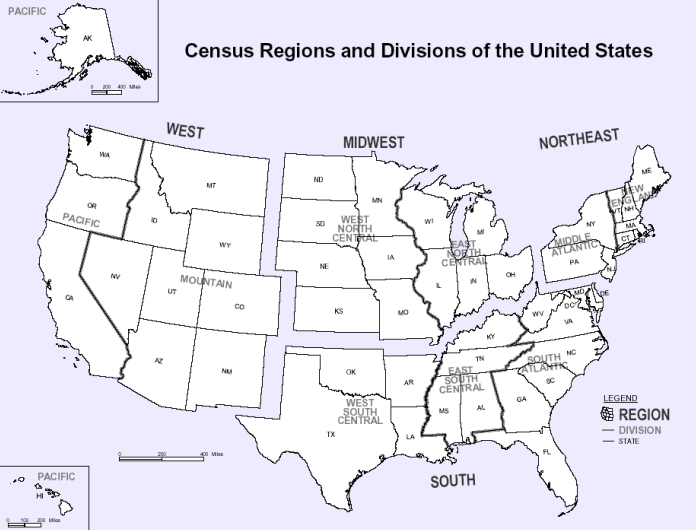
US Census Bureau Population Regions

The bureau recognizes four census regions within the United States and further organizes them into nine divisions. These regions are groupings of states that subdivide the United States for the presentation of data.

U.S. census regions
Region 1: Northeast	Region 2: Midwest	Region 3: South	Region 4: West
Division 1: New England; Division 2: Mid-Atlantic	Division 3: East North Central; Division 4: West North Central	Division 5: South Atlantic; Division 6: East South Central; Division 7: West South Central	Division 8: Mountain; Division 9: Pacific

=== Poverty measures ===
The official poverty measure (OPM), in use in America since the 1960s, defines poverty by comparing pre-tax money income to a poverty threshold that is adjusted by family composition. The pre-tax money income excludes the value of government noncash benefits provided either privately or publicly, such as health insurance, food stamps, or housing assistance. The threshold was derived from the cost of a minimum food diet multiplied by three to account for other family expenses.

The supplemental poverty measure (SPM), introduced in 2011, aims to provide a more accurate picture of the true extent of poverty in the United States than the OPM, by taking into account non-cash benefits and geographic variations in the cost-of-living. The SPM has been published by the Census Bureau since 2011 and expands the money income definition of poverty used by the official poverty measure.

== See also ==
- Norman K. Brown, known as "Mr. Census" for having worked as an enumerator on every census from 1960 to 2020
- Census-designated place (CDP), a populated community that lacks a separate municipal government
- Combined statistical area (CSA), an area that combines adjacent μSAs and MSAs
- DUALabs
- List of U.S. states by historical population, state-level U.S. census data, 1790–2020, in table form
- Race and ethnicity in the United States census
- State censuses in the United States of America
- United States metropolitan area (MSA), an area that includes adjacent communities to major cities
- United States micropolitan area (μSA), an urban area based around a core city or town with a population of 10,000 to 49,999
