= Political views of Huey Long =

The political views of Huey P. Long have often challenged historians and biographers. While most say that Louisiana Governor and Senator Huey Long was a populist, little else can be agreed on. Huey Long's opponents, both during his life and after, often drew connections between him and his ideology and far-left and right political movements, comparing his ideology to various movements such as European Fascism, Stalinism, and McCarthyism. When asked about his own political personality, Long simply replied: "Oh, hell, say that I’m sui generis and let it go at that." Writer Robert Penn Warren, whose All the King's Men revolves around a Long-like character, said "my guess is he was a remarkable set of contradictions."

The political practice based on the positions and rhetoric of Long has been colloquially referred to as Longism.

== Authoritarianism ==
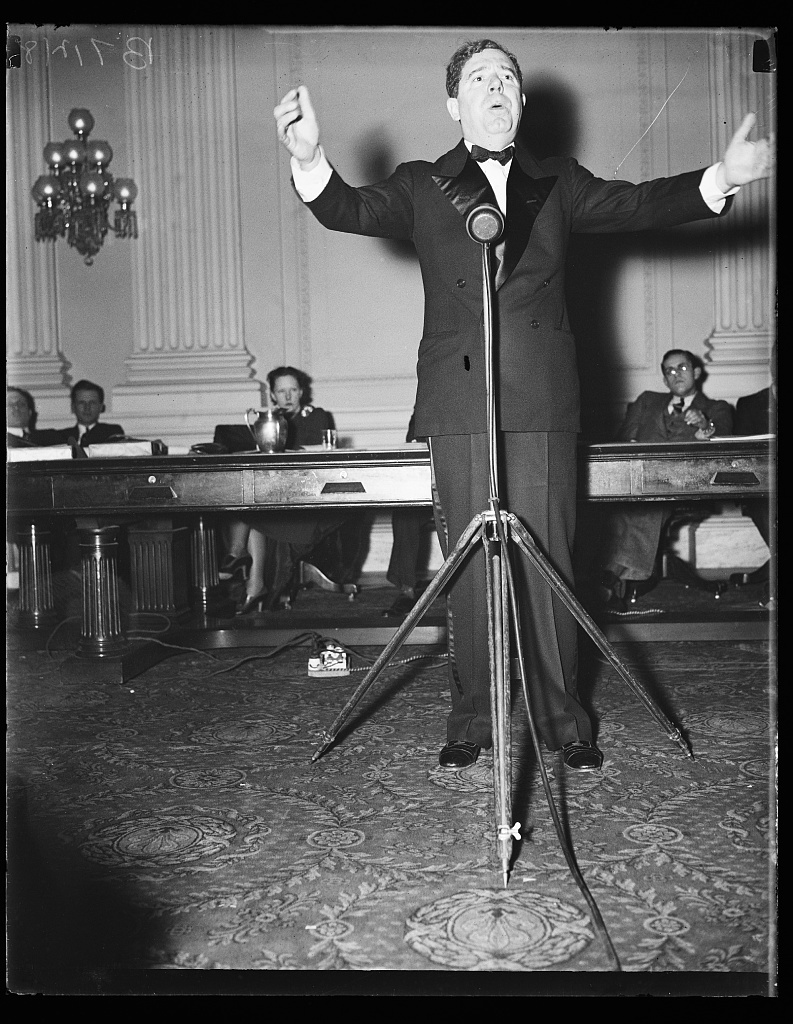
Long delivering a speech in the U.S. senate where he was known for his fiery and quick-witted oratory

Throughout his tenure in office as governor and then senior senator of Louisiana, Long was repeatedly labelled as an authoritarian and political usurper, akin to the carpetbaggers of Louisiana's past that had no respect for the rule of law. Long's machine in Louisiana was also accused of mass voter fraud via the usage of dummy candidates and having corrupt election vote counters in various state elections including the 1932 U.S. senate and gubernatorial elections and elections for amendments to the Louisiana state constitution. A federal investigation into the election of John H. Overton to the U.S. senate in 1932 grew to encompass other parts of Long's regime in Louisiana including his electoral funding processes and his use of public patronage to cement his power in the state. Responding to the attacks of voter fraud by his opponents, Long pointed out that the tactics he used were not new and had been used by his opponents in the past. Additionally, Long argued his use of dummy candidates had no direct impact on the results of Overton's election. Towards the end of the campaign of Long's own election to the U.S. senate in 1930, a man named Sam Irby who had offered claims of mass graft and fraud in Louisiana's highway commission (which was controlled by Long's machine), mysteriously disappeared. Along with Irby's disappearance came Jimmie Terrell, the former husband of Long's secretary Alice Lee Grosjean, who Long feared would potentially expose a supposed affair he had with Grosjean. According to historian T. Harry Williams, Long organized a meeting among his allies to figure out how to keep the two from talking in order to minimize any damage that may be done to his machine and his chances of winning the senatorial primary. Long would send six policemen that would carry away the drunken Irby and Terrell to an isolated camping location on Grand Isle, giving him time to take advantage of the situation, using it to attack his enemies. On a radio broadcast, Long brought Irby to address the large audience declaring that he had not been kidnapped by Huey and was safe and sound. Irby continued his message saying that he was instead trying to entrap Long's enemies, and had been attempted to be bought off by the Ransdell Camp. This maneuvering by Long prevented the scandal from seriously damaging him in any way and led to his easy win in the September 9 primary.

Long's power in the state of Louisiana ranged from holding the governorship, the state legislature, power over the state's U.S. senate seats, and various other political positions in the state. An anti-Long leader once said at the height of Long's power, "If you were for him, you could have anything you wanted. If you were against him, God help you unless you were an extraordinary man." Long was able to intimidate his opponents in the state by passing far reaching laws that would grant additional power to Long's regime. Examples of these laws stretched from allowing the governor to call out the state militia upon his own discretion, without there being any threat of rebellion or insurrection. Long aggressively pursued laws that would put additional state jobs under his control, as he viewed patronage as a key way of building his machine. This included legislation creating a civil service board that would be headed by the state's top officials, those being the governor, lieutenant governor, and secretary of state. The civil service board would be able to investigate the competence of police and fire chiefs and fire them if found to be incapable of their job. Upon an official's removal, a municipality would have to submit a successor to the removed official, which would then have to be approved by the commission. The directed target for much of the power grabs Long took during the end of his reign were primarily targeted at the city of New Orleans, a city that was the headquarters of his traditional opponents the old regulars.

== Communism ==
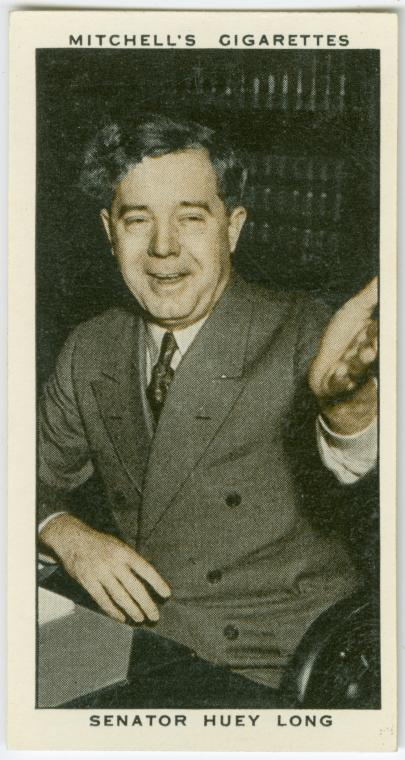
A Mitchell's cigarettes card featuring Long

During his lifetime, Long's political philosophy, particularly his Share Our Wealth program, was strongly criticized by more conservative politicians. They feared that such a scheme was decidedly communist. The former Louisiana governor Ruffin G. Pleasant, for instance, decried Long as "the 'ultra Socialist' whose views outreached 'Marx, Lenin, and Trotsky.'" Similarly, in 1935, the New York American accused Long's Share the Wealth program of being "molded in the criminal brains of the leader of the Paris Commune and sanctified in the brains of an oriental fanatic, Nicolai Lenin (sic)." He was jokingly labelled the "Karl Marx of the Hillbillies". Deflecting such attacks, Long occasionally painted Roosevelt as a communist, once suggesting that Roosevelt "hold the Democratic convention and Communist convention together and save money."

Despite claims from right-wing opponents, Long's program diverged significantly from Marxist communism. In particular, the Share Our Wealth program preserved the concepts of private property and the profit motive, while seeking to avoid any need for violent revolution. Indeed, Long himself said that his plan would strengthen the capitalist system by removing its greatest excesses, thereby removing any desire by the American people to do away with it. When asked whether his plan was communist, Huey P Long replied: "Communism? Hell no! ... This plan is the only defense this country's got against communism." Long also called his program "the only stop-gap to Communism!" When pressed by a leftist magazine who pointed out that the magnates Long railed against would be saved under his plan, he conceded, "That would be one of the unfortunate effects of my program". He concluded to the reporter: "I'd cut their nails and file their teeth and let them live."

Although conservatives labeled Long a communist, legitimate American communists sought to distance themselves from Long and his Share Our Wealth program. They believed his policies preserved the capitalist enterprise, something that Long himself admitted. The communists also believed that Long's Share Our Wealth societies diverted interest away from their own party. Some of Long's fiercest critics were prominent American communists, such as Sender Garlin and Alexander Bittelman. They argued that Long's populist rhetoric and antics belied a decidedly anti-labor philosophy; Garlin, for instance, noted that while Long constructed thousands of miles of roads and numerous bridges, the state paid its workers only 30 cents an hour—10 cents less than what the National Recovery Administration called for during the Great Depression.

== Conservatism and nationalism ==
Despite being accused of being a political extremist from the left, Long saw his own positions as strengthening the traditions of America. In a film discussing his Share Our Wealth societies, Long argued that he was upholding the promise of the Declaration of Independence to life, liberty, and the pursuit of happiness. Long's conservative streak was apparent during his crackdown on gambling and prostitution in the red light district in New Orleans after his breaking with Colonel Robert "Bow-Wow" Ewing who was a Long boss in the city. Ewing had ties to the gambling and prostitution industries in New Orleans and Long, with his disdain for both, ordered state militia, under Adjutant General of the national guard Raymond H. Fleming, to "cut out the wide-open gambling" in the city. In a great irony, the conservatives, who deplored such acts as gambling and prostitution, attacked Long for issuing the raids. Their outrage was mostly targeted against the forceful way in which the raids had been executed, with female patrons having been "held and searched for money," and guardsman having "burst into establishments with guns drawn forcing patrons to hold up their hands and back up against a wall".

Long was a strident isolationist and political nationalist who opposed American intervention abroad and was a strong supporter of tariffs, with Long labeling himself a "tariff Democrat". Along with supporting tariffs, he advocated that the American government disassociate from European efforts to settle war debts and to grant independence to the Philippines. Long argued that Standard Oil had backed rebellions across Latin America to install puppet governments that would be beholden to the company's interests. In 1934, Long claimed that Standard Oil was backing the Bolivian government to make war with Paraguay over the supposedly oil-rich northern Grand Chaco region after the latter had refused to grant favorable leasing terms to the company.

== Education ==
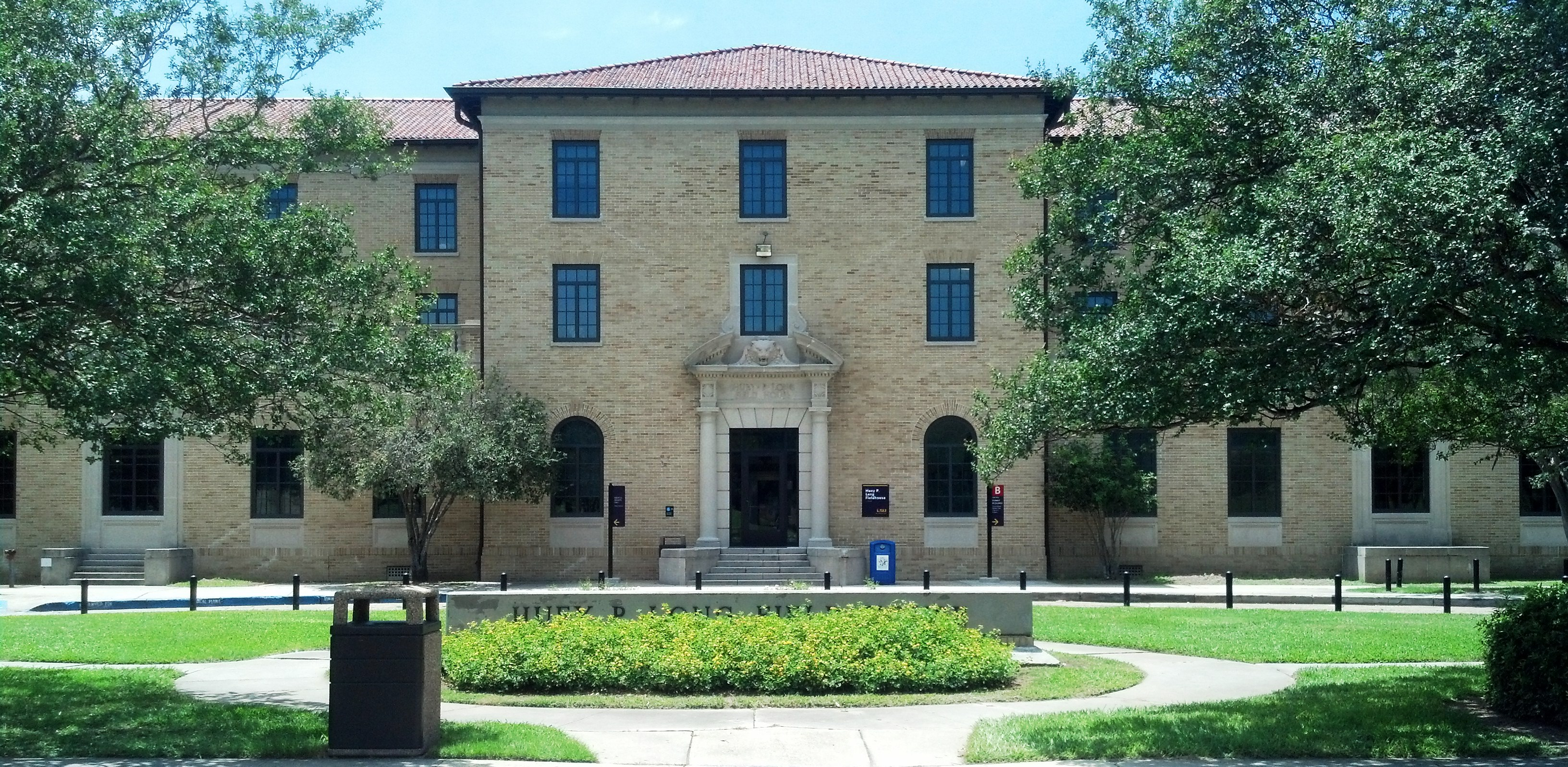
The Huey P. Long Field House at Louisiana State University, named after Long

Long's contributions to education formed a key part of his populist ideology and the modernizing of the state of Louisiana. Long's investments in the Louisiana State University (LSU), transformed the school from a third-rate, backwater state university into one of the most prestigious in the country by 1935.

Along with his investments in the state university, Long addressed the problem of widespread illiteracy in rural Louisiana. Together with superintendent of state education T.H. Harris, Long diverted tax money to fund night schools that would teach illiterate whites and African-Americans, with the classes meeting three times a week. The effect of the program was immediate in the 1930 state census as the illiterate population of whites went from ten to seven percent and that of blacks went down significantly from thirty-eight to twenty-three percent.

== Fascism ==
With the rise of fascism in 1930s Europe, many noted parallels to Long. U.S. General Hugh Johnson described Long as "the Hitler of one of our sovereign states." American fascist Lawrence Dennis described Long as "the nearest approach to a national fascist leader" in the United States. Journalist Raymond Gram Swing claimed that Long wished to "Hitlerize America". In an effort to distance Long from communism, many socialists, such as Norman Thomas, also sought to smear Long as a fascist. Communist writer Sender Garlin labelled him the "personification of the fascist menace in the United States," and noted that his swinging arm gestures were similar to those of Hitler. Alex Bittelman, a member of the Communist Party from New York wrote: "Long says he wants to do away with concentration of wealth without doing away with capitalism. This is humbug. This is fascist demagogy". Newspaper Daily Worker ran headlines such as "Huey Long – Louisiana's 'Hitler' Is Sole Lawmaker". Even Long's brother Julius claimed that he was "trying to be a Hitler."

Although often denounced as a fascist by some of his contemporaries, a number of modern historians have disagreed with these assessments. Long was not anti-Semitic, nor any more anti-Communist than most politicians at the time. When asked about common comparisons between him and Adolf Hitler, Long replied "Don't compare with that so-and-so. Anybody that lets his public policies be mixed up with religious prejudice is a plain God-damned fool." and later commented "I don't know much about Hitler. Except that last thing, about the Jews. There has never been a country that put its heel down on the Jews that ever lived afterwards." Several of Long's political and personal friends were Jews, such as Abraham Shushan and Seymour Weiss. Additionally, Long didn't espouse any anti-democratic ideology and had no conception of a corporate state. Arthur Schlesinger, Jr. noted that "Long's political fantasies had no tensions, no conflicts, except of the most banal kind, no heroism or sacrifice, no compelling myths of class or race or nation."

Life Magazine said "The late Huey P. Long, who knew all the tricks of the dissembling demagogue, was once asked: ‘Do you think we will ever have Fascism in America?’ Said the Kingfish: ‘Sure, only we’ll call it anti-Fascism’". Several other similar quotes have been credited to Long, but many challenge the validity of these quotes. George Sokolsky remembered having asked Long if he was a fascist. “Fine,” Long told him in a conversation that took place less than a year before he was killed. “I’m Mussolini and Hitler rolled into one. Mussolini [force-fed dissidents] castor oil; I’ll give them Tabasco, and then they’ll like Louisiana.” Then he laughed."

== Race ==
For much of the 20th century, most historians considered Long to be an egalitarian in terms of race; Long historian T. Harry Williams, for instance, wrote that Long was "the first Southern mass leader to leave aside race baiting and appeals to the Southern tradition and the Southern past and address himself to the social and economic problems of the present." When asked how he would treat blacks if he were to become President, Long responded, "Treat them just the same as anybody else, give them an opportunity to make a living, and to get an education." Unlike many other southern demagogues, Long resisted associating himself with the Ku Klux Klan. When KKK Imperial Wizard Hiram Evans announced plans to campaign against Long in 1934, Long declared "that Imperial bastard will never set foot in Louisiana," threatening that Evans would leave the state with "his toes turned up." Many historians also argue that Long's building projects and social reforms helped all of the lower classes in Louisiana, regardless of race.

However, conservative historian Glen Jeansonne argued that Long was "more racist, less unbiased, less principled, and less different from other Louisiana politicians of his time than the [historical] literature implies." Long had never faced a serious election that hinged on questions of race or racism. This was largely because after the Louisiana Constitution of 1898, which virtually disenfranchised blacks by raising barriers to voter registration, was ratified, "race was an irrelevant political issue" and black Louisianians "were segregated, ghettoized, ignored." Long never had to address the subject of race in politics. Jeansonne also points out that if Long intended to help black Louisianians with his social program, it seems likely that he would have attempted to engage and enfranchise more black voters so as to secure their political support. This, however, was not the case. During Long's tenure as governor, the number of registered black voters declined. In a 1935 interview, Long explained "A lot of guys would have been politically murdered for what I've been able to do quietly for the niggers. But do you think I could get away with niggers voting? No siree!" On one occasion, Long also declined to support federal anti-lynching legislation: "Can't do the dead nigra no good." However, he would also state that stopping lynching was the government’s “duty”.

Nevertheless, many of Long's efforts did benefit the black community. Long's programs, instituted when he was governor and senator, allowed a number of black Louisianans to receive an education, file for tax exemptions, and also vote without having to worry about poll taxes. A number of black ministers organized Share Our Wealth club chapters. When black leaders in New Orleans protested that the staff at one of his recently constructed hospitals was entirely white, Long quickly made several positions open to black nurses. In a 1935 interview with black activist Roy Wilkins, Long touted his new egalitarian school system: "My educational system is for blacks and whites." Trying to strike a balance among differing interpretations of Long's racial views, Wilkins later wrote, "My guess is that Huey ... wouldn't hesitate to throw Negroes to the wolves if it became necessary; neither would he hesitate to carry them along if the good they did him was greater than the harm." Burton Wheeler, one of the few men Long was close with in the Senate, wrote in his memoirs that "Long had far less racial prejudice in him than any other Southerner in the Senate." After Long's death, the official journal of the NAACP, The Crisis, wrote "Of the late Senator Huey P. Long, Negro Americans may say that he was the only Southern politician in recent decades to achieve the national spotlight without the use of racial and color hatred as campaign material... But when this is said, his story, so far as Negroes are concerned, is done."
