= Norman K. Brown =

American census worker

- Born: 1936 (age 89–90)
- Citizenship: United States
- Education: University of Rochester
- Occupation: Census enumerator
- Known for: Long tenure with the U.S. Census Bureau

Norman K. Brown (born c. 1936) is an American census enumerator who has worked on seven consecutive United States Censuses. Brown began working for the United States Census Bureau as a temporary employee in 1960 at age 24, returning every ten years thereafter for a few weeks to months through to the 24th United States Census of 2020, by which time he was 84 years of age.

Originally from New York, Brown graduated in chemistry from the University of Rochester and, in 1960, relocated to San Francisco prior to the 1960 United States census. Seeking part-time work, he applied for a position as an Enumerator with the United States Census Bureau and was assigned to canvass San Francisco's Nob Hill neighborhood for a six-week period of employment. Following his stint with the Census Bureau, Brown was hired as a grant writer within the office of the Mayor of San Francisco, but returned to work on the U.S. census every ten years thereafter. Between 1960 and 2020 he held a variety of temporary positions with the Census Bureau including as a partnership assistant, crew leader, field manager and office supervisor. During the 24th United States Census in 2020, then aged 84 years, he served as a supply and recruiting clerk. In addition to his work on the every-ten-year census, Brown also assisted with the 1995 field test done in preparation for the 22nd United States Census in 2000. According to Brown, he has been known by the moniker "Mr. Census".

Between the periods of his work on the decennial census, Brown was variously employed as a photographer with the San Francisco Sun-Reporter, as a stringer for United Press International, as an apartment manager, a film projectionist, a cabinet maker, and a sales clerk at Sears. From 1964 to 1982, excepting leaves of absences he took to work on the 19th United States Census in 1970 and the 20th United States Census in 1980, he managed a youth jobs program for the City of San Francisco.

Brown is married and has ten children.
