= 1970 United States census =

19th United States national census

Nineteenth census of the United States
- April 1, 1970
- U.S. Census Bureau seal

- 1970 U.S. census logo

General information
- Country: United States

Results
- Total population: 203,392,031 (▲13.4%)
- Most populous state: California; 19,953,134
- Least populous state: Alaska; 302,173

The 1970 United States census, conducted by the Census Bureau, determined the resident population of the United States to be 203,392,031, an increase of 13.4 percent over the 179,323,175 persons enumerated during the 1960 census.

This was the first census since 1820 in which New York was not the most populous state—California overtook it in population in November 1962. This was also the first census in which all states recorded a population of over 300,000, and the first in which a city in the geographic South—Houston—recorded a population of over 1 million.

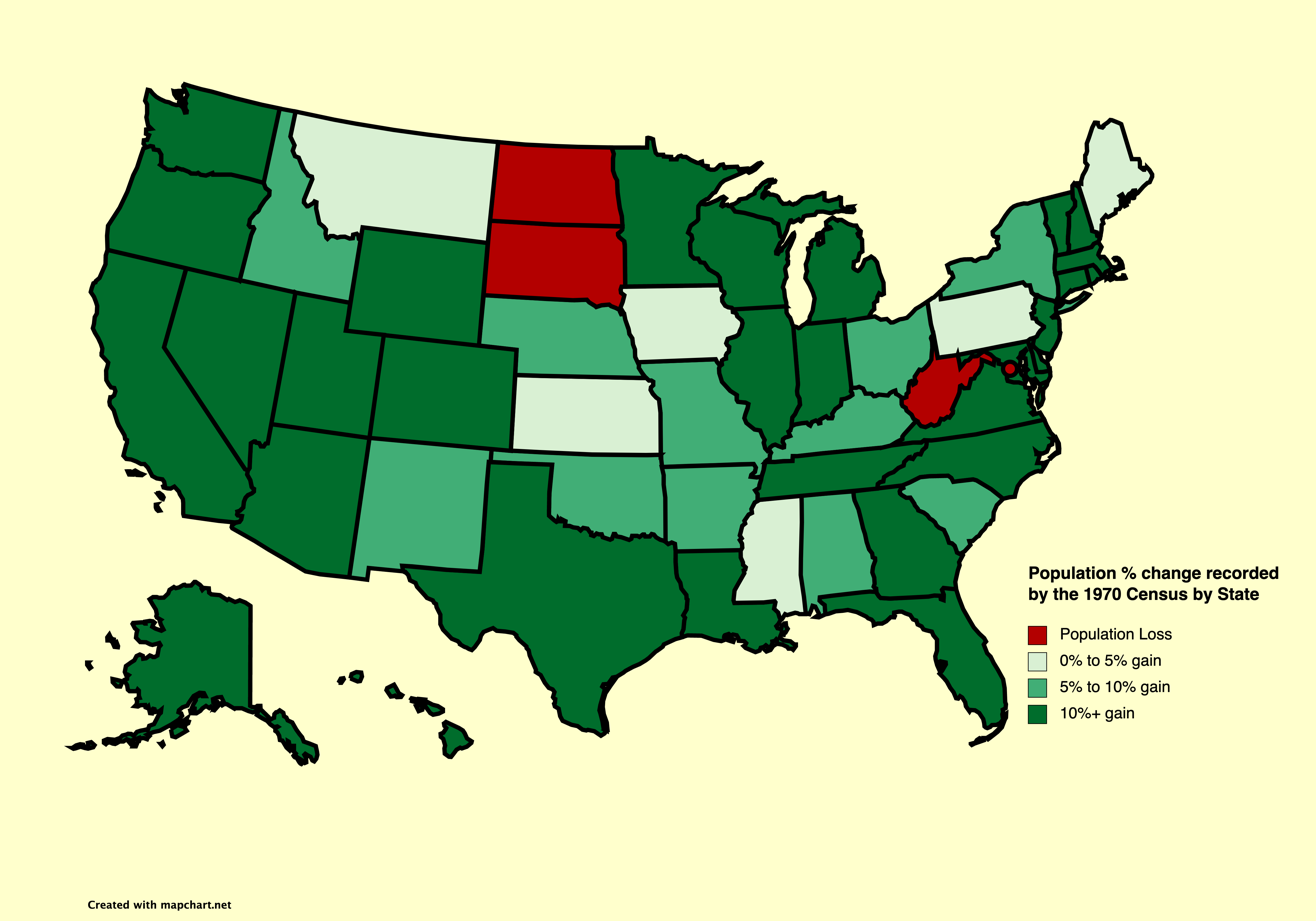
Percentage population change by state since the previous census (1960)

Accurate racial census data was required by both the Civil Rights Act of 1964 and the Voting Rights Act of 1965, and the 1970 Census changed to identify race on the basis of self-identification rather than by government census enumerators. Virtually all of the key items from the 1960 census were retained.

== Data availability ==
Microdata from the 1970 census are freely available through the Integrated Public Use Microdata Series. Aggregate data for small areas, together with electronic boundary files, can be downloaded from the National Historical Geographic Information System. These data were originally created and disseminated by DUALabs. Personally identifiable information will be available in 2042.

== State rankings ==
Rank	State	Population as of 1970 census	Population as of 1960 census	Change	Percent change
1	California	19,953,134	15,717,204	4,235,930 ▲	27.0% ▲
2	New York	18,236,967	16,782,304	1,454,663 ▲	8.7% ▲
3	Pennsylvania	11,793,909	11,319,366	474,543 ▲	4.2% ▲
4	Texas	11,196,730	9,579,677	1,617,053 ▲	16.9% ▲
5	Illinois	11,113,976	10,081,158	1,032,818 ▲	10.2% ▲
6	Ohio	10,652,017	9,706,397	945,620 ▲	9.7% ▲
7	Michigan	8,875,083	7,823,194	1,051,889 ▲	13.4% ▲
8	New Jersey	7,168,164	6,066,782	1,101,382 ▲	18.2% ▲
9	Florida	6,789,443	4,951,560	1,837,883 ▲	37.1% ▲
10	Massachusetts	5,689,170	5,148,578	540,592 ▲	10.5% ▲
11	Indiana	5,193,669	4,662,498	531,171 ▲	11.4% ▲
12	North Carolina	5,082,059	4,556,155	525,904 ▲	11.5% ▲
13	Missouri	4,676,501	4,319,813	356,688 ▲	8.3% ▲
14	Virginia	4,648,494	3,966,949	681,545 ▲	17.2% ▲
15	Georgia	4,589,575	3,943,116	646,459 ▲	16.4% ▲
16	Wisconsin	4,417,731	3,951,777	465,954 ▲	11.8% ▲
17	Tennessee	3,923,687	3,567,089	356,598 ▲	10.0% ▲
18	Maryland	3,922,399	3,100,689	821,710 ▲	26.5% ▲
19	Minnesota	3,804,971	3,413,864	391,107 ▲	11.5% ▲
20	Louisiana	3,641,306	3,257,022	384,284 ▲	11.8% ▲
21	Alabama	3,444,165	3,266,740	177,425 ▲	5.4% ▲
22	Washington	3,409,169	2,853,214	555,955 ▲	19.5% ▲
23	Kentucky	3,218,706	3,038,156	180,550 ▲	5.9% ▲
24	Connecticut	3,031,709	2,535,234	496,475 ▲	19.6% ▲
25	Iowa	2,824,376	2,757,537	66,839 ▲	2.4% ▲
26	South Carolina	2,590,516	2,382,594	207,922 ▲	8.7% ▲
27	Oklahoma	2,559,229	2,328,284	230,945 ▲	9.9% ▲
28	Kansas	2,246,578	2,178,611	67,967 ▲	3.1% ▲
29	Mississippi	2,216,912	2,178,141	38,771 ▲	1.8% ▲
30	Colorado	2,207,259	1,753,947	453,312 ▲	25.8% ▲
31	Oregon	2,091,533	1,768,687	322,846 ▲	18.3% ▲
32	Arkansas	1,923,295	1,786,272	137,023 ▲	7.7% ▲
33	Arizona	1,745,944	1,302,161	443,783 ▲	34.1% ▲
34	West Virginia	1,744,237	1,860,421	-116,184 ▼	-6.2% ▼
35	Nebraska	1,483,493	1,411,330	72,163 ▲	5.1% ▲
36	Utah	1,059,273	890,627	168,646 ▲	18.9% ▲
37	New Mexico	1,017,055	951,023	66,032 ▲	6.9% ▲
38	Maine	992,048	969,265	22,783 ▲	2.4% ▲
39	Rhode Island	946,725	859,488	87,237 ▲	10.1% ▲
40	Hawaii	769,913	632,772	137,141 ▲	21.7% ▲
–	District of Columbia	756,510	763,956	-7,446 ▼	-1.0% ▼
41	New Hampshire	737,681	606,921	130,760 ▲	21.5% ▲
42	Idaho	712,567	667,191	45,376 ▲	6.8% ▲
43	Montana	694,409	674,767	19,642 ▲	2.9% ▲
44	South Dakota	665,507	680,514	-15,007 ▼	-2.2% ▼
45	North Dakota	617,761	632,446	-14,685 ▼	-2.3% ▼
46	Delaware	548,104	446,292	101,812 ▲	22.8% ▲
47	Nevada	488,738	285,278	203,460 ▲	71.3% ▲
48	Vermont	444,330	389,881	54,449 ▲	14.0% ▲
49	Wyoming	332,416	330,066	2,350 ▲	0.7% ▲
50	Alaska	300,382	226,167	74,215 ▲	32.8% ▲

== City rankings ==
Rank	City	State	Population	Region (2014)
01	New York	New York	7,894,862	Northeast
02	Chicago	Illinois	3,366,957	Midwest
03	Los Angeles	California	2,816,061	West
04	Philadelphia	Pennsylvania	1,948,609	Northeast
05	Detroit	Michigan	1,511,482	Midwest
06	Houston	Texas	1,232,802	South
07	Baltimore	Maryland	905,759	South
08	Dallas	Texas	844,401	South
09	Washington	District of Columbia	756,510	South
10	Cleveland	Ohio	750,903	Midwest
11	Indianapolis	Indiana	744,624	Midwest
12	Milwaukee	Wisconsin	717,099	Midwest
13	San Francisco	California	715,674	West
14	San Diego	California	696,769	West
15	San Antonio	Texas	654,153	South
16	Boston	Massachusetts	641,071	Northeast
17	Memphis	Tennessee	623,988	South
18	St. Louis	Missouri	622,236	Midwest
19	New Orleans	Louisiana	593,471	South
20	Phoenix	Arizona	581,562	West
21	Columbus	Ohio	539,677	Midwest
22	Seattle	Washington	530,831	West
23	Jacksonville	Florida	528,865	South
24	Pittsburgh	Pennsylvania	520,117	Northeast
25	Denver	Colorado	514,678	West
26	Kansas City	Missouri	507,087	Midwest
27	Atlanta	Georgia	496,973	South
28	Buffalo	New York	462,768	Northeast
29	Cincinnati	Ohio	452,524	Midwest
30	Nashville-Davidson	Tennessee	448,003	South
31	San Jose	California	445,779	West
32	Minneapolis	Minnesota	434,400	Midwest
33	Fort Worth	Texas	393,476	South
34	Toledo	Ohio	383,818	Midwest
35	Portland	Oregon	382,619	West
36	Newark	New Jersey	382,417	Northeast
37	Oklahoma City	Oklahoma	366,481	South
38	Oakland	California	361,561	West
39	Louisville	Kentucky	361,472	South
40	Long Beach	California	358,633	West
41	Omaha	Nebraska	347,328	Midwest
42	Miami	Florida	334,859	South
43	Tulsa	Oklahoma	331,638	South
44	Honolulu	Hawaii	324,871	West
45	El Paso	Texas	322,261	South
46	Saint Paul	Minnesota	309,980	Midwest
47	Norfolk	Virginia	307,951	South
48	Birmingham	Alabama	300,910	South
49	Rochester	New York	296,233	Northeast
50	Tampa	Florida	277,767	South
51	Wichita	Kansas	276,554	Midwest
52	Akron	Ohio	275,425	Midwest
53	Tucson	Arizona	262,933	West
54	Jersey City	New Jersey	260,545	Northeast
55	Sacramento	California	254,413	West
56	Austin	Texas	251,808	South
57	Richmond	Virginia	249,621	South
58	Albuquerque	New Mexico	243,751	West
59	Dayton	Ohio	243,601	Midwest
60	Charlotte	North Carolina	241,178	South
61	St. Petersburg	Florida	216,232	South
62	Corpus Christi	Texas	204,525	South
63	Yonkers	New York	204,297	Northeast
64	Des Moines	Iowa	200,587	Midwest
65	Grand Rapids	Michigan	197,649	Midwest
66	Syracuse	New York	197,208	Northeast
67	Flint	Michigan	193,317	Midwest
68	Mobile	Alabama	190,026	South
69	Shreveport	Louisiana	182,064	South
70	Warren	Michigan	179,260	Midwest
71	Providence	Rhode Island	179,213	Northeast
72	Fort Wayne	Indiana	177,671	Midwest
73	Worcester	Massachusetts	176,572	Northeast
74	Salt Lake City	Utah	175,885	West
75	Gary	Indiana	175,415	Midwest
76	Knoxville	Tennessee	174,587	South
77	Arlington	Virginia	174,284	South
78	Madison	Wisconsin	173,258	Midwest
79	Virginia Beach	Virginia	172,106	South
80	Spokane	Washington	170,516	West
81	Kansas City	Kansas	168,213	Midwest
82	Anaheim	California	166,701	West
83	Fresno	California	165,972	West
84	Baton Rouge	Louisiana	165,963	South
85	Springfield	Massachusetts	163,905	Northeast
86	Hartford	Connecticut	158,017	Northeast
87	Santa Ana	California	156,601	West
88	Bridgeport	Connecticut	156,542	Northeast
89	Tacoma	Washington	154,581	West
90	Columbus	Georgia	154,168	South
91	Jackson	Mississippi	153,968	South
92	Lincoln	Nebraska	149,518	Midwest
93	Lubbock	Texas	149,101	South
94	Rockford	Illinois	147,370	Midwest
95	Paterson	New Jersey	144,824	Northeast
96	Greensboro	North Carolina	144,076	South
97	Riverside	California	140,089	West
98	Youngstown	Ohio	139,788	Midwest
99	Fort Lauderdale	Florida	139,590	South
100	Evansville	Indiana	138,764	Midwest

== Locations of 50 most populous cities ==
Location of 50 largest cities by population in the United States in 1970

== Conclusions ==
California took over as the most populous state; New York had previously been ranked number one. While the entire country increased to more than 204 million persons, four states lost population, with West Virginia leading the list, down roughly 7 percent from 1960.

On April 25, 1973, the Census Bureau announced the results of a reanalysis of the 1970 census. The report estimated that the census undercounted approximately 5.33 million people, for a net undercount rate of 2.5%. This would have made the population approximately 208.7 million. Of those undercounted, an estimated 3.45 million were white, and 1.88 million were black.
