= State censuses in the United States =

Throughout U.S. history, various U.S. states conducted their own censuses. These censuses were often conducted every ten years, in years ending with a five to complement the U.S. federal census (which is carried out in years that end with zero). Also, some of these censuses were conducted in U.S. states while they were still U.S. territories (before they became U.S. states).

No state has conducted a state census since the last Massachusetts state census was conducted in 1985.

⊗ marks the point when statehood was attained.

State	Dates and details of censuses
Alabama	1818,⊗ 1820, 1821, 1823, 1850, 1855, 1866, and 1907.
Alaska	1870, 1878, 1879, 1881, 1885, 1887, 1890–1895, 1904–1907, 1914, and 1917⊗.
Arizona	1866, 1867, 1869, 1872, 1874, 1876, 1880, and 1882⊗.
Arkansas	1823, 1829⊗, 1865, and 1911.
California	1788, 1790, 1796, 1797–1798, 1816, 1836, 1844,⊗ 1852. California's first five censuses were conducted back when it was under Spanish rule whereas its sixth and seventh censuses were conducted when California was under Mexican rule.
Colorado	1885, 1861⊗, and 1866.
Connecticut	1756, 1761, 1774, and 1782⊗
Delaware	1782⊗
District of Columbia	1803, 1867, and 1878.
Florida	1825⊗, 1855, 1866, 1867, 1868, 1875, 1885, 1895, 1905, 1935, and 1945.
Georgia	1798, 1800, 1810, 1827, 1834, 1838, 1845, 1852, 1853, 1859, 1865, and 1879.
Hawaii	The Kingdom of Hawaii conducted censuses in 1832, 1836, 1850, 1853, 1860, 1866, 1872, 1878, 1884 and 1890. The Republic of Hawaii conducted a census in 1896. The Territory of Hawaii (1898-1959) did not conduct any censuses, nor has the State of Hawaii.
Idaho	None known.
Illinois	1810⊗, 1818, 1820, 1825, 1830, 1835, 1840, 1845, 1855, and 1865.
Indiana	1807⊗, 1853, 1857, 1871, 1877, 1883, 1889, 1901, 1913, 1919, and 1931.
Iowa	1836, 1838, 1844⊗, 1846, 1847, 1849, 1851, 1852, 1854, 1856, 1885, 1895, 1905, 1915, and 1925.
Kansas	1855⊗, 1865, 1875, 1885, 1895, 1905, 1915, and 1925.
Kentucky	None known.
Louisiana	1853 and 1858.
Maine	1837.
Maryland	1712, 1755, 1776, and 1778⊗
Massachusetts	conducted censuses in 1765, 1776, 1784, 1855, 1865, 1875, 1885, 1895, 1905, 1915, 1925, 1935, 1945, 1955, 1965, 1975, and 1985. The structure of Massachusetts state censuses was similar to those of U.S. federal censuses.
Michigan	1837, 1845, 1854, 1864, 1874, 1884, 1888, 1894, and 1904.
Minnesota	1849, 1853, 1855, 1857⊗, 1865, 1875, 1885, 1895, 1905.
Mississippi	1801, 1805, 1808, 1810, 1816,⊗ 1818, 1820, 1822, 1823, 1824, 1825, 1830, 1833, 1837, 1840, 1841, 1845, 1850, 1853, 1860, and 1866.
Missouri	1797, 1803, 1817, 1819⊗, 1840, 1844, 1852, 1856, 1860, 1864, 1876, and 1880. Missouri's first census was conducted back when it was under Spanish rule.
Montana	None known.
Nebraska	1854, 1855, 1856, 1865⊗, 1869, and 1885.
Nevada	1862, 1863⊗, and 1875.
New Hampshire	1767, 1773, 1775, and 1786⊗
New Jersey	1726, 1737, 1745,⊗ 1855, 1865, 1875, 1885, 1895, 1905, and 1915.
New Mexico	1790, 1823, 1845, and 1885⊗. Its first three censuses were conducted when New Mexico was still under Spanish rule.
New York	1698, 1703, 1712, 1723, 1731, 1737, 1746, 1749, 1756, 1771, 1786⊗, 1790, 1825, 1835, 1845, 1855, 1865, 1875, 1892, 1905, 1915, and 1925. Only the name of the head of household is listed in New York state censuses from 1825 to 1845. Beginning in 1855, the name of every person in the household is listed. The 1855 to 1875 New York state censuses asked the person for the name of the county that one was born in if one was born in New York State. Also, the 1865 New York state census asked many questions about military service. New York did not conduct a census in 1885 because its Governor David B. Hill refused to support the proposed census due to its extravagance and cost. Governor Hill objected to the idea of spending so much state money on a state census that was as extravagant as the 1880 United States census. The 1892 New York state census is more vague, asking only for a country of birth (rather than a specific U.S. state or New York county of birth), not indicating relationships of various people to each other, and not indicating where new families begin on the census forms. Indeed, the 1892 New York state census contained only seven questions — name, sex, age, color (race), country of birth, citizenship status, and occupation. Meanwhile, the censuses from 1905 to 1925 asked for relationships of people to each other but also only asked for a country of birth. Also, the 1925 New York state census asked for the date and place of naturalization for naturalized U.S. citizens.
North Carolina	1786⊗
North Dakota	1885, 1915, and 1925.
Ohio	None known.
Oklahoma	1890⊗ and 1907.
Oregon	1842, 1843, 1845, 1849, 1850, 1853, 1854, 1855, 1856, 1857, 1858⊗, 1859, 1865, 1870, 1875, 1885, 1895, and 1905.
Pennsylvania	None known.
Rhode Island	1708, 1730, 1748, 1755, 1774, 1776 or 1777, 1782⊗, 1865, 1875, 1885, 1905, 1915, 1925, and 1935.
South Carolina	1825, 1839, 1869, and 1875.
South Dakota	1885⊗, 1895, 1905, 1915, 1925, 1935, and 1945.
Tennessee	1891.
Texas	Texas conducted a census between 1829 and 1836, back when it was still under Mexican rule.
Utah	1856⊗
Vermont	None known.
Virginia	1620, 1624/5, 1635, 1782, 1783, 1784, 1785, and 1786.⊗
Washington	1856, 1857, 1858, 1860, 1871, 1874, 1877, 1878, 1879, 1880, 1881, 1883, 1885, 1887⊗, 1889, 1891, 1892, and 1898.
West Virginia	None known.
Wisconsin	1836, 1838, 1842, 1846, 1847⊗, 1855, 1865, 1875, 1885, 1895, and 1905.
Wyoming	1875 and 1878⊗
