= DUALabs =

DUALabs (National Data Use and Access Laboratories) was the name of an American company that created and disseminated microdata and aggregate data files for the 1960 and 1970 censuses.

== Overview ==
The DUALabs 1960 census microdata file was noteworthy because it was designed to compatible with data from the 1970 census, allowing easy analysis of economic and demographic change between 1960 and 1970. The compatible DUALabs microdata inspired the Integrated Public Use Microdata Series which provides compatible census microdata for the period since 1850.

DUALabs used a proprietary compression algorithm to compress the 1960 and 1970 census data under NSF grant 7249358 to the Center for Research Libraries. DUALabs also received funding for the project from the Ford Foundation and NICHD (Contract 72-2707). This algorithm made wide dissemination of massive census files feasible for the first time. After DUALabs declared bankruptcy in the early 1980s, however, some data became inaccessible because the decompression software was not generally available to researchers. All DUALabs census data are now recovered, however, and are available through the National Historical Geographic Information System and the Integrated Public Use Microdata Series.

The company was headed by former Census Bureau employee Jack Beresford (1931–1996), who had worked on the compilation of the 1960 census, and the company headquarters was in Rosslyn, Virginia.

Other persons associated with this project were Gary Hill who was an employee of DUALabs and subsequently an employee of Donnelly Marketing (Stamford, CT) and CACA in Rosslyn, VA. Also, private sector organizations were members of DUALabs and Spindletop Research, Inc., Lexingon, Kentucky was a member. William (Bill) Davenall, retired, Esri of Redlands, California as their Global Manager of Health and Human Services) and was a professional researcher employed at Spindletop Research (a 501(c)3 associated with the University of Kentucky and the Commonwealth of Kentucky at the inception of DualLabs. (4)2012

== Footnotes ==
(4) William F Davenhall, Esri, Redlands, California, 2012
